= List of Oxfordian theory supporters =

This is a list of supporters of the Oxfordian theory of Shakespeare authorship, which was first promulgated in 1920.

- Percy Allen — journalist, theatre historian
- Mark Anderson — journalist, researcher, author, astrophysicist
- Charles Wisner Barrell — researcher, author
- Charles Beauclerk, Earl of Burford — writer
- Charles Sidney Beauclerk — Jesuit priest
- Michael Delahoyde — professor of English, Washington State University
- Louis P. Bénézet — American school reformer
- Harry Blackmun — U.S. Supreme Court Justice
- Marjorie Bowen — British historian, biographer, novelist
- Gelett Burgess — author, critic, poet, artist
- John Byrne — British-born Canadian-American comic book artist and writer
- Michael Chiklis — actor
- Montagu William Douglas — soldier and colonial administrator.
- Ren Draya — professor of English & communications, Blackburn College
- Roland Emmerich — film director, screenwriter, producer; producer and director of Anonymous (2011)
- William Farina — biographer, nonfiction researcher and author, essayist
- Bert Fields — lawyer and writer
- Sigmund Freud — pioneer of psychoanalysis
- Michael H. Hart — astrophysicist, author of The 100: A Ranking of the Most Influential Persons in History
- Warren Hope — academic, university English professor, author
- Christmas Humphreys — British barrister, judge, author, Buddhist scholar
- Jeremy Irons — actor
- Sir Derek Jacobi — Shakespearean actor, director
- Richard Kennedy — American children's book writer
- Felicia Hardison Londré — curators’ professor of theatre at the University of Missouri-Kansas City
- Lynne Kositsky — Canadian author of poetry and young adult historical fiction
- J. Thomas Looney — British school teacher, researcher, author
- David McCullough — historian, author, biographer
- Paul Nitze — longtime high-ranking U.S. government official and Presidential advisor, ambassador
- Charlton Greenwood Ogburn — lawyer
- Charlton Ogburn — investigative journalist, researcher, author
- John Orloff — screenwriter
- Sir Roger Penrose — mathematician, Nobel Laureate in Physics
- Anne Pluto — professor of literature and theatre, Lesley University
- Enoch Powell - politician
- Keanu Reeves - actor
- Gerald Henry Rendall — professor of Greek
- Anne Rice — author
- Mark Rylance — Shakespearean actor and director, director of Shakespeare's Globe Theatre 1995–2005
- Don Rubin — professor emeritus of theatre at York University in Toronto; Shakespeare Oxford Fellowship vice president
- Antonin Scalia — U.S. Supreme Court Justice
- Joseph Sobran — journalist, author, researcher
- John Paul Stevens — U.S. Supreme Court Justice
- Roger Stritmatter — professor of humanities at Coppin State University and the general editor of Brief Chronicles
- Peter A. Sturrock — British astrophysicist, Stanford University professor of applied physics, Arctowski Medalist, author of AKA Shakespeare: A Scientific Approach to the Authorship Question
- Patrick Walker (40 Watt Sun) — musician, songwriter.
- Bernard Mordaunt Ward — military officer, author
- Alexander Waugh — writer
- Douglas Wilson - CREC pastor, theologian, social critic
- Daniel L. Wright — Professor of English, Concordia University, Portland; Director of the Shakespeare Authorship Research Centre
- Michael York — actor
