= Oxfordian theory of Shakespeare authorship =

Alternative Shakespeare authorship theory

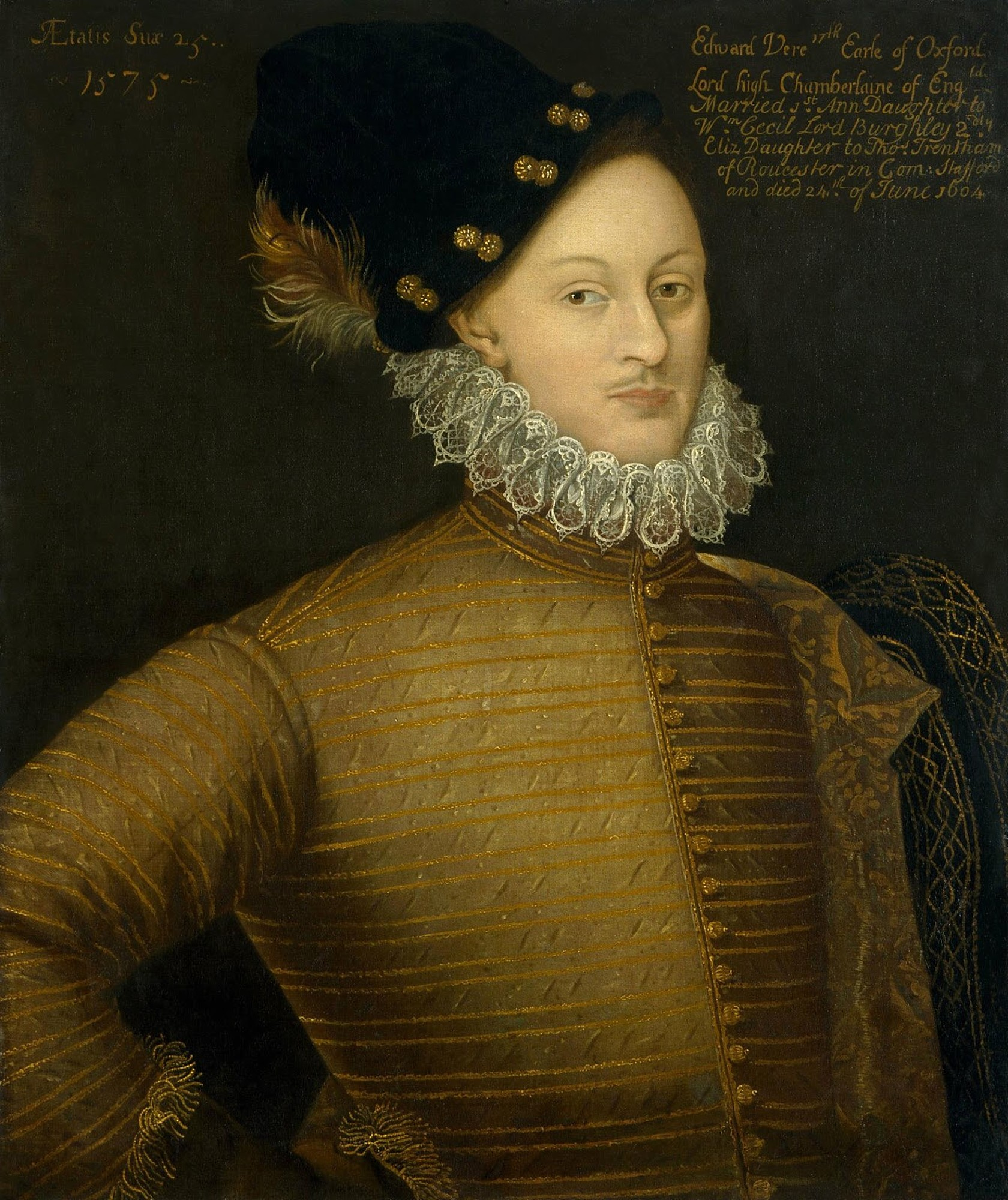
Edward de Vere, the 17th Earl of Oxford, is the most popular alternative candidate for the author behind the alleged pseudonym, Shakespeare. Unknown artist after lost original, 1575; National Portrait Gallery, London.

The Oxfordian theory of Shakespeare authorship contends that Edward de Vere, 17th Earl of Oxford, wrote the plays and poems of William Shakespeare. While historians and literary scholars overwhelmingly reject alternative authorship candidates, including Oxford, public interest in the Oxfordian theory continues. After the 1920s, the Oxfordian theory became the most popular alternative Shakespeare authorship theory.

The convergence of documentary evidence of the type used by academics for authorial attribution – title pages, testimony by other contemporary poets and historians, and official records – sufficiently establishes Shakespeare's authorship for the overwhelming majority of Shakespeare scholars and literary historians, and no such documentary evidence links Oxford to Shakespeare's works. Oxfordians, however, reject the historical record and claim that circumstantial evidence supports Oxford’s authorship, proposing that the contradictory historical evidence is part of a conspiracy that falsified the record to protect the identity of the real author. Scholarly literary specialists consider the Oxfordian method of interpreting the plays and poems as grounded in an autobiographical fallacy, and argue that using his works to infer and construct a hypothetical author's biography is both unreliable and logically unsound.

Oxfordian arguments rely heavily on biographical allusions; adherents find correspondences between incidents and circumstances in Oxford's life and events in Shakespeare's plays, sonnets, and longer poems. The case also relies on perceived parallels of language, idiom, and thought between Shakespeare's works and Oxford's own poetry and letters. Oxfordians claim that marked passages in Oxford's Bible can be linked to Biblical allusions in Shakespeare's plays. That no plays survive under Oxford's name is also important to the Oxfordian theory. Oxfordians interpret certain 16th- and 17th-century literary allusions as indicating that Oxford was one of the more prominent suppressed anonymous and/or pseudonymous writers of the day. Under this scenario, Shakespeare was either a "front man" or "play-broker" who published the plays under his own name or was merely an actor with a similar name, misidentified as the playwright since the first Shakespeare biographies of the early 1700s.

The most compelling evidence against the Oxfordian theory is de Vere's death in 1604, since the generally accepted chronology of Shakespeare's plays places the composition of approximately twelve of the plays after that date. Oxfordians respond that the annual publication of "new" or "corrected" Shakespeare plays stopped in 1604, and that the dedication to Shakespeare's Sonnets implies that the author was dead prior to their publication in 1609. Oxfordians believe the reason so many of the "late plays" show evidence of revision and collaboration is because they were completed by other playwrights after Oxford's death.

== History of the Oxfordian theory ==
The theory that the works of Shakespeare were in fact written by someone other than William Shakespeare dates back to the mid-nineteenth century. In 1857, the first book on the topic, The Philosophy of the Plays of Shakspere Unfolded, by Delia Bacon, was published. Bacon proposed the first "group theory" of Shakespearian authorship, attributing the works to a committee headed by Francis Bacon and including Walter Raleigh. De Vere is mentioned once in the book, in a list of "high-born wits and poets", who were associated with Raleigh. Some commentators have interpreted this to imply that he was part of the group of authors. Throughout the 19th century Bacon was the preferred hidden author. Oxford is not known to have been mentioned again in this context.

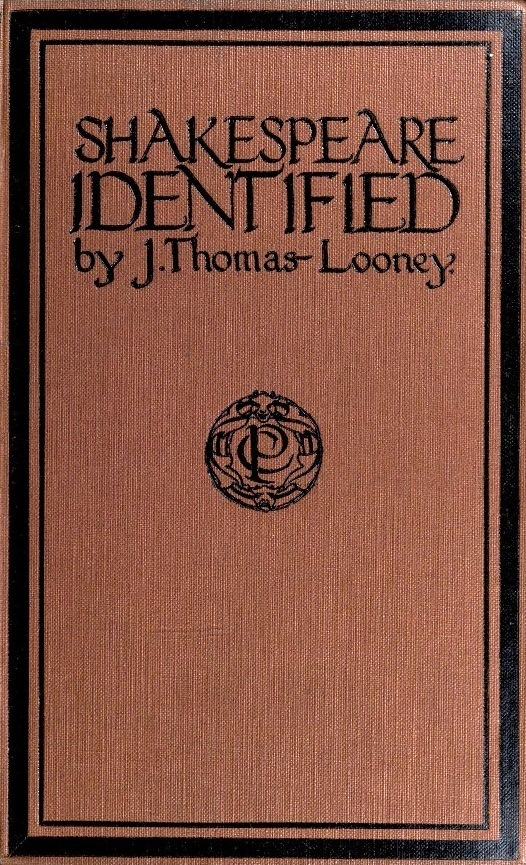
Looney's Shakespeare Identified (1920) began the modern Oxfordian movement and made Oxford the most popular anti-Stratfordian candidate.

By the beginning of the twentieth century other candidates, typically aristocrats, were put forward, most notably Roger Manners, 5th Earl of Rutland, and William Stanley, 6th Earl of Derby. Oxford's candidacy as sole author was first proposed by J. Thomas Looney in his 1920 book Shakespeare Identified in Edward de Vere, 17th Earl of Oxford. Following earlier anti-Stratfordians, Looney argued that the known facts of Shakespeare's life did not fit the personality he ascribed to the author of the plays. Like other anti-Stratfordians before him, Looney referred to the absence of records concerning Shakespeare's education, his limited experience of the world, his allegedly poor handwriting skills (evidenced in his signatures), and the "dirt and ignorance" of Stratford at the time. Shakespeare had a petty "acquisitive disposition", he said, while the plays made heroes of free-spending figures. They also portrayed middle and lower-class people negatively, while Shakespearian heroes were typically aristocratic. Looney referred to scholars who found in the plays evidence that their author was an expert in law, widely read in ancient Latin literature, and could speak French and Italian. Looney believed that even very early works such as Love's Labour's Lost implied that he was already a person of "matured powers", in his forties or fifties, with wide experience of the world. Looney considered that Oxford's personality fitted the one he deduced from the plays, and he also identified characters in the plays as detailed portraits of Oxford's family and personal contacts. Several characters, including Hamlet and Bertram (in All's Well that Ends Well), were, he believed, self-portraits. Adapting arguments earlier used for Rutland and Derby, Looney fitted events in the plays to episodes in Oxford's life, including his travels to France and Italy, the settings for many plays. Oxford's death in 1604 was linked to a drop-off in the publication of Shakespeare plays. Looney declared that the late play The Tempest was not written by Oxford, and that others performed or published after Oxford's death were most probably left incomplete and finished by other writers, thus explaining the apparent idiosyncrasies of style found in the late Shakespeare plays. Looney also introduced the argument that the reference to the "ever-living poet" in the 1609 dedication to Shakespeare's sonnets implied that the author was dead at the time of publication.

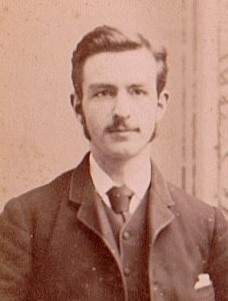
J. Thomas Looney, founder of the Oxfordian theory, as a young man

Sigmund Freud, the novelist Marjorie Bowen, and several 20th-century celebrities found the thesis persuasive, and Oxford soon overtook Bacon as the favoured alternative candidate to Shakespeare, though academic Shakespearians mostly ignored the subject. Looney's theory attracted a number of activist followers who published books supplementing his own and added new arguments, most notably Percy Allen, Bernard M. Ward, Louis P. Bénézet and Charles Wisner Barrell. Mainstream scholar Steven W. May has noted that Oxfordians of this period made genuine contributions to knowledge of Elizabethan history, citing "Ward's quite competent biography of the Earl" and "Charles Wisner Barrell's identification of Edward Vere, Oxford's illegitimate son by Anne Vavasour" as examples. In 1921, Sir George Greenwood, Looney, and others founded The Shakespeare Fellowship, an organization originally dedicated to the discussion and promotion of ecumenical anti-Stratfordian views, but which later became devoted to promoting Oxford as the true Shakespeare.

=== Decline and revival ===
After a period of decline of the Oxfordian theory beginning with World War II, in 1952 Dorothy and Charlton Greenwood Ogburn published the 1,300-page This Star of England, which briefly revived Oxfordism. A series of critical academic books and articles, however, held in check any appreciable growth of anti-Stratfordism and Oxfordism, most notably The Shakespeare Ciphers Examined (1957), by William and Elizebeth Friedman, The Poacher from Stratford (1958), by Frank Wadsworth, Shakespeare and His Betters (1958), by Reginald Churchill, The Shakespeare Claimants (1962), by H. N. Gibson, and Shakespeare and his Rivals: A Casebook on the Authorship Controversy (1962), by George L. McMichael and Edgar M. Glenn. By 1968 the newsletter of The Shakespeare Oxford Society reported that "the missionary or evangelical spirit of most of our members seems to be at a low ebb, dormant, or non-existent". In 1974, membership in the society stood at 80. In 1979, the publication of an analysis of the Ashbourne portrait dealt a further blow to the movement. The painting, long claimed to be one of the portraits of Shakespeare, but considered by Barrell to be an overpaint of a portrait of the Earl of Oxford, turned out to represent neither, but rather depicted Hugh Hamersley.

Charlton Ogburn Jr., was elected president of The Shakespeare Oxford Society in 1976 and kick-started the modern revival of the Oxfordian movement by seeking publicity through moot court trials, media debates, television and later the Internet, including Wikipedia, methods which became standard for Oxfordian and anti-Stratfordian promoters because of their success in recruiting members of the lay public. He portrayed academic scholars as self-interested members of an "entrenched authority" that aimed to "outlaw and silence dissent in a supposedly free society", and proposed to counter their influence by portraying Oxford as a candidate on equal footing with Shakespeare.

In 1985 Ogburn published his 900-page The Mysterious William Shakespeare: the Myth and the Reality, with a Foreword by Pulitzer prize-winning historian David McCullough who wrote: "[T]his brilliant, powerful book is a major event for everyone who cares about Shakespeare. The scholarship is surpassing—brave, original, full of surprise... The strange, difficult, contradictory man who emerges as the real Shakespeare, Edward de Vere, 17th Earl of Oxford, is not just plausible but fascinating and wholly believable."

By framing the issue as one of fairness in the atmosphere of conspiracy that permeated America after Watergate, he used the media to circumnavigate academia and appeal directly to the public. Ogburn's efforts secured Oxford the place as the most popular alternative candidate.

Although Shakespearian experts disparaged Ogburn's methodology and his conclusions, one reviewer, Richmond Crinkley, the Folger Shakespeare Library's former director of educational programs, acknowledged the appeal of Ogburn's approach, writing that the doubts over Shakespeare, "arising early and growing rapidly", have a "simple, direct plausibility", and the dismissive attitude of established scholars only worked to encourage such doubts. Though Crinkley rejected Ogburn's thesis, calling it "less satisfactory than the unsatisfactory orthodoxy it challenges", he believed that one merit of the book lay in how it forces orthodox scholars to reexamine their concept of Shakespeare as author. Spurred by Ogburn's book, "[i]n the last decade of the twentieth century members of the Oxfordian camp gathered strength and made a fresh assault on the Shakespearean citadel, hoping finally to unseat the man from Stratford and install de Vere in his place."

The Oxfordian theory returned to public attention in anticipation of the late October 2011 release of Roland Emmerich's drama film Anonymous. Its distributor, Sony Pictures, advertised that the film "presents a compelling portrait of Edward de Vere as the true author of Shakespeare's plays", and commissioned high school and college-level lesson plans to promote the authorship question to history and literature teachers across the United States. According to Sony Pictures, "the objective for our Anonymous program, as stated in the classroom literature, is 'to encourage critical thinking by challenging students to examine the theories about the authorship of Shakespeare's works and to formulate their own opinions.' The study guide does not state that Edward de Vere is the writer of Shakespeare's work, but it does pose the authorship question which has been debated by scholars for decades".

== Variant Oxfordian theories ==
Although most Oxfordians agree on the main arguments for Oxford, the theory has spawned schismatic variants that have not met with wide acceptance by all Oxfordians, although they have gained much attention.

=== Prince Tudor theory ===
In a letter written by Looney in 1933, he mentions that Allen and Ward were "advancing certain views respecting Oxford and Queen Eliz. which appear to me extravagant & improbable, in no way strengthen Oxford’s Shakespeare claims, and are likely to bring the whole cause into ridicule." Allen and Ward believed that they had discovered that Elizabeth and Oxford were lovers and had conceived a child. Allen developed the theory in his 1934 book Anne Cecil, Elizabeth & Oxford. He argued that the child was given the name William Hughes, who became an actor under the stage-name "William Shakespeare". He adopted the name because his father, Oxford, was already using it as a pen-name for his plays. Oxford had borrowed the name from a third Shakespeare, the man of that name from Stratford-upon-Avon, who was a law student at the time, but who was never an actor or a writer. Allen later changed his mind about Hughes and decided that the concealed child was the Earl of Southampton, the dedicatee of Shakespeare's narrative poems. This secret history, which has become known as the Prince Tudor theory, was covertly represented in Oxford's plays and poems and remained hidden until Allen and Ward's discoveries. The narrative poems and sonnets had been written by Oxford for his son. This Star of England (1952) by Charlton and Dorothy Ogburn included arguments in support of this version of the theory. Their son, Charlton Ogburn Jr, agreed with Looney that the theory was an impediment to the Oxfordian movement and omitted all discussion about it in his own Oxfordian works.

However, the theory was revived and expanded by Elisabeth Sears in Shakespeare and the Tudor Rose (2002), and Hank Whittemore in The Monument (2005), an analysis of Shakespeare's Sonnets which interprets the poems as a poetic history of Queen Elizabeth, Oxford, and Southampton. Paul Streitz's Oxford: Son of Queen Elizabeth I (2001) advances a variation on the theory: that Oxford himself was the illegitimate son of Queen Elizabeth by her stepfather, Thomas Seymour. Oxford was thus the half-brother of his own son by the queen. Streitz also believes that the queen had children by the Earl of Leicester. These were Robert Cecil, 1st Earl of Salisbury, Robert Devereux, 2nd Earl of Essex, Mary Sidney and Elizabeth Leighton.

=== Attribution of other works to Oxford ===
As with other candidates for authorship of Shakespeare's works, Oxford's advocates have attributed numerous non-Shakespearian works to him. Looney began the process in his 1921 edition of de Vere's poetry. He suggested that de Vere was also responsible for some of the literary works credited to Arthur Golding, Anthony Munday and John Lyly. Streitz credits Oxford with the Authorized King James Version of the Bible. Two professors of linguistics have claimed that de Vere wrote not only the works of Shakespeare, but most of what is memorable in English literature during his lifetime, with such names as Edmund Spenser, Christopher Marlowe, Philip Sidney, John Lyly, George Peele, George Gascoigne, Raphael Holinshed, Robert Greene, Thomas Phaer, and Arthur Golding being among dozens of further pseudonyms of de Vere. Ramon Jiménez has credited Oxford with such plays as The True Tragedy of Richard III and Edmund Ironside.

=== Group theories ===
Group theories in which Oxford played the principal role as writer, but collaborated with others to create the Shakespeare canon, were adopted by a number of early Oxfordians. Looney himself was willing to concede that Oxford may have been assisted by his son-in-law William Stanley, 6th Earl of Derby, who perhaps wrote The Tempest. B. M. Ward also suggested that Oxford and Derby worked together. In his later writings Percy Allen argued that Oxford led a group of writers, among whom was William Shakespeare. Group theories with Oxford as the principal author or creative "master mind" were also proposed by Gilbert Standen in Shakespeare Authorship (1930), Gilbert Slater in Seven Shakespeares (1931) and Montagu William Douglas in Lord Oxford and the Shakespeare Group (1952).

== Case against Oxfordian theory ==
=== Methodology of Oxfordian argument ===
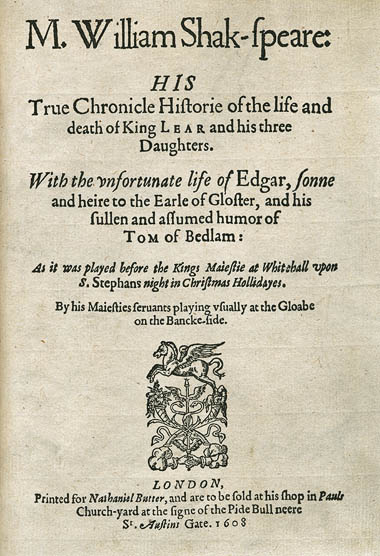
Title page of the first quarto King Lear, one of 12 plays scholars say were written after Oxford's death in 1604. Oxfordians say that no direct evidence exists that any of the plays were composed after 1604.

Specialists in Elizabethan literary history object to the methodology of Oxfordian arguments. In lieu of any evidence of the type commonly used for authorship attribution, Oxfordians discard the methods used by historians and employ other types of arguments to make their case, the most common being supposed parallels between Oxford's life and Shakespeare's works.

Another is finding cryptic allusions to Oxford's supposed play writing in other literary works of the era that to them suggest that his authorship was obvious to those "in the know". David Kathman writes that their methods are subjective and devoid of any evidential value, because they use a "double standard". Their arguments are "not taken seriously by Shakespeare scholars because they consistently distort and misrepresent the historical record", "neglect to provide necessary context" and are in some cases "outright fabrication[s]". One major evidential objection to the Oxfordian theory is Edward de Vere's 1604 death, after which a number of Shakespeare's plays are generally believed to have been written. In The Shakespeare Claimants, a 1962 examination of the authorship question, H. N. Gibson concluded that "... on analysis the Oxfordian case appears to me a very weak one".

=== Mainstream objections ===
Mainstream academics have often argued that the Oxford theory is based on snobbery: that anti-Stratfordians reject the idea that the son of a mere tradesman could write the plays and poems of Shakespeare. The Shakespeare Oxford Society has responded that this claim is "a substitute for reasoned responses to Oxfordian evidence and logic" and is merely an ad hominem attack.

Mainstream critics further say that, if William Shakespeare were a fraud instead of the true author, the number of people involved in suppressing this information would have made it highly unlikely to succeed. And citing the "testimony of contemporary writers, court records and much else" supporting Shakespeare's authorship, Columbia University professor James S. Shapiro says any theory claiming that "there must have been a conspiracy to suppress the truth of de Vere's authorship" based on the idea that "the very absence of surviving evidence proves the case" is a logically fatal tautology.

== Circumstantial evidence ==
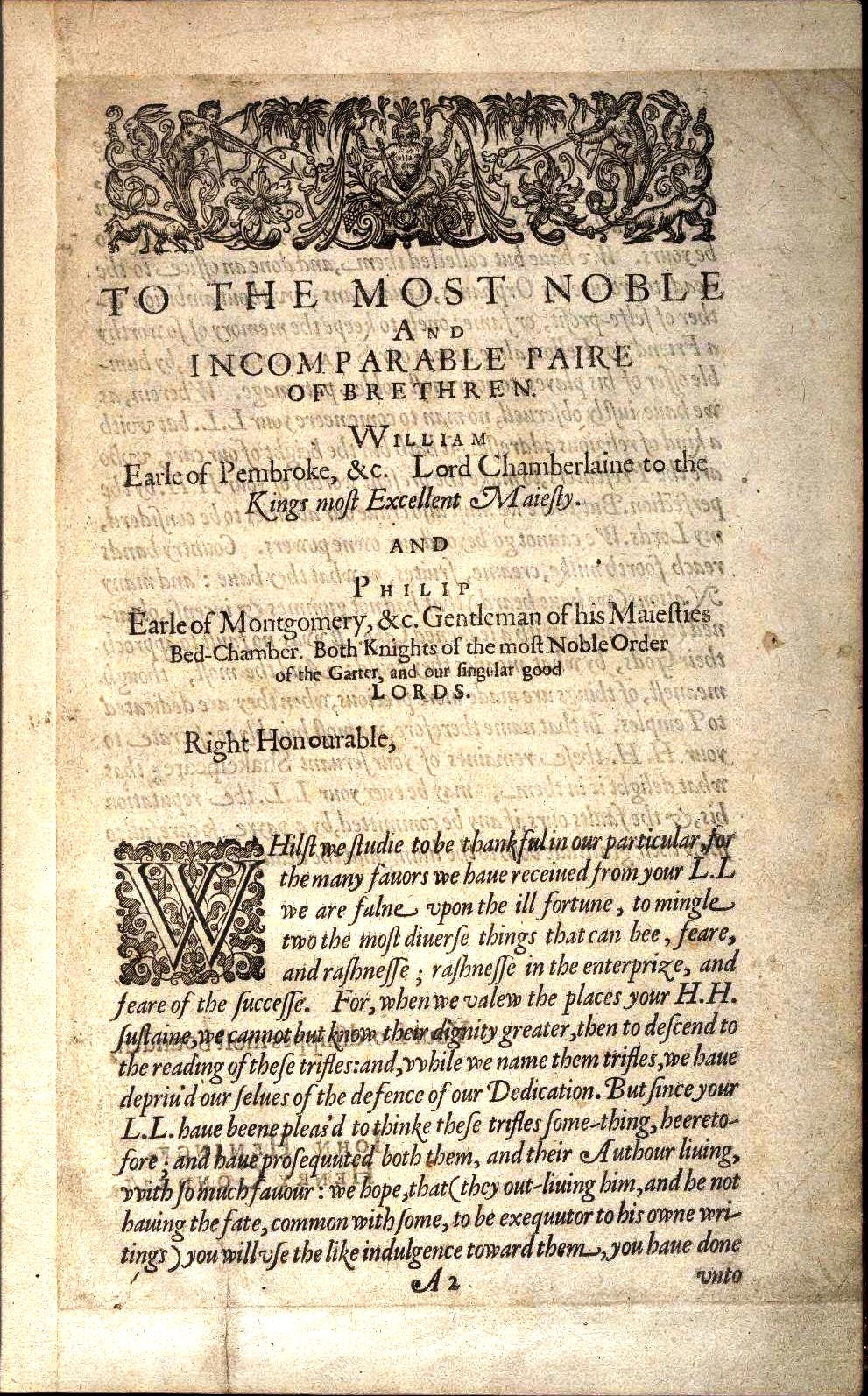
Shakespeare's First Folio was dedicated to Philip Herbert, 4th Earl of Pembroke and his brother William Herbert. Philip Herbert was married to Oxford's daughter, Susan de Vere.

While no documentary evidence connects Oxford (or any alternative author) to the plays of Shakespeare, Oxfordian writers, including Mark Anderson and Charlton Ogburn, say that connection is made by considerable circumstantial evidence inferred from Oxford's connections to the Elizabethan theatre and poetry scene; the participation of his family in the printing and publication of the First Folio; his relationship with the Earl of Southampton (believed by most Shakespeare scholars to have been Shakespeare's patron); as well as a number of specific incidents and circumstances of Oxford's life that Oxfordians say are depicted in the plays themselves.

=== Theatre connections ===
Oxford was noted for his literary and theatrical patronage, garnering dedications from a wide range of authors. For much of his adult life, Oxford patronised both adult and boy acting companies, as well as performances by musicians, acrobats and performing animals, and in 1583, he was a leaseholder of the first Blackfriars Theatre in London.

=== Family connections ===
Oxford was related to several literary figures. His mother, Margory Golding, was the sister of the Ovid translator Arthur Golding, and his uncle, Henry Howard, Earl of Surrey, was the inventor of the English or Shakespearian sonnet form.

The three dedicatees of Shakespeare's works (the earls of Southampton, Montgomery and Pembroke) were each proposed as husbands for the three daughters of Edward de Vere. Venus and Adonis and The Rape of Lucrece were dedicated to Southampton (whom many scholars have argued was the Fair Youth of the Sonnets), and the First Folio of Shakespeare's plays was dedicated to Montgomery (who married Susan de Vere) and Pembroke (who was once engaged to Bridget de Vere).

=== Oxford's Bible ===
In the late 1990s, Roger A. Stritmatter conducted a study of the marked passages found in Edward de Vere's Geneva Bible, which is now owned by the Folger Shakespeare Library. The Bible contains 1,028 instances of underlined words or passages and a few hand-written annotations, most of which consist of a single word or fragment. Stritmatter believes about a quarter of the marked passages appear in Shakespeare's works as either a theme, allusion, or quotation. Stritmatter grouped the marked passages into eight themes. Arguing that the themes fitted de Vere's known interests, he proceeded to link specific themes to passages in Shakespeare. Critics have doubted that any of the underlinings or annotations in the Bible can be reliably attributed to de Vere and not the book's other owners prior to its acquisition by the Folger Shakespeare Library in 1925, as well as challenging the looseness of Stritmatter's standards for a Biblical allusion in Shakespeare's works and arguing that there is no statistical significance to the overlap.

=== Stratford connections ===
Shakespeare's native Avon and Stratford are referred to in two prefatory poems in the 1623 First Folio, one of which refers to Shakespeare as "Swan of Avon" and another to the author's "Stratford monument". Oxfordians say the first of these phrases could refer to one of Edward de Vere's manors, Bilton Hall, near the Forest of Arden, in Rugby, on the River Avon. This view was first expressed by Charles Wisner Barrell, who argued that De Vere "kept the place as a literary hideaway where he could carry on his creative work without the interference of his father-in-law, Burghley, and other distractions of Court and city life." Oxfordians also consider it significant that the nearest town to the parish of Hackney, where de Vere later lived and was buried, was also named Stratford. Mainstream scholar Irvin Matus demonstrated that Oxford sold the Bilton house in 1580, having previously rented it out, making it unlikely that Ben Jonson's 1623 poem would identify Oxford by referring to a property he once owned, but never lived in, and sold 43 years earlier. Nor is there any evidence of a monument to Oxford in Stratford, London, or anywhere else; his widow provided for the creation of one at Hackney in her 1613 will, but there is no evidence that it was ever erected.

=== Oxford's annuity ===
Oxfordians also believe that Rev. Dr. John Ward's 1662 diary entry stating that Shakespeare wrote two plays a year "and for that had an allowance so large that he spent at the rate of £1,000 a year" as a critical piece of evidence, since Queen Elizabeth I gave Oxford an annuity of exactly £1,000 beginning in 1586 that was continued until his death. Ogburn wrote that the annuity was granted "under mysterious circumstances", and Anderson suggests it was granted because of Oxford's writing patriotic plays for government propaganda. However, the documentary evidence indicates that the allowance was meant to relieve Oxford's embarrassed financial situation caused by the ruination of his estate.

=== Oxford's travels and the settings of Shakespeare's plays ===
Almost half of Shakespeare's plays are set in Italy, many of them containing details of Italian laws, customs, and culture which Oxfordians believe could only have been obtained by personal experiences in Italy, and especially in Venice. The author of The Merchant of Venice, Looney believed, "knew Italy first hand and was touched with the life and spirit of the country". This argument had earlier been used by supporters of the Earl of Rutland and the Earl of Derby as authorship candidates, both of whom had also travelled on the continent of Europe. Oxfordian William Farina refers to Shakespeare's apparent knowledge of the Jewish ghetto, Venetian architecture and laws in The Merchant of Venice, especially the city's "notorious Alien Statute". Historical documents confirm that Oxford lived in Venice, and travelled for over a year through Italy. He disliked the country, writing in a letter to Lord Burghley dated 24 September 1575, "I am glad I have seen it, and I care not ever to see it any more". Still, he remained in Italy for another six months, leaving Venice in March 1576. According to Anderson, Oxford definitely visited Venice, Padua, Milan, Genoa, Palermo, Florence, Siena and Naples, and probably passed through Messina, Mantua and Verona, all cities used as settings by Shakespeare. In testimony before the Venetian Inquisition, Edward de Vere was said to be fluent in Italian.

However, some Shakespeare scholars say that Shakespeare gets many details of Italian life wrong, including the laws and urban geography of Venice. Kenneth Gross writes that "the play itself knows nothing about the Venetian ghetto; we get no sense of a legally separate region of Venice where Shylock must dwell." Scott McCrea describes the setting as "a nonrealistic Venice" and the laws invoked by Portia as part of the "imaginary world of the play", inconsistent with actual legal practice. Charles Ross points out that Shakespeare's Alien Statute bears little resemblance to any Italian law. For later plays such as Othello, Shakespeare probably used Lewes Lewknor's 1599 English translation of Gasparo Contarini's The Commonwealth and Government of Venice for some details about Venice's laws and customs.

Shakespeare derived much of this material from John Florio, an Italian scholar living in England who was later thanked by Ben Jonson for helping him get Italian details right for his play Volpone. Keir Elam has traced Shakespeare's Italian idioms in Shrew and some of the dialogue to Florio's Second Fruits, a bilingual introduction to Italian language and culture published in 1591. Jason Lawrence believes that Shakespeare’s Italian dialogue in the play derives "almost entirely" from Florio’s First Fruits (1578). He also believes that Shakespeare became more proficient in reading the language as set out in Florio’s manuals, as evidenced by his increasing use of Florio and other Italian sources for writing the plays.

=== Oxford's education and knowledge of court life ===
In 1567 Oxford was admitted to Gray's Inn, one of the Inns of Court which Justice Shallow reminisces about in Henry IV, Part 2. Sobran observes that the Sonnets "abound not only in legal terms – more than 200 – but also in elaborate legal conceits." These terms include: allege, auditor, defects, exchequer, forfeit, heirs, impeach, lease, moiety, recompense, render, sureties, and usage. Shakespeare also uses the legal term "quietus" (final settlement) in Sonnet 134, the last Fair Youth sonnet.

Regarding Oxford's knowledge of court life, which Oxfordians believe is reflected throughout the plays, mainstream scholars say that any special knowledge of the aristocracy appearing in the plays can be more easily explained by Shakespeare's life-time of performances before nobility and royalty, and possibly, as Gibson theorises, "by visits to his patron's house, as Marlowe visited Walsingham."

== Oxford's literary reputation ==
=== Oxford's lyric poetry ===
Some of Oxford's lyric works have survived. Steven W. May, an authority on Oxford's poetry, attributes sixteen poems definitely, and four possibly, to Oxford noting that these are probably "only a good sampling" as "both Webbe (1586) and Puttenham (1589) rank him first among the courtier poets, an eminence he probably would not have been granted, despite his reputation as a patron, by virtue of a mere handful of lyrics".

May describes Oxford as a "competent, fairly experimental poet working in the established modes of mid-century lyric verse" and his poetry as "examples of the standard varieties of mid-Elizabethan amorous lyric". In 2004, May wrote that Oxford's poetry was "one man's contribution to the rhetorical mainstream of an evolving Elizabethan poetic" and challenged readers to distinguish any of it from "the output of his mediocre mid-century contemporaries". C. S. Lewis wrote that de Vere's poetry shows "a faint talent", but is "for the most part undistinguished and verbose."

==== Comparisons to Shakespeare's work ====
In the opinion of J. Thomas Looney, as "far as forms of versification are concerned De Vere presents just that rich variety which is so noticeable in Shakespeare; and almost all the forms he employs we find reproduced in the Shakespeare work." Oxfordian Louis P. Bénézet created the "Bénézet test", a collage of lines from Shakespeare and lines he thought were representative of Oxford, challenging non-specialists to tell the difference between the two authors. May notes that Looney compared various motifs, rhetorical devices and phrases with certain Shakespeare works to find similarities he said were "the most crucial in the piecing together of the case", but that for some of those "crucial" examples Looney used six poems mistakenly attributed to Oxford that were actually written by Greene, Campion, and Greville. Bénézet also used two lines from Greene that he thought were Oxford's, while succeeding Oxfordians, including Charles Wisner Barrell, have also misattributed poems to Oxford. "This on-going confusion of Oxford's genuine verse with that of at least three other poets", writes May, "illustrates the wholesale failure of the basic Oxfordian methodology."

According to a computerised textual comparison developed by the Claremont Shakespeare Clinic, the styles of Shakespeare and Oxford were found to be "light years apart", and the odds of Oxford having written Shakespeare were reported as "lower than the odds of getting hit by lightning". Furthermore, while the First Folio shows traces of a dialect identical to Shakespeare's, the Earl of Oxford, raised in Essex, spoke an East Anglian dialect. John Shahan and Richard Whalen condemned the Claremont study, calling it "apples to oranges", and noting that the study did not compare Oxford's songs to Shakespeare's songs, did not compare a clean unconfounded sample of Oxford's poems with Shakespeare's poems, and charged that the students under Elliott and Valenza's supervision incorrectly assumed that Oxford's youthful verse was representative of his mature poetry.

Joseph Sobran's book, Alias Shakespeare, includes Oxford's known poetry in an appendix with what he considers extensive verbal parallels with the work of Shakespeare, and he argues that Oxford's poetry is comparable in quality to some of Shakespeare's early work, such as Titus Andronicus. Other Oxfordians say that de Vere's extant work is that of a young man and should be considered juvenilia, while May believes that all the evidence dates his surviving work to his early 20s and later.

=== Contemporary reception ===
Four contemporary critics praise Oxford as a poet and a playwright, three of them within his lifetime:

1. William Webbe's Discourse of English Poetrie (1586) surveys and criticises the early Elizabethan poets and their works. He parenthetically mentions those of Elizabeth's court, and names Oxford as "the most excellent" among them.
2. The Arte of English Poesie (1589), attributed to George Puttenham, includes Oxford on a list of courtier poets and prints some of his verses as exemplars of "his excellencie and wit." He also praises Oxford and Richard Edwardes as playwrights, saying that they "deserve the hyest price" for the works of "Comedy and Enterlude" that he has seen.
3. Francis Meres' 1598 Palladis Tamia mentions both Oxford and Shakespeare as among several playwrights who are "the best for comedy amongst us".
4. Henry Peacham's 1622 The Compleat Gentleman includes Oxford on a list of courtier and would-be courtier Elizabethan poets.

Mainstream scholarship characterises the extravagant praise for de Vere's poetry more as a convention of flattery than honest appreciation of literary merit. Alan Nelson, de Vere's documentary biographer, writes that "[c]ontemporary observers such as Harvey, Webbe, Puttenham and Meres clearly exaggerated Oxford's talent in deference to his rank."

=== Perceived allusions to Oxford as a concealed writer ===
Before the advent of copyright, anonymous and pseudonymous publication was a common practice in the sixteenth century publishing world, and a passage in the Arte of English Poesie (1589), an anonymously published work itself, mentions in passing that literary figures in the court who wrote "commendably well" circulated their poetry only among their friends, "as if it were a discredit for a gentleman to seem learned" (Book 1, Chapter 8). In another passage 23 chapters later, the author (probably George Puttenham) speaks of aristocratic writers who, if their writings were made public, would appear to be excellent. It is in this passage that Oxford appears on a list of poets.

According to Daniel Wright, these combined passages confirm that Oxford was one of the concealed writers in the Elizabethan court. Critics of this view argue that neither Oxford nor any other writer is here identified as a concealed writer, but as the first in a list of known modern writers whose works have already been "made public", "of which number is first" Oxford, adding to the publicly acknowledged literary tradition dating back to Geoffrey Chaucer. Other critics interpret the passage to mean that the courtly writers and their works are known within courtly circles, but not to the general public. In either case, neither Oxford nor anyone else is identified as a hidden writer or one that used a pseudonym.

Oxfordians argue that at the time of the passage's composition (pre-1589), the writers referenced were not in print, and interpret Puttenham's passage (that the noblemen preferred to 'suppress' their work to avoid the discredit of appearing learned) to mean that they were 'concealed'. They cite Sir Philip Sidney, none of whose poetry was published until after his premature death, as an example. Similarly, up to 1589 nothing by Greville was in print, and only one of Walter Raleigh's works had been published.

Critics point out that six of the nine poets listed had appeared in print under their own names long before 1589, including a number of Oxford's poems in printed miscellanies, and the first poem published under Oxford's name was printed in 1572, 17 years before Puttenham's book was published. Several other contemporary authors name Oxford as a poet, and Puttenham himself quotes one of Oxford's verses elsewhere in the book, referring to him by name as the author, so Oxfordians misread Puttenham.

Oxfordians also believe other texts refer to the Edward de Vere as a concealed writer. They argue that satirist John Marston's Scourge of Villanie (1598) contains further cryptic allusions to Oxford, named as "Mutius". Marston expert Arnold Davenport believes that Mutius is the bishop-poet Joseph Hall and that Marston is criticising Hall's satires.

There is a description of the figure of Oxford in The Revenge of Bussy D'Ambois, a 1613 play by George Chapman, who has been suggested as the Rival Poet of Shakespeare's Sonnets. Chapman describes Oxford as "Rare and most absolute" in form and says he was "of spirit passing great / Valiant and learn’d, and liberal as the sun". He adds that he "spoke and writ sweetly" of both learned subjects and matters of state ("public weal").

== Chronology of the plays and Oxford's 1604 death ==
For mainstream Shakespearian scholars, the most compelling evidence against Oxford (besides the historical evidence for William Shakespeare) is his death in 1604, since the generally accepted chronology of Shakespeare's plays places the composition of approximately twelve of the plays after that date. Critics often cite The Tempest and Macbeth, for example, as having been written after 1604.

The exact dates of the composition of most of Shakespeare's plays are uncertain, although David Bevington says it is a 'virtually unanimous' opinion among teachers and scholars of Shakespeare that the canon of late plays depicts an artistic journey that extends well beyond 1604. Evidence for this includes allusions to historical events and literary sources which postdate 1604, as well as Shakespeare's adaptation of his style to accommodate Jacobean literary tastes and the changing membership of the King's Men and their different venues.

Oxfordians say that the conventional composition dates for the plays were developed by mainstream scholars to fit within Shakespeare's lifetime and that no evidence exists that any plays were written after 1604. Anderson argues that all of the Jacobean plays were written before 1604, selectively citing non-Oxfordian scholars like Alfred Harbage, Karl Elze, and Andrew Cairncross to bolster his case. Anderson notes that from 1593 through 1603, the publication of new plays appeared at the rate of two per year, and whenever an inferior or pirated text was published, it was typically followed by a genuine text described on the title page as "newly augmented" or "corrected". After the publication of the Q1 and Q2 Hamlet in 1603, no new plays were published until 1608. Anderson observes that, "After 1604, the 'newly correct[ing]' and 'augment[ing]' stops. Once again, the Shake-speare [sic] enterprise appears to have shut down".

=== Notable silences ===
Because Shakespeare lived until 1616, Oxfordians question why, if he were the author, did he not eulogise Queen Elizabeth at her death in 1603 or Henry, Prince of Wales, at his in 1612. They believe Oxford's 1604 death provides the explanation. In an age when such actions were expected, Shakespeare also failed to memorialise the coronation of James I in 1604, the marriage of Princess Elizabeth in 1612, and the investiture of Prince Charles as the new Prince of Wales in 1613.

Anderson contends that Shakespeare refers to the latest scientific discoveries and events through the end of the 16th century, but "is mute about science after de Vere’s [Oxford’s] death in 1604". He believes that the absence of any mention of the spectacular supernova of October 1604 or Kepler’s revolutionary 1609 study of planetary orbits are especially noteworthy.

=== The move to the Blackfriars ===
Professor Jonathan Bate writes that Oxfordians cannot "provide any explanation for ... technical changes attendant on the King's Men's move to the Blackfriars theatre four years after their candidate's death .... Unlike the Globe, the Blackfriars was an indoor playhouse" and so required plays with frequent breaks in order to replace the candles it used for lighting. "The plays written after Shakespeare's company began using the Blackfriars in 1608, Cymbeline and The Winter's Tale for instance, have what most ... of the earlier plays do not have: a carefully planned five-act structure". If new Shakespearian plays were being written especially for presentation at the Blackfriars' theatre after 1608, they could not have been written by Edward de Vere.

Oxfordians argue that Oxford was well acquainted with the Blackfriars Theatre, having been a leaseholder of the venue, and note that the "assumption" that Shakespeare wrote plays for the Blackfriars is not universally accepted, citing Shakespearian scholars such as A. Nicoll who said that "all available evidence is either completely negative or else runs directly counter to such a supposition" and Harley Granville-Barker, who stated "Shakespeare did not write (except for Henry V) five-act plays at any stage of his career. The five-act structure was formalized in the First Folio, and is inauthentic".

=== Shakespeare's late collaborations ===
Further, attribution studies have shown that certain plays in the canon were written by two or three hands, which Oxfordians believe is explained by these plays being either drafted earlier than conventionally believed, or simply revised/completed by others after Oxford's death. Shapiro calls this a 'nightmare' for Oxfordians, implying a 'jumble sale scenario' for his literary remains long after his death.

=== Identification of earlier works with Shakespeare plays ===
Some Oxfordians have identified titles or descriptions of lost works from Oxford's lifetime that suggest a thematic similarity to a particular Shakespearian play and asserted that they were earlier versions. For example, in 1732, the antiquarian Francis Peck published in Desiderata Curiosa a list of documents in his possession that he intended to print someday. They included "a pleasant conceit of Vere, earl of Oxford, discontented at the rising of a mean gentleman in the English court, circa 1580." Peck never published his archives, which are now lost. To Anderson, Peck's description suggests that this conceit is "arguably an early draft of Twelfth Night."

=== Contemporary references to Shakespeare as alive or dead ===
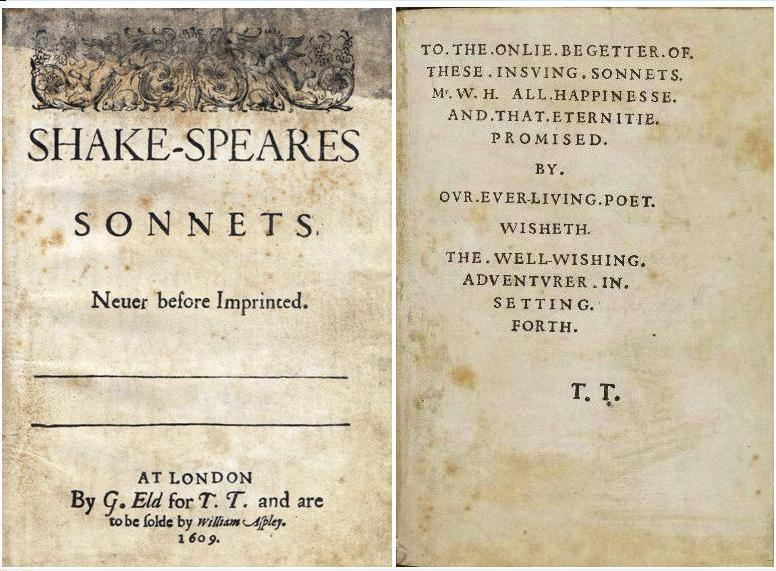
Title page and dedication of the Sonnets (1609). The hyphenated name and the phrase "ever-living poet" are used as arguments in the authorship debate.

Oxfordian writers say some literary allusions imply that the playwright and poet died prior to 1609, when Shake-Speares Sonnets appeared with the epithet "our ever-living poet" in its dedication. They claim that the phrase "ever-living" rarely, if ever, referred to a living person, but instead was used to refer to the eternal soul of the deceased. Bacon, Derby, Neville, and William Shakespeare all lived well past the 1609 publication of the Sonnets.

However, Don Foster, in his study of Early Modern uses of the phrase "ever-living", argues that the phrase most frequently refers to God or other supernatural beings, suggesting that the dedication calls upon God to bless the living begetter (writer) of the sonnets. He states that the initials "W. H." were a misprint for "W. S." or "W. SH". Bate thinks it a misprint as well, but he thinks it "improbable" that the phrase refers to God and suggests that the "ever-living poet" might be "a great dead English poet who had written on the great theme of poetic immortality", such as Sir Philip Sidney or Edmund Spenser.

Joseph Sobran, in Alias Shakespeare, argued that in 1607 William Barksted, a minor poet and playwright, implies in his poem "Mirrha the Mother of Adonis" that Shakespeare was already deceased. Shakespeare scholars explain that Sobran has simply misread Barksted’s poem, the last stanza of which is a comparison of Barksted’s poem to Shakespeare’s Venus and Adonis, and has mistaken the grammar also, which makes it clear that Barksted is referring to Shakespeare’s "song" in the past tense, not Shakespeare himself. This context is obvious when the rest of the stanza is included.

Against the Oxford theory are several references to Shakespeare, later than 1604, which imply that the author was then still alive. Scholars point to a poem written circa 1620 by a student at Oxford, William Basse, that mentioned the author Shakespeare died in 1616, which is the year Shakespeare deceased and not Edward de Vere.

=== Dates of composition ===
==== The Two Gentlemen of Verona ====
Tom Veal has noted that the early play The Two Gentlemen of Verona reveals no familiarity on the playwright's part with Italy other than "a few place names and the scarcely recondite fact that the inhabitants were Roman Catholics." For example, the play's Verona is situated on a tidal river and has a duke, and none of the characters have distinctly Italian names like in the later plays. Therefore, if the play was written by Oxford, it must have been before he visited Italy in 1575. However, the play's principal source, the Spanish Diana Enamorada, would not be translated into French or English until 1578, meaning that someone basing a play on it that early could only have read it in the original Spanish, and there is no evidence that Oxford spoke this language. Furthermore, Veal argues, the only explanation for the verbal parallels with the English translation of 1582 would be that the translator saw the play performed and echoed it in his translation, which he describes as "not an impossible theory but far from a plausible one."

==== Hamlet ====
The composition date of Hamlet has been frequently disputed. Several surviving references indicate that a Hamlet-like play was well-known throughout the 1590s, well before the traditional period of composition (1599–1601). Most scholars refer to this lost early play as the Ur-Hamlet; the earliest reference is in 1589. A 1594 performance record of Hamlet appears in Philip Henslowe's diary, and Thomas Lodge wrote of it in 1596.

Oxfordian researchers believe that the play is an early version of Shakespeare's own play, and point to the fact that Shakespeare's version survives in three quite different early texts, Q1 (1603), Q2 (1604) and F (1623), suggesting the possibility that it was revised by the author over a period of many years.

==== Macbeth ====
Scholars contend that the composition date of Macbeth is one of the most overwhelming pieces of evidence against the Oxfordian position; the vast majority of critics believe the play was written in the aftermath of the Gunpowder Plot. This plot was brought to light on 5 November 1605, a year after Oxford died. In particular, scholars identify the porter's lines about "equivocation" and treason as an allusion to the trial of Henry Garnet in 1606. Oxfordians respond that the concept of "equivocation" was the subject of a 1583 tract by Queen Elizabeth's chief councillor (and Oxford's father-in-law) Lord Burghley, as well as of the 1584 Doctrine of Equivocation by the Spanish prelate Martín de Azpilcueta, which was disseminated across Europe and into England in the 1590s.

==== Coriolanus ====
Shakespearian scholar David Haley asserts that if Edward de Vere had written Coriolanus, he "must have foreseen the Midland Revolt grain riots [of 1607] reported in Coriolanus", possible topical allusions in the play that most Shakespearians accept.

==== The Tempest ====
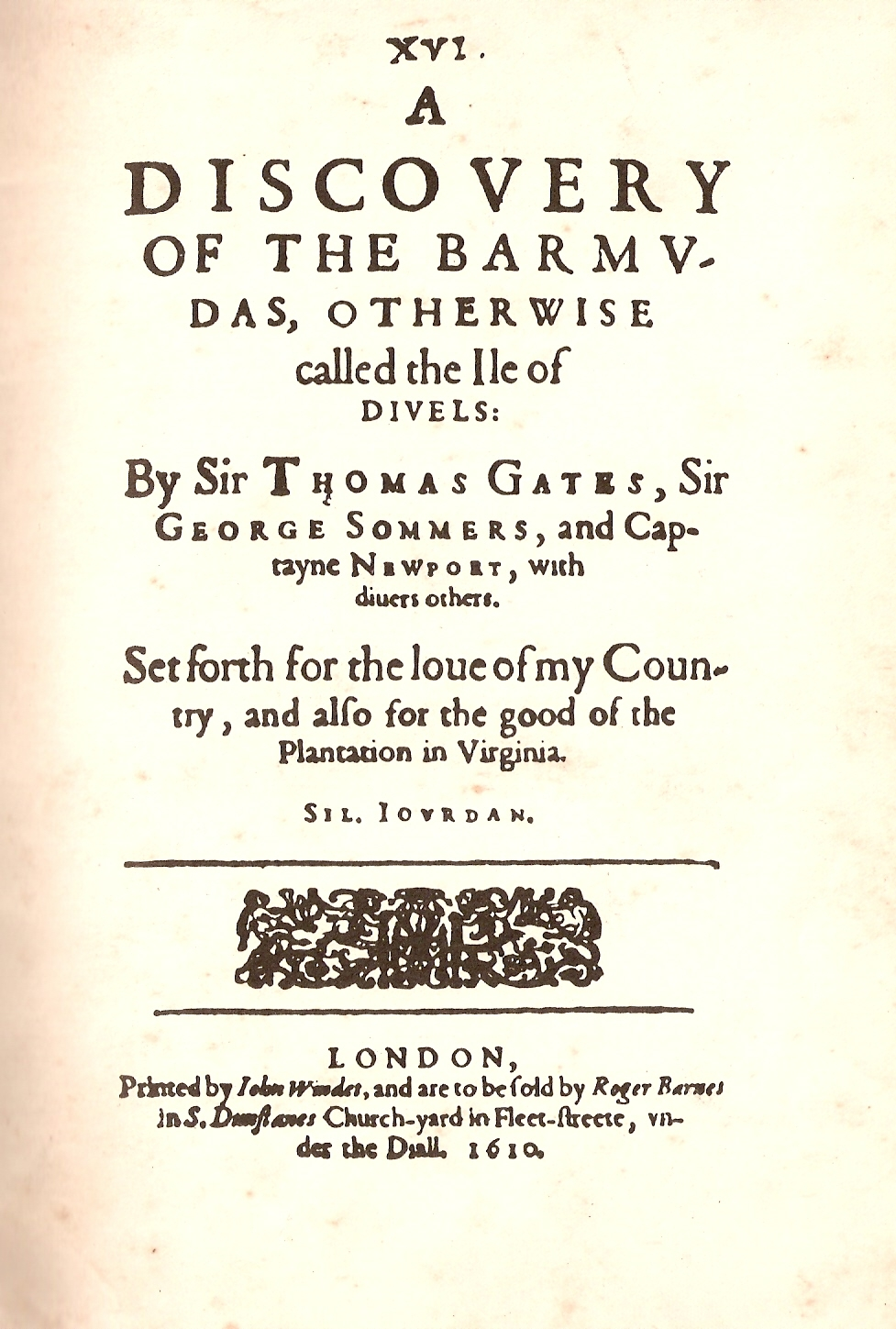
Sylvester Jordain's A Discovery of the Barmudas, 1610

The play that can be dated within a fourteen-month period is The Tempest. This play has long been believed to have been inspired by the 1609 wreck at Bermuda, then feared by mariners as the Isle of the Devils, of the flagship of the Virginia Company, the Sea Venture, while leading the Third Supply to relieve Jamestown in the Colony of Virginia. The Sea Venture was captained by Christopher Newport, and carried the Admiral of the company's fleet, Sir George Somers (for whom the archipelago would subsequently be named The Somers Isles). The survivors spent nine months in Bermuda before most completed the journey to Jamestown on 23 May 1610 aboard two new ships built from scratch. One of the survivors was the newly-appointed Governor, Sir Thomas Gates. Jamestown, then little more than a rudimentary fort, was found in such a poor condition, with the majority of the previous settlers dead or dying, that Gates and Somers decided to abandon the settlement and the continent, returning everyone to England. However, with the company believing all aboard the Sea Venture dead, a new governor, Baron De La Warr, had been sent with the Fourth Supply fleet, which arrived on 10 June 1610 as Jamestown was being abandoned.

De la Warr remained in Jamestown as Governor, while Gates returned to England (and Somers to Bermuda), arriving in September, 1610. The news of the survival of the Sea Venture's passengers and crew caused a great sensation in England. Two accounts were published: Sylvester Jordain's A Discovery of the Barmvdas, Otherwise Called the Ile of Divels, in October, 1610, and A True Declaration of the Estate of the Colonie in Virginia a month later. The True Reportory of the Wrack, and Redemption of Sir Thomas Gates Knight, an account by William Strachey dated 15 July 1610, returned to England with Gates in the form of a letter which was circulated privately until its eventual publication in 1625. Shakespeare had multiple contacts to the circle of people amongst whom the letter circulated, including to Strachey. The Tempest shows clear evidence that he had read and relied on Jordain and especially Strachey. The play shares premise, basic plot, and many details of the Sea Venture's wrecking and the adventures of the survivors, as well as specific details and linguistics. A detailed comparative analysis shows the Declaration to have been the primary source from which the play was drawn. This firmly dates the writing of the play to the months between Gates' return to England and 1 November 1611 (when the first recorded performance occurred).

Oxfordians have dealt with this problem in several ways. Looney expelled the play from the canon, arguing that its style and the "dreary negativism" it promoted were inconsistent with Shakespeare's "essentially positivist" soul, and so could not have been written by Oxford. Later Oxfordians have generally abandoned this argument; this has made severing the connection of the play with the wreck of the Sea Venture a priority amongst Oxfordians. A variety of attacks have been directed on the links. These include attempting to cast doubt on whether the Declaration travelled back to England with Gates, whether Gates travelled back to England early enough, whether the lowly Shakespeare would have had access to the lofty circles in which the Declaration was circulated, to understating the points of similarity between the Sea Venture wreck and the accounts of it, on the one hand, and the play on the other. Oxfordians have even claimed that the writers of the first-hand accounts of the real wreck based them on The Tempest, or, at least, the same antiquated sources that Shakespeare, or rather Oxford, is imagined to have used exclusively, including Richard Eden's The Decades of the New Worlde Or West India (1555) and Desiderius Erasmus's Naufragium/The Shipwreck (1523). Alden Vaughan commented in 2008 that "[t]he argument that Shakespeare could have gotten every thematic thread, every detail of the storm, and every similarity of word and phrase from other sources stretches credulity to the limits."

==== Henry VIII ====
Oxfordians note that while the conventional dating for Henry VIII is 1610–13, the majority of 18th and 19th century scholars, including notables such as Samuel Johnson, Lewis Theobald, George Steevens, Edmond Malone, and James Halliwell-Phillipps, placed the composition of Henry VIII prior to 1604, as they believed Elizabeth's execution of Mary, Queen of Scots (the then king James I's mother) made any vigorous defence of the Tudors politically inappropriate in the England of James I. Though it is described as a new play by two witnesses in 1613, Oxfordians argue that this refers to the fact it was new on stage, having its first production in that year.

== Oxfordian cryptology ==
Although searching Shakespeare's works for encrypted clues supposedly left by the true author is associated mainly with the Baconian theory, such arguments are often made by Oxfordians as well. Early Oxfordians found many references to Oxford's family name "Vere" in the plays and poems, in supposed puns on words such as "ever" (E. Vere). In The De Vere Code, a book by English actor Jonathan Bond, the author believes that Thomas Thorpe's 30-word dedication to the original publication of Shakespeare's Sonnets contains six simple encryptions which conclusively establish de Vere as the author of the poems. He also writes that the alleged encryptions settle the question of the identity of "the Fair Youth" as Henry Wriothesley and contain striking references to the sonnets themselves and de Vere's relationship to Sir Philip Sidney and Ben Jonson.

Similarly, a 2009 article in the Oxfordian journal Brief Chronicles noted that Francis Meres in Palladis Tamia compares 17 named English poets to 16 named classical poets. Writing that Meres was obsessed with numerology, the authors propose that the numbers should be symmetrical, and that careful readers are meant to infer that Meres knew two of the English poets (viz., Oxford and Shakespeare) to actually be one and the same.

== Parallels with the plays ==
Literary scholars say that the idea that an author's work must reflect his or her life is a Modernist assumption not held by Elizabethan writers, and that biographical interpretations of literature are unreliable in attributing authorship. Further, such lists of similarities between incidents in the plays and the life of an aristocrat are flawed arguments because similar lists have been drawn up for many competing candidates, such as Francis Bacon and William Stanley, 6th Earl of Derby. Harold Love writes that "The very fact that their application has produced so many rival claimants demonstrates their unreliability," and Jonathan Bate writes that the Oxfordian biographical method "is in essence no different from the cryptogram, since Shakespeare's range of characters and plots, both familial and political, is so vast that it would be possible to find in the plays 'self-portraits' of ... anybody one cares to think of."

Despite this, Oxfordians list numerous incidents in Oxford's life that they say parallel those in many of the Shakespeare plays. Most notable among these, they say, are certain similar incidents found in Oxford's biography and Hamlet, and Henry IV, Part 1, which includes a well-known robbery scene with uncanny parallels to a real-life incident involving Oxford.

=== Hamlet ===
Most Oxfordians consider Hamlet the play most easily seen as portraying Oxford's life story, though mainstream scholars say that incidents from the lives of other contemporary figures such as King James or the Earl of Essex, fit the play just as closely, if not more so.

Hamlet's father was murdered and his mother made an "o'er-hasty marriage" less than two months later. Oxfordians see a parallel with Oxford's life, as Oxford's father died at the age of 46 on 3 August 1562, although not before making a will six days earlier, and his stepmother remarried within 15 months, although exactly when is unknown.

Another frequently-cited parallel involves Hamlet's revelation in Act IV that he was earlier taken captive by pirates. On Oxford's return from Europe in 1576, he encountered a cavalry division outside of Paris that was being led by a German duke, and his ship was hijacked by pirates who robbed him and left him stripped to his shirt, and who might have murdered him had not one of them recognised him. Anderson notes that "[n]either the encounter with Fortinbras' army nor Hamlet's brush with buccaneers appears in any of the play's sources – to the puzzlement of numerous literary critics."

==== Polonius ====
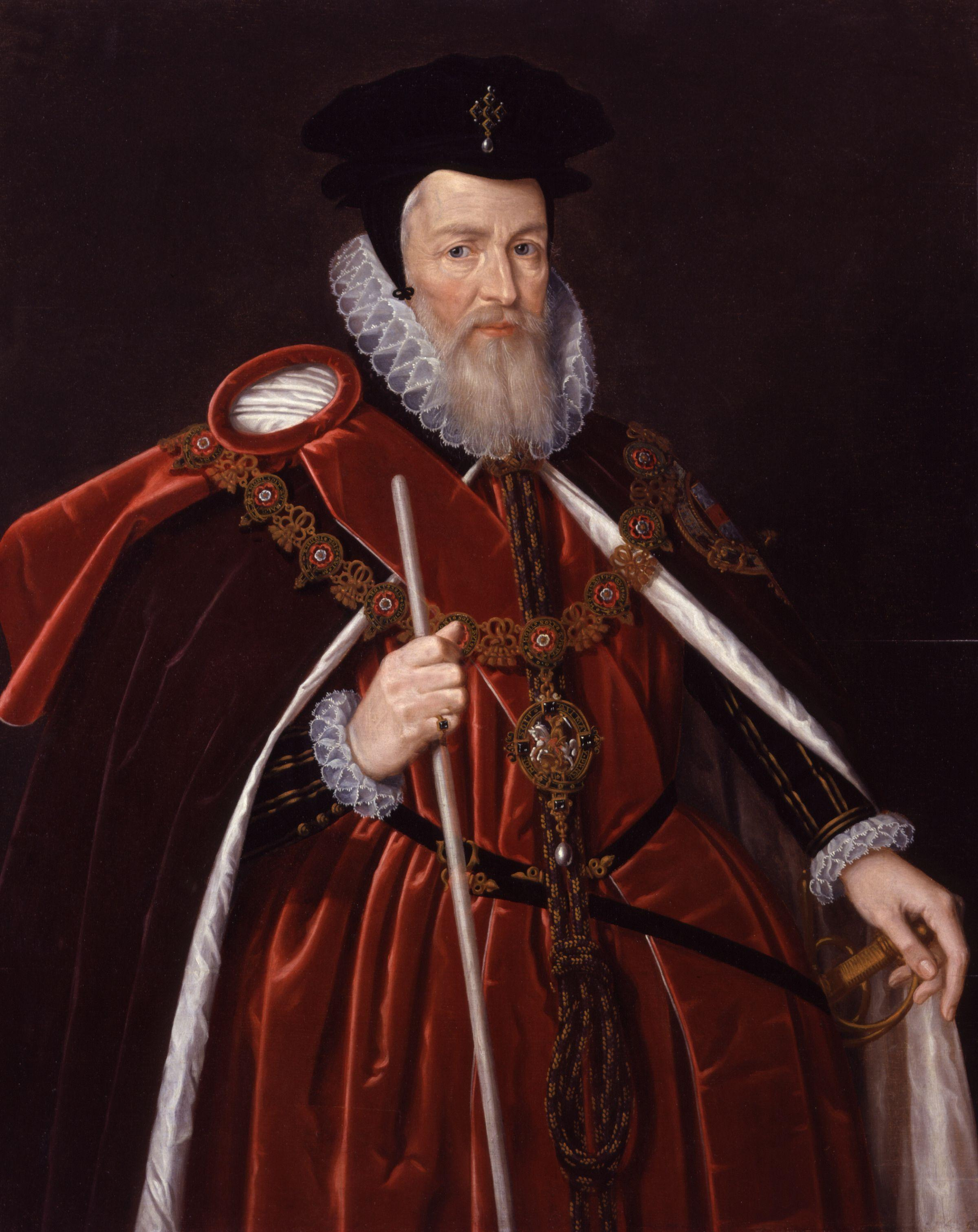
William Cecil (Lord Burghley), Oxford's guardian and father-in-law, and Queen Elizabeth's most trusted advisor. Many Oxfordians believe Polonius is based on Lord Burghley.

Such speculation often identifies the character of Polonius as a caricature of Lord Burghley, Oxford's guardian from the age of 12.

In the First Quarto the character was not named Polonius, but Corambis. Ogburn writes that Cor ambis can be interpreted as "two-hearted" (a view not independently supported by Latinists). He says the name is a swipe "at Burghley's motto, Cor unum, via una, or 'one heart, one way.'" Scholars suggest that it derives from the Latin phrase "crambe repetita" meaning "reheated cabbage", which was expanded in Elizabethan usage to "Crambe bis posita mors est" ("twice served cabbage is deadly"), which implies "a boring old man" who spouts trite rehashed ideas. Similar variants such as "Crambo" and "Corabme" appear in Latin-English dictionaries at the time.

=== Bed trick ===
In his Memoires (1658), Francis Osborne writes of "the last great Earle of Oxford, whose Lady was brought to his bed under the notion of his Mistris, and from such a virtuous deceit she (Oxford's youngest daughter) is said to proceed" (p. 79).

Such a bed trick has been a dramatic convention since antiquity and was used more than 40 times by every major playwright in the Early Modern theatre era except for Ben Jonson. Thomas Middleton used it five times and Shakespeare and James Shirley used it four times. Shakespeare's use of it in All's Well That Ends Well and Measure for Measure followed his sources for the plays (stories by Boccaccio and Cinthio); nevertheless Oxfordians say that de Vere was drawn to these stories because they "paralleled his own", based on Osborne's anecdote.

=== Earls of Oxford in the histories ===
Oxfordians claim that flattering treatment of Oxford's ancestors in Shakespeare's history plays is evidence of his authorship. Shakespeare omitted the character of the traitorous Robert de Vere, 3rd Earl of Oxford in The Life and Death of King John, and the character of the 12th Earl of Oxford is given a much more prominent role in Henry V than his limited involvement in the actual history of the times would allow. The 12th Earl is given an even more prominent role in the non-Shakespearian play The Famous Victories of Henry the fifth. Some Oxfordians argue that this was another play written by Oxford, based on the exaggerated role it gave to the 11th Earl of Oxford.

J. Thomas Looney found John de Vere, 13th Earl of Oxford is "hardly mentioned except to be praised" in Henry VI, Part Three; the play ahistorically depicts him participating in the Battle of Tewkesbury and being captured. Oxfordians, such as Dorothy and Charlton Ogburn, believe Shakespeare created such a role for the 13th Earl because it was the easiest way Edward de Vere could have "advertised his loyalty to the Tudor Queen" and remind her of "the historic part borne by the Earls of Oxford in defeating the usurpers and restoring the Lancastrians to power". Looney also notes that in Richard III, when the future Henry VII appears, the same Earl of Oxford is "by his side; and it is Oxford who, as premier nobleman, replies first to the king's address to his followers".

Non-Oxfordian writers do not see any evidence of partiality for the de Vere family in the plays. Richard de Vere, 11th Earl of Oxford, who plays a prominent role in the anonymous The Famous Victories of Henry V, does not appear in Shakespeare's Henry V, nor is he even mentioned. In Richard III, Oxford's reply to the king noted by Looney is a mere two lines, the only lines he speaks in the play. He has a much more prominent role in the non-Shakespearian play The True Tragedy of Richard III. On these grounds the scholar Benjamin Griffin argues that the non-Shakespearian plays, the Famous Victories and True Tragedy, are the ones connected to Oxford, possibly written for Oxford's Men. Oxfordian Charlton Ogburn Jr. argues that the role of the Earls of Oxford was played down in Henry V and Richard III to maintain Oxford's nominal anonymity. This is because "It would not do to have a performance of one of his plays at Court greeted with ill-suppressed knowing chuckles."

=== Oxford's finances ===
In 1577 the Company of Cathay was formed to support Martin Frobisher's hunt for the Northwest Passage, although Frobisher and his investors quickly became distracted by reports of gold at Hall’s Island. With thoughts of an impending Canadian gold-rush and trusting in the financial advice of Michael Lok, the treasurer of the company, de Vere signed a bond for £3,000 in order to invest £1,000 and to assume £2,000 worth – about half – of Lok's personal investment in the enterprise. Oxfordians say this is similar to Antonio in The Merchant of Venice, who was indebted to Shylock for 3,000 ducats against the successful return of his vessels.

Oxfordians also note that when de Vere travelled through Venice, he borrowed 500 crowns from a Baptista Nigrone. In Padua, he borrowed from a man named Pasquino Spinola. In The Taming of the Shrew, Kate's father is described as a man "rich in crowns." He, too, is from Padua, and his name is Baptista Minola, which Oxfordians take to be a conflation of Baptista Nigrone and Pasquino Spinola.

When the character of Antipholus of Ephesus in The Comedy of Errors tells his servant to go out and buy some rope, the servant (Dromio) replies, "I buy a thousand pounds a year! I buy a rope!" (Act 4, scene 1). The meaning of Dromio’s line has not been satisfactorily explained by critics, but Oxfordians say the line is somehow connected to the fact that de Vere was given a £1,000 annuity by the Queen, later continued by King James.

=== Marriage and affairs ===
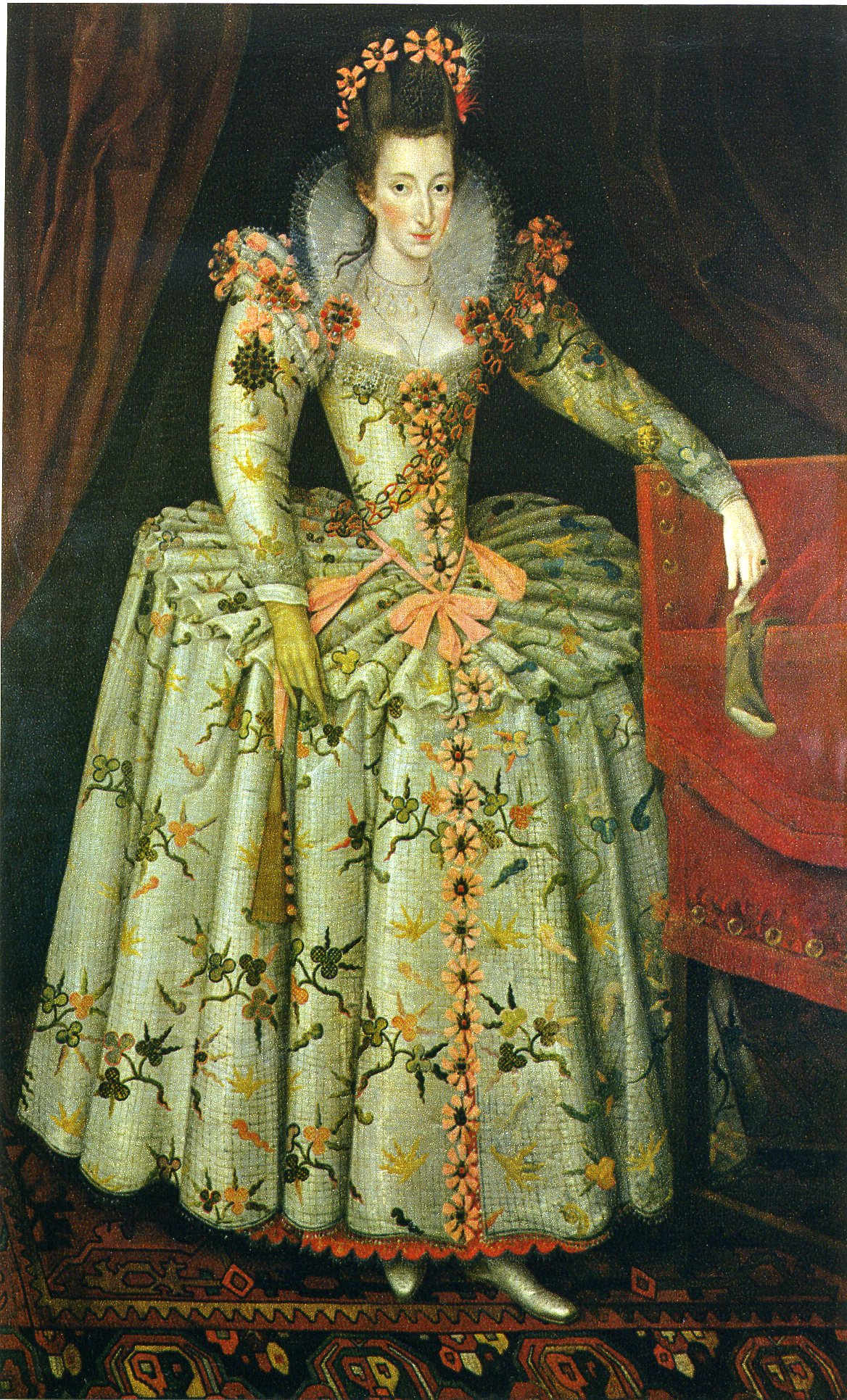
Anne Vavasour, with whom Oxford had a tempestuous extramarital affair from 1579–81.

Oxfordians see Oxford's marriage to Anne Cecil, Lord Burghley's daughter, paralleled in such plays as Hamlet, Othello, Cymbeline, The Merry Wives of Windsor, All's Well That Ends Well, Measure for Measure, Much Ado About Nothing, and The Winter's Tale.

Oxford's illicit congress with Anne Vavasour resulted in an intermittent series of street battles between the Knyvet clan, led by Anne's uncle, Sir Thomas Knyvet, and Oxford’s men. As in Romeo and Juliet, this imbroglio produced three deaths and several other injuries. The feud was finally put to an end only by the intervention of the Queen.

=== Oxford's criminal associations ===
In May 1573, in a letter to Lord Burghley, two of Oxford's former employees accused three of Oxford's friends of attacking them on "the highway from Gravesend to Rochester." In Shakespeare's Henry IV, Part 1, Falstaff and three roguish friends of Prince Hal also waylay unwary travellers at Gad's Hill, which is on the highway from Gravesend to Rochester. Scott McCrea says that there is little similarity between the two events, since the crime described in the letter is unlikely to have occurred near Gad's Hill and was not a robbery, but rather an attempted shooting. Mainstream writers also say that this episode derives from an earlier anonymous play, The Famous Victories of Henry V, which was Shakespeare's source. Some Oxfordians argue that The Famous Victories was written by Oxford, based on the exaggerated role it gave to the 11th Earl of Oxford.

== Parallels with the sonnets and poems ==
In 1609, a volume of 154 linked poems was published under the title SHAKE-SPEARES SONNETS. Oxfordians believe the title (Shake-Speares Sonnets) suggests a finality indicating that it was a completed body of work with no further sonnets expected, and consider the differences of opinion among Shakespearian scholars as to whether the Sonnets are fictional or autobiographical to be a serious problem facing orthodox scholars. Joseph Sobran questions why Shakespeare (who lived until 1616) failed to publish a corrected and authorised edition if they are fiction, as well as why they fail to match Shakespeare's life story if they are autobiographic. According to Sobran and other researchers, the themes and personal circumstances expounded by the author of the Sonnets are remarkably similar to Oxford's biography.

=== The Fair Youth, the Dark Lady, and the Rival Poet ===
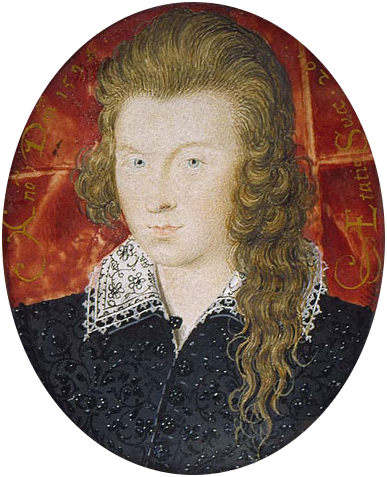
Southampton, Oxford's peer and one-time prospective son-in-law, and the often-purported "Fair Youth" of the early sonnets.

The focus of the 154 sonnet series appears to narrate the author's relationships with three characters: the Fair Youth, the Dark Lady or Mistress, and the Rival Poet. Beginning with Looney, most Oxfordians (exceptions are Percy Allen and Louis Bénézet) believe that the "Fair Youth" referred to in the early sonnets refers to Henry Wriothesley, 3rd Earl of Southampton, Oxford's peer and prospective son-in-law. The Dark Lady is believed by some Oxfordians to be Anne Vavasour, Oxford's mistress who bore him a son out of wedlock. A case was made by the Oxfordian Peter R. Moore that the Rival Poet was Robert Devereux, Earl of Essex.

Sobran suggests that the so-called procreation sonnets were part of a campaign by Burghley to persuade Southampton to marry his granddaughter, Oxford's daughter Elizabeth de Vere, and says that it was more likely that Oxford would have participated in such a campaign than that Shakespeare would know the parties involved or presume to give advice to the nobility.

Oxfordians also assert that the tone of the poems is that of a nobleman addressing an equal rather than that of a poet addressing his patron. According to them, Sonnet 91 (which compares the Fair Youth's love to such treasures as high birth, wealth, and horses) implies that the author is in a position to make such comparisons, and the 'high birth' he refers to is his own.

=== Age and lameness ===
Oxford was born in 1550, and was between 40 and 53 years old when he presumably would have written the sonnets. Shakespeare was born in 1564. Even though the average life expectancy of Elizabethans was short, being between 26 and 39 was not considered old. In spite of this, age and growing older are recurring themes in the Sonnets, for example, in Sonnets 138 and 37. In his later years, Oxford described himself as "lame". On several occasions, the author of the sonnets also described himself as lame, such as in Sonnets 37 and 89.

=== Public disgrace ===
Sobran also believes "scholars have largely ignored one of the chief themes of the Sonnets: the poet's sense of disgrace ... [T]here can be no doubt that the poet is referring to something real that he expects his friends to know about; in fact, he makes clear that a wide public knows about it ... Once again the poet's situation matches Oxford's ... He has been a topic of scandal on several occasions. And his contemporaries saw the course of his life as one of decline from great wealth, honor, and promise to disgrace and ruin. This perception was underlined by enemies who accused him of every imaginable offense and perversion, charges he was apparently unable to rebut." Examples include Sonnets 29 and 112.

As early as 1576, Edward de Vere was writing about this subject in his poem Loss of Good Name, which Steven W. May described as "a defiant lyric without precedent in English Renaissance verse."

=== Lost fame ===
The poems Venus and Adonis and Lucrece, first published in 1593 and 1594 under the name "William Shakespeare", proved highly popular for several decades – with Venus and Adonis published six more times before 1616, while Lucrece required four additional printings during this same period. By 1598, they were so famous, London poet and sonneteer Richard Barnefield wrote:

Shakespeare.....
Whose Venus and whose Lucrece (sweet and chaste)
Thy name in fame's immortal Book have plac't
Live ever you, at least in Fame live ever:
Well may the Body die, but Fame dies never.

Despite such publicity, Sobran observed, "[t]he author of the Sonnets expects and hopes to be forgotten. While he is confident that his poetry will outlast marble and monument, it will immortalize his young friend, not himself. He says that his style is so distinctive and unchanging that 'every word doth almost tell my name,' implying that his name is otherwise concealed – at a time when he is publishing long poems under the name William Shakespeare. This seems to mean that he is not writing these Sonnets under that (hidden) name." Oxfordians have interpreted the phrase "every word" as a pun on the word "every", standing for "e vere" – thus telling his name. Mainstream writers respond that several sonnets literally do tell his name, containing numerous puns on the name Will[iam]; in sonnet 136 the poet directly says "thou lov'st me for my name is Will."

Based on Sonnets 81, 72, and others, Oxfordians assert that if the author expected his "name" to be "forgotten" and "buried", it would not have been the name that permanently adorned the published works themselves.

== In fiction ==
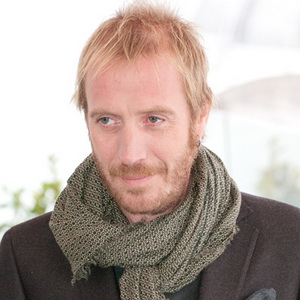
Rhys Ifans played Edward de Vere in the 2011 film Anonymous

- Leslie Howard's 1943 anti-Nazi film "Pimpernel" Smith features dialogue by the protagonist endorsing the Oxfordian theory.
- In the afterword of the 2000 young adult novel A Question of Will, author Lynne Kositsky addresses the debate over who really wrote Shakespeare's plays, supporting the Oxfordian theory.
- Oxfordian theory, and the Shakespeare authorship question in general, is the basis of Amy Freed's 2001 play The Beard of Avon.
- Oxfordian theory is central to the plot of Sarah Smith's 2003 novel Chasing Shakespeares.
- The 2005 young adult novel Shakespeare's Secret by Elise Broach is centred on the Oxfordian theory.
- The Oxfordian theory, among others, is discussed in Jennifer Lee Carrell's 2007 novel Interred With Their Bones.
- The 2011 film Anonymous, directed by Roland Emmerich, portrays the Prince Tudor theory.
- The theory is mocked in a 5 minute scene in the 2014 movie The Gambler.

== See also ==
- List of Oxfordian theory supporters
- Baconian theory
- Derbyite theory
- Marlovian theory
- Neville theory

== Citations ==
UK and US editions of Shapiro 2010 differ significantly in pagination; the citations here are to the UK edition so page numbers reflect that edition.

== Sources ==
- Anderson, Mark (2005). "Shakespeare" by Another Name: The Life of Edward de Vere, Earl of Oxford, The Man Who Was Shakespeare. Gotham Books. ISBN 1-592-40103-1.
- Anderson, Mark (2006). "Shakespeare" by Another Name: The Life of Edward de Vere, Earl of Oxford, The Man Who Was Shakespeare (expanded paperback ed.). Gotham Books.
- Barrell, Charles Wisner (1942). "'Shake-speare's' Unknown Home on the River Avon Discovered Edward De Vere's Ownership of a Famous Warwickshire Literary Retreat Indicates Him As the True 'Sweet Swan of Avon'". The Shakespeare Fellowship News-Letter. 4 (1). Shakespeare Fellowship: 1–8.
- Bate, Jonathan (1998). The Genius of Shakespeare. Oxford University Press. ISBN 978-0-19-512823-9.
- Bethell, Tom (October 1991). "The Case for Oxford (and Reply)". Atlantic Monthly. 268 (4): 45–61, 74–78. ISSN 1072-7825.
- Bevington, David Martin (2005). Shakespeare: The Seven Ages of Human Experience. Wiley-Blackwell. ISBN 978-1-4051-2753-0.
- Blakemore, Bill (14 October 2011). "'Anonymous': Was Shakespeare A Fraud?". ABC News.
- Chambers, E. K. (1923), The Elizabethan Stage, Volume 2, Oxford University Press, ISBN 978-0-19-956749-2
- Cousins, A. D. (2011), "Shakespeare's Sonnets", in Cousins, A. D. (ed.), The Cambridge Companion to the Sonnet, Cambridge: Cambridge University Press, ISBN 978-0-521-51467-5
- Crinkley, Richmond (1985). "New Perspectives on the Authorship Question". Shakespeare Quarterly. 36 (4). Folger Shakespeare Library: 515–22. doi:10.2307/2870328. JSTOR 2870328.
- Davenport, Arnold (1961). The Poems of John Marston. Liverpool University Press.
- Desens, Marliss C. (1994). The Bed-Trick in English Renaissance Drama: Explorations of Gender, Sexuality, and Power. Associated University Presses. ISBN 0-87413-476-5.
- Elam, Keir (2007). "'At the cubiculo': Shakespeare's Problems with Italian Language and Culture". In Marrapodi, Michele (ed.). Italian Culture in the Drama of Shakespeare & his Contemporaries: Rewriting, Remaking, Refashioning. Ashgate Publishing. pp. 99–110. ISBN 978-0-7546-5504-6.
- Elliott, Ward E. Y.; Valenza, Robert J. (2004). "Oxford by the Numbers: What Are the Odds That the Earl of Oxford Could Have Written Shakespeare's Poems and Plays?" (PDF). Tennessee Law Review. 72 (1). Tennessee Law Review Association: 323–452. ISSN 0040-3288. Archived from the original (PDF) on 20 October 2020.
- Elliott, Ward E. Y.; Valenza, Robert J. (2007). "My Other Car is a Shakespeare: A Response to Shahan & Whalen's 'Apples to Oranges in Bard Stylometrics'" (PDF). The Oxfordian. 10. Shakespeare Oxford Society: 142–53.
- Farina, William (2006), De Vere as Shakespeare: An Oxfordian Reading of the Canon, Jefferson, NC: McFarland & Company
- Foster, Don (1987), "Master W.H., R.I.P", PMLA, 102 (1): 42–54, doi:10.2307/462491, JSTOR 462491, S2CID 163691922.
- Fowler, William Plumer (1986), Shakespeare Revealed in Oxford's Letters, Portsmouth, New Hampshire: Peter E. Randall, ISBN 9780914339120
- Friedman, William F.; Friedman, Elizebeth S. (1957). The Shakespearean Ciphers Examined. Cambridge University Press. ISBN 978-0-521-05040-1.
- Gibson, H. N. (1962). The Shakespeare Claimants. Routledge Library Editions – Shakespeare. Routledge. ISBN 978-0-415-35290-1.
- Gibson, H. N. (2005) [1962]. The Shakespeare Claimants. Routledge Library Editions – Shakespeare. Routledge. ISBN 978-0-415-35290-1.
- Griffin, Benjamin (2001). Playing the Past: Approaches to English Historical Drama; 1385–1600. Boydell & Brewer. ISBN 0859916154.
- Hunter, G. K. (2006) [1959]. "Introduction". In Hunter, G. K. (ed.). All's Well That Ends Well. The Arden Shakespeare, Second Series. pp. xi–lix. ISBN 978-1903436233.
- Jenkins, Harold, ed. (1982). Hamlet, Prince of Denmark. The Arden Shakespeare. London, England: Methuen. ISBN 0-416-17910-X.
- Kathman, David (31 March 1999). "A Letter to Harper's Magazine". Harper's Magazine.
- Kathman, David (2003). "The Question of Authorship". In Wells, Stanley; Orlin, Lena Cowen (eds.). Shakespeare: an Oxford Guide. Oxford Guides. Oxford University Press. pp. 620–32. ISBN 978-0-19-924522-2.
- Kathman (1), David. "Alleged Parallels between the Plays and Oxford's Life". The Shakespeare Authorship Page. David Kathman and Terry Ross.
- Kathman (3), David. "Critically Examining Oxfordian Claims: Oxford's Bible". The Shakespeare Authorship Page. David Kathman and Terry Ross.
- Kathman, David; Ross, Terry. "Shakespeare and Barkstead". The Shakespeare Authorship Page. David Kathman and Terry Ross.
- Lawrence, Jason (2005). 'Who the Devil Taught Thee So Much Italian?': Italian Language Learning and Literary Imitation in Early Modern England. Manchester University Press. ISBN 0-7190-6914-9.
- Lewis, C. S. (1990) [1944]. Poetry and Prose in the Sixteenth Century. Oxford: Clarendon Press. ISBN 978-0198122319.
- Looney, J. Thomas (1920). "Shakespeare" Identified in Edward De Vere, the Seventeenth Earl of Oxford. New York: Frederick A. Stokes. Archived from the original on 31 July 2010 – via Shakespeare Fellowship.
- Looney, J. Thomas (1948). "Shakespeare" Identified in Edward De Vere, the Seventeenth Earl of Oxford. New York: Duell, Sloan and Pearce. OCLC 717181678.
- Love, Harold (2002). Attributing Authorship: An Introduction. Cambridge University Press. ISBN 978-0-521-78948-6.
- Matus, Irvin L. (1994). Shakespeare, IN FACT. Continuum Publishing. ISBN 978-0-8264-0624-8.
- May, Steven W. (1980b). "The Poems of Edward DeVere, Seventeenth Earl of Oxford and of Robert Devereux, Second Earl of Essex". Studies in Philology. 77 (5). University of North Carolina Press: 1–132.
- May, Steven W. (1991). The Elizabethan Courtier Poets: The Poems and Their Contexts. University of Missouri Press. ISBN 978-0-8262-0749-4.
- May, Steven W. (2004). "The Seventeenth Earl of Oxford as Poet and Playwright". Tennessee Law Review. 72 (1). Tennessee Law Review Association: 221–54. ISSN 0040-3288.
- McCrea, Scott (2005). The Case for Shakespeare: The End of the Authorship Question. Greenwood Publishing Group. ISBN 978-0-275-98527-1.
- McMichael, George L.; Glenn, Edgar M. (1962). Shakespeare and His Rivals: A Casebook on the Authorship Controversy. Odyssey Press. OCLC 2113359.
- Nelson, Alan H. (2003). Monstrous Adversary: The Life of Edward de Vere, 17th Earl of Oxford. Liverpool University Press. ISBN 978-0-85323-678-8.
- Nelson, Alan H. (2004). "Stratford Si! Essex No!". Tennessee Law Review. 72 (1). Tennessee Law Review Association: 149–69. ISSN 0040-3288.
- Ogburn, Charlton; Ogburn, Dorothy (1952). This Star of England. New York: Coward-McCann. OCLC 359186. Archived from the original on 17 July 2011.
- Ogburn, Charlton (1984). The Mysterious William Shakespeare: The Man Behind the Mask. New York: Dodd, Mead & Co.
- Ross, Terry. "What Did George Puttenham Really Say About Oxford And Why Does It Matter?". The Shakespeare Authorship Page. David Kathman and Terry Ross.
- Schoenbaum, S. (1991). Shakespeare's Lives (2nd ed.). Oxford University Press. ISBN 978-0-19-818618-2.
- Schoone-Jongen, Terence G. (2008). Shakespeare's Companies: William Shakespeare's Early Career and the Acting Companies, 1577–1594. Studies in Performance and Early Modern Drama. Ashgate Publishing. ISBN 978-0-7546-6434-5.
- Shapiro, James (2010). Contested Will: Who Wrote Shakespeare?. Faber and Faber. ISBN 978-0-571-23576-6.
- Shapiro, James (2011). Contested Will: Who Wrote Shakespeare?. Simon and Schuster. ISBN 978-1-4165-4163-9.
- Smith, Emma (2008). "The Shakespeare Authorship Debate Revisited". Literature Compass. 5 (April). Blackwell Publishing: 618–32. doi:10.1111/j.1741-4113.2008.00549.x.
- Smith, Irwin (1964). Shakespeare's Blackfriars Playhouse: Its History and Design. New York University Press. ISBN 978-0-8147-0391-5.
- Sobran, Joseph (1997). Alias Shakespeare: Solving the Greatest Literary Mystery of All Time. New York: Simon and Schuster.
- Stritmatter, Roger (2001). The Marginalia of Edward de Vere's Geneva Bible: Providential Discovery, Literary Reasoning, and Historical Consequence (PhD). University of Massachusetts. Archived from the original on 8 August 2012.
- Vaughan, Alden T. (2008). "William Strachey's "True Reportory" and Shakespeare: A Closer Look at the Evidence". Shakespeare Quarterly. 59 (3). The Johns Hopkins University Press: 245–73. doi:10.1353/shq.0.0017. S2CID 161199723.
- Velz, John W. (2006), "Shakespeare and the Geneva Bible: The Circumstances", in Kozuka, Takashi; Mulryne, J.R. (eds.), Shakespeare, Marlowe, Jonson: new directions in biography, Ashgate Publishing, pp. 113–19, ISBN 978-0-7546-5442-1
- Vickers, Brian (2004). Shakespeare, Co-Author: A Historical Study of Five Collaborative Plays. Oxford University Press. ISBN 978-0-19-926916-7.
- Wadsworth, Frank (1958). The Poacher from Stratford: A Partial Account of the Controversy over the Authorship of Shakespeare's Plays. Berkeley: University of California Press.
