= Edward Dyer =

English courtier and poet

Sir Edward Dyer (October 1543 – May 1607) was an English courtier and poet.

== Life ==
The son of Sir Thomas Dyer, Kt., he was born at Sharpham Park, Glastonbury, Somerset. He was educated, according to Anthony Wood, either at Balliol College, Oxford or at Broadgates Hall (later Pembroke College, Oxford), and left after taking a degree. After some time abroad, he appeared at Elizabeth I's court. His first patron was Robert Dudley, 1st Earl of Leicester, who seems to have thought of putting him forward as a rival to Sir Christopher Hatton for the queen's favour. He is mentioned by Gabriel Harvey, along with Sir Philip Sidney, as one of the ornaments of the court. Sidney, in his will, bequeathed his books equally between Fulke Greville and Dyer. He was made steward of Woodstock in 1570.

He was employed by Elizabeth on a mission (1584) to the Low Countries, and in 1589 was sent to Denmark. In a commission to inquire into manors unjustly alienated from the crown in the west country he did not altogether please the queen, but nevertheless received a grant of some forfeited lands in Somerset in 1588. He was returned the Member of Parliament for Somerset in 1589 and 1593.

He was knighted and made Chancellor of the Order of the Garter in 1596. William Oldys said of him that he "would not stoop to fawn," and some of his verses seem to show that he disliked the pressures of life at court. Under James I he lost the stewardship of Woodstock around 1604.

He died in 1607 and was buried in the chancel of St Saviour's, Southwark, on 11 May 1607 (21 May N.S.). Administration of his estate was granted to his sister Margaret.

== Works ==
Wood says that many thought Dyer to be a Rosicrucian, and that he was a firm believer in alchemy, although it is doubtful that an organised Rosicrucian movement existed during Dyer's lifetime. He had a great reputation as a poet among his contemporaries, but very little of his work has survived. George Puttenham, in the Arte of English Poesie speaks of "Maister Edward Dyar, for Elegie most sweete, solemne, and of high conceit." One of the poems once universally accepted as his is "My Mynde to me a kingdome is", which Steven W. May considers as possibly written by Edward de Vere, 17th Earl of Oxford.

Among the poems in England's Helicon (1600), signed S.E.D., and included in Dr A.B. Grosart's collection of Dyer's works (Miscellanies of the Fuller Worthies Library, vol. iv, 1876) is the charming pastoral "My Phillis hath the morninge sunne," but this comes from the Phillis of Thomas Lodge. Grosart also prints a prose tract entitled The Prayse of Nothing (1585). The Sixe Idillia from Theocritus, reckoned by John Payne Collier among Dyer's works, were dedicated to, not written by, him.

In 1943 Alden Brooks proposed Sir Edward Dyer as a candidate in the Shakespearean authorship question in his book Will Shakspere and the Dyer’s Hand.

Further see: Ralph Sargant, At the Court of Queen Elizabeth: The Life and Lyrics of Edward Dyer. OUP, 1935 Steven May, The Elizabethan Courtier Poets: Their Poems and Their Contexts. University of Missouri Press, 1991.

== In media ==
Episode 1 of the British TV series Help has Poll (Cathy Tyson) reciting Dyer's "My Mind to Me a Kingdom Is".
