= Oxfordian =

Oxfordian may refer to:

- Oxfordian (stage), a geological time interval in the Jurassic period
- Oxfordian theory of Shakespeare authorship, the view that Edward de Vere wrote under Shakespeare's name
- A person or thing associated with Oxford or Oxford University
