= Prince Tudor theory =

Theory

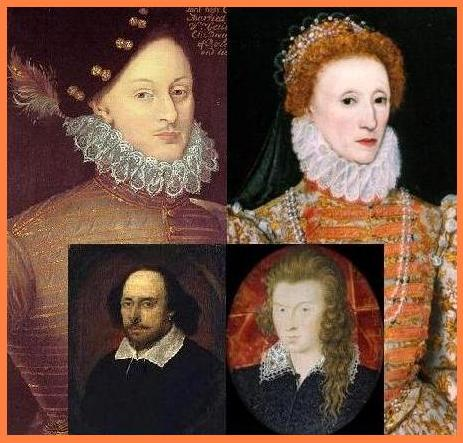
The alleged parents and sons (inset): Edward de Vere and Queen Elizabeth; Shakespeare and Southampton.

The Prince Tudor theory (also known as Tudor Rose theory) is a variant of the Oxfordian theory of Shakespeare authorship, which asserts that Edward de Vere, 17th Earl of Oxford, was the true author of the works published under the name of William Shakespeare. The Prince Tudor variant holds that Oxford and Queen Elizabeth I were lovers and had a child who was raised as Henry Wriothesley, 3rd Earl of Southampton. The theory followed earlier arguments that Francis Bacon was a son of the queen. A later version of the theory, known as "Prince Tudor II" states that Oxford was himself a son of the queen, and thus the father of his own half-brother.

This hidden history is supposed to explain why Oxford dedicated the narrative poems Venus and Adonis (1593) and The Rape of Lucrece (1594) to Southampton and to explain aspects of the poems' contents. The content of Shakespeare's sonnets has also been used to support the theory, as, to a lesser extent, have episodes in the plays.

The Prince Tudor theory has created a division among Oxfordians. Many orthodox Oxfordians regard the theory as an impediment to Oxford's recognition as Shakespeare, whereas the Prince Tudor theorists maintain that their theory better explains Oxford's life and the reasons for his writing under a pen name.

== Background ==
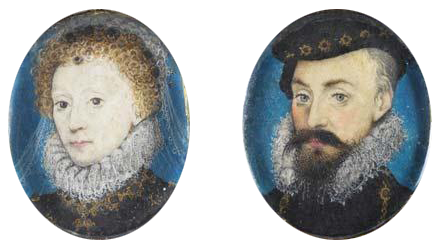
A pair of stamp-sized miniatures by Nicholas Hilliard, depicting Queen Elizabeth and the Earl of Leicester, claimed by some Baconians to be the parents of Francis Bacon and possibly others.

The theory that the author of Shakespeare's works was connected to a secret romance and child of the queen dates back to the writings of Orville Ward Owen and Elizabeth Wells Gallup, who believed that Francis Bacon was the true author of the plays. In his book Sir Francis Bacon's Cipher Story (1893–5), Owen claimed to have discovered a secret history of the Elizabethan era hidden in cipher-form in Bacon/Shakespeare's works. According to Owen, Bacon revealed that Elizabeth was secretly married to Robert Dudley, Earl of Leicester, who fathered both Bacon himself and Robert Devereux, 2nd Earl of Essex, the latter ruthlessly executed by his own mother in 1601. Bacon was the true heir to the throne of England, but had been excluded from his rightful place. This tragic life-story was the secret hidden in the plays.

Elizabeth Gallup developed Owen's views, arguing that a bi-literal cipher, which she had identified in the First Folio of Shakespeare's works, revealed concealed messages confirming that Bacon was the queen's son. This argument was taken up by several other writers, notably C.Y.C. Dawbarn in Uncrowned (1913) and Alfred Dodd The Personal Poems of Francis Bacon (1931). In Dodd's account Bacon was a national redeemer, who, deprived of his ordained public role as monarch, instead performed a spiritual transformation of the nation in private through his work. As he later wrote, "He was born for England, to set the land he loved on new lines, 'to be a Servant to Posterity'".

J. Thomas Looney founded Oxfordian theory in his book Shakespeare Identified (1920). Looney did not include any arguments about secret marriages or hidden children. However, his theory soon gained adherents who adapted the earlier Baconian arguments to the new Oxfordian position. Looney expressed his disapproval of the development in a letter from 1933, which states that his followers Percy Allen and Bernard M. Ward were "advancing certain views respecting Oxford and Queen Eliz. which appear to me extravagant & improbable, in no way strengthen Oxford’s Shakespeare claims, and are likely to bring the whole cause into ridicule." Ward's father had been an early supporter of Looney; Allen was a theatre critic.

== Prince Tudor Part I ==
=== Percy Allen ===
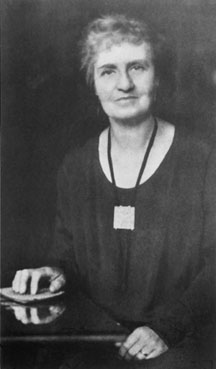
Medium Hester Dowden, who provided support for both Baconian and Oxfordian advocates of "Prince Tudor".

Ward did not develop the argument in his biography of Oxford, or in other published works. Allen, however, did. He published his initial views on Oxford and Shakespeare in 1932, but did not develop his full theory until 1934 in his book Anne Cecil, Elizabeth & Oxford. In this he argues that Elizabeth and Oxford had an illegitimate child, who was given the name William Hughes, and who became an actor under the stage-name "William Shakespeare". He adopted the name because his father, Oxford, was already using it as a pen-name for his plays. Oxford had borrowed the name from a third Shakespeare, the man of that name from Stratford-upon-Avon, who was a law student at the time, but who was never an actor or a writer.

As an illegitimate child, Hughes/Shakespeare had a "bar sinister" and could never have inherited the crown, but was "a glorious future for England that remained unrealised", as Helen Hackett puts it. Had he been able to claim the crown, the boy would have founded a line of kings that would have excluded the Stuarts, and thus protected England from the disasters brought about by that dynasty. The story of events is contained in the sonnets, which were written by Oxford to his actor son, who is the Fair Youth. The queen is the Dark Lady.

Allen's theory was not well received by many Oxfordians, including Sigmund Freud, a supporter of Looney, who wrote to Allen to express his disapproval. Oxfordian Louis P. Bénézet did pursue a modified version in 1937, but only accepted that the sonnets were written to an actor son of the Earl's, not that the boy was a child of the queen. Allen's theory was later altered to the more acceptable view that the Earl of Southampton, Henry Wriothesley, was the hidden child, not Hughes/Shakespeare. Allen later claimed to have contacted the spirits of Shakespeare, Oxford, Bacon and Elizabeth through a medium, Hester Dowden. Apparently, the spirits confirmed this theory, adding that Oxford was the leader of a collaborative effort among poets and scholars to create the works. It was also revealed that Oberon in A Midsummer Night's Dream was a portrait of Oxford's and Elizabeth's brilliant son. Alfred Dodd had previously consulted the same medium, who had confirmed Dodd's theories about Francis Bacon, but the spirit of Bacon now told Allen that Dowden had been innocently misled by another spirit on that occasion. These events forced Allen to stand down as president of the Oxfordian organisation the Shakespeare Fellowship.

Allen published his discoveries in 1947 under the title Talks with Elizabethans. He stated that the son of Oxford and Elizabeth was born in 1575. Lady Southampton had also given birth to "an illegitimate child" while her husband was imprisoned. The queen "arranged for her own son to be substituted for Lady Southampton's baby, and to be brought up as the legitimate third Earl of Southampton". In this version of events, Shakespeare of Stratford was reinstated as an actor and even as a writer. He helped Oxford and the others to write the plays, generally adding comic material. Indeed, he and Oxford were close friends.

=== Later writers ===
The theory was developed further by Dorothy and Charlton Ogburn in their biography of Edward De Vere, 17th Earl of Oxford, This Star of England (1952). They also adopted the view that Southampton was the child of the queen and Oxford. They cited evidence from Shakespeare's plays and poetry that Oxford had drawn from his own life experiences to create the characters and events in the works attributed to "William Shakespeare." After his concealed birth Southampton was raised by parental surrogates. They asserted that the narrative poem Venus and Adonis, dedicated to Southampton, described the circumstances of his conception in the affair between Oxford (Adonis) and the queen (Venus). Southampton was also the "Fair Youth" of the sonnets and that the first 17 sonnets (often called the "procreation sonnets") were written by Oxford to his natural son, urging him to marry and produce an heir. Like Allen before them, the Ogburns rejected the supposition that the poet and the Fair Youth were homosexual lovers, stressing instead the fatherly tone of the sonnets addressing the Fair Youth.

The Prince Tudor theory was further expanded by Elisabeth Sears' Shakespeare and the Tudor Rose (2002), Hank Whittemore's The Monument (2005), and Helen Heightsman Gordon's The Secret Love Story in Shakespeare's Sonnets (2008). Sears explores how Elizabeth might have concealed one or more pregnancies, but decided to remain unmarried for political reasons. Whittemore believes the sonnets emphasize the royal blood of Henry Wriothesley, who was convicted of treason for participation in the Essex Rebellion of 1601, but who otherwise might have been named as successor to his mother, Queen Elizabeth I. Gordon emphasizes the love story between Elizabeth Tudor and Edward De Vere, citing an alleged historical reference to their love affair in 1572–73. Gordon believes that the mysterious dedication to the sonnets published in 1609 has encrypted the names of the love child and his parents, their three mottos, and a clue as to the probable date of conception, "Twelfth Night" of 1573.

The term "Prince Tudor" was also used by Baconians who continued to follow the ideas of Owen and Gallup. In 1973 Margaret Barsi-Greene published I, Prince Tudor, wrote Shakespeare: an autobiography from his two ciphers in poetry and prose. This purported to be an autobiography written by Bacon hidden within his other writings. In 1992 the playwright Paula Fitzgerald adapted the book for the theatre. In 2006 Virginia M. Fellows, an admirer of Owen who had rediscovered his deciphering machine, published The Shakespeare Code promoting Owen's views. In the following year, another variation on the theory was created by Robert Nield in Breaking the Shakespeare Codes (2007). He adapted elements of Allen's "William Hughes" theory and Owen's model, arguing that anagrams in the sonnets and other works actually point to a "William Hastings", who was the real Shakespeare and also the illegitimate child of Elizabeth and Leicester.

== Prince Tudor Part II ==
A variation of the Oxfordian form of the theory, known as Prince Tudor Theory Part II, advances the belief that Oxford was the son of Queen Elizabeth I, born in July 1548 at Cheshunt, Hertfordshire. This theory asserts that Princess Elizabeth, then fourteen years old, had a child by her stepuncle and stepmother's fourth husband, Thomas Seymour, and that the child of this affair was secretly placed in the home of John de Vere, 16th Earl of Oxford, and raised as Edward de Vere, 17th Earl of Oxford.

Oxford: Son of Queen Elizabeth I (2001) by Paul Streitz is the primary work advancing Prince Tudor Theory Part II. In addition to making Oxford the queen's son by Seymour, the book also revives the notion that the "Virgin Queen" had children by the Earl of Leicester. These were Elizabeth Leighton, Francis Bacon, Mary Sidney, Robert Cecil, 1st Earl of Salisbury, and Robert Devereux, 2nd Earl of Essex. Finally, she bore Henry Wriothesley, who was the result of an incestuous relationship between Oxford and his mother, the Queen.

This aspect of the Prince Tudor Part II theory is not widely accepted among Oxfordians; most believe that the established date of birth for Oxford (12 April 1550) is accurate. Thus Elizabeth (born 7 September 1533) would have been 17 years older than Oxford.

Streitz also asserts that Oxford did not die in 1604, but was abducted. The book claims that Oxford was banished to the island Mersea in the English Channel, where he completed Shake-speares Sonnets and The Tempest. He was also the "hidden genius" behind the King James Bible (published in 1611), the unified style of which indicates that it was written by "one clear hand", though much was retained from earlier translations. He died at the end of 1608. This projected date of death is based on the claim that the first written statement referring to Oxford as deceased was in January 1609, followed by the publication of the sonnets ascribed to the "ever-living" poet. Streitz follows the common Oxfordian argument that "ever-living" is a euphemism for "deceased".

Further arguments for Prince Tudor II are made in Shakespeare's Lost Kingdom (2010) by Charles Beauclerk, 15th Duke of St Albans, a descendant of Edward de Vere. Beauclerk follows Streitz in claiming that Oxford lived on after 1604, but does not state that he was abducted and exiled. He suggests that he went into hiding with the help of William Stanley, 6th Earl of Derby.

=== Dramatisation ===
The Prince Tudor II scenario also constitutes the main plot of the feature film Anonymous (2011), written by John Orloff. The film dramatizes events leading to the Essex Rebellion against Queen Elizabeth. Against this background, flashbacks identify earlier episodes in De Vere's life. His literary genius is revealed in plays written for performance at court, but seeing the power of popular theatre he decides to write for the public stage using a frontman, William Shakespeare. A lover of the queen, de Vere fathers Southampton, who later becomes an ally of Essex. The latter's "rebellion" is portrayed as an attempt to overthrow Oxford's longtime enemy the hunchbacked Robert Cecil, not an attack on the Queen. Oxford hopes to support Essex by using his play Richard III to whip up anti-Cecil feeling. He is outmanoeuvred when Cecil discovers his plans. Cecil then tells Oxford that the earl himself is a son of the queen. Essex and Southampton are arrested and condemned. Devastated, Oxford agrees to Elizabeth's demand that he remain anonymous as part of a bargain for saving their son from execution as a traitor.

In the DVD commentary on the film, Orloff says that he was unhappy with the scene in which Cecil asserts that Oxford is the queen's son. He had asked the director Roland Emmerich to remove it, but Emmerich insisted on retaining it.
