= Derbyite theory of Shakespeare authorship =

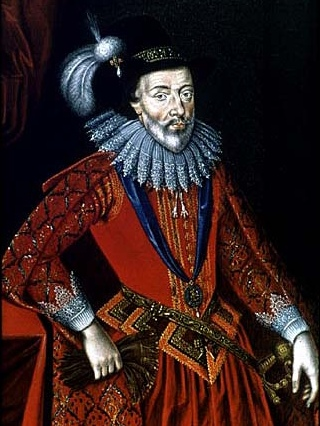
William Stanley, 6th Earl of Derby

The Derbyite theory of Shakespeare authorship is the view that William Stanley, 6th Earl of Derby (1561–1642), was the true author of the works of William Shakespeare. Derby is one of several individuals who have been claimed by advocates of the Shakespeare authorship question to be the true author of Shakespeare's works.

The theory was first proposed in 1891, and was taken up predominantly by French writers in the mid-twentieth century.

Mainstream scholarship dismisses all alternative candidates for authorship of the works, but accepts that Shakespeare sometimes worked in collaborations with other professional playwrights such as George Peele and John Fletcher. Some mainstream writers have taken the view that Derby may have had links to Shakespeare. Some of the Derbyite arguments about Love's Labour's Lost and A Midsummer Night's Dream have also been integrated into mainstream scholarship.

== Greenstreet ==
Derby's candidacy was first raised as a possibility in 1891 by the archivist James H. Greenstreet, who identified a pair of letters written in 1599 by the Jesuit spy George Fenner in which he reported that Derby was:

busied only in penning comedies for the common players.

Fenner was disappointed that Derby was devoting himself to cultural pursuits rather than politics because his family were thought to be sympathetic to the Catholic cause and were possible claimants of the throne in the event of Queen Elizabeth's death.

Greenstreet argued that Fenner's dismissive comment revealed that unknown works were penned by Derby. He argued that these could be identified with the Shakespeare canon. He suggested that the comic scenes in Love's Labour's Lost were influenced by a pageant of the Nine Worthies only ever performed in Derby's home town of Chester. He also argued that the comic character of the pedant Holofernes in the play is based on Derby's tutor Richard Lloyd, who wrote a dramatic poem about the Nine Worthies that appears to be parodied in Holofernes' own production on the topic in the play. Greenstreet attempted to develop his ideas in a second paper, but died suddenly at the age of forty-five in 1892, leaving his arguments incomplete.

== Frazer ==
Greenstreet's theory was revived by the American writer Robert Frazer, who argued in The Silent Shakespeare (1915) that the actor William Shakespeare merely commercialised the productions of other authors, mainly by adding vulgar comic scenes. He believed that Derby was the principal author of the more elevated material in the Shakespeare plays, though both he and Shakespeare were probably adapting older works. Derby was responsible for "those fine passages which Will Shakespeare and his fellows sometimes omitted in representation in order to make room for their own buffooneries". He was, however, the sole author of the sonnets and narrative poems. Frazer concludes that "William Stanley was William Shakespeare".

== Lefranc ==
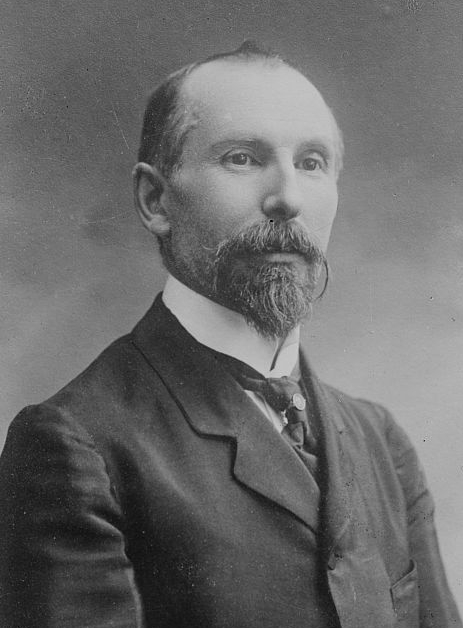
Abel Lefranc

The idea was then taken up in France and was first advocated in scholarly detail when the Rabelais expert Abel Lefranc published his 1918 book Sous le masque de William Shakespeare: William Stanley, VIe comte de Derby. Lefranc added to Greenstreet's arguments, providing scholarly details.

=== Love's Labour's Lost ===
Lefranc drew on the fact that Derby had spent some years travelling in Europe, during which time he may have witnessed events in the Court of Navarre that are reflected in the more serious portions of Love's Labour's Lost. Lefranc stated that the play is a "reflection of a scintillating episode in our [France's] history ...The very substance of the play, far more than scholars have imagined, is impregnated with quite recognisable French elements." He insisted that the author must have had "virtually impeccable and absolutely amazing acquaintance with aspects France and Navarre of the period that could have been known only to a very limited number of people".

He argued that the events on which the play was based occurred between 1578 and 1584. The "scintillating episode" was the visit of Marguerite de Valois and her companions to her estranged husband Henry of Navarre, the future king Henry IV of France. Henry was accompanied by "a handsome troupe of lords and gentlemen", while Marguerite was accompanied by her mother Catherine de' Medici and a large entourage. The visit occasioned elaborate festivities. Disputes about the control of Aquitaine and the rights to a dowry, alluded to in the play, were the motivation for the visit.

Lefranc also provided further details on the role of the Nine Worthies, arguing that the play referred to tapestries depicting the subject in Navarre. The satirical comment that one of the badly-acted worthies in the play "will be scraped out of the painted cloth for this" implies a reference to the tapestries. Lefranc also expanded on the similarities between Lloyd's poem about the worthies and the pageant in the play.

=== Other plays ===
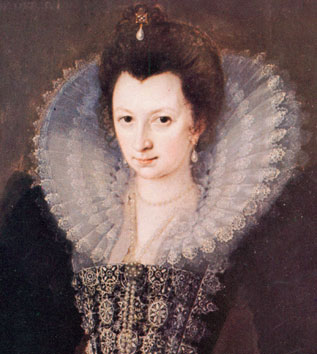
Lefranc believed that A Midsummer Night's Dream was written by Derby for his wife Elizabeth on the occasion of their wedding

Lefranc identified a number of other links between Derby and characters in Shakespeare's plays. In addition to Love's Labour's Lost, he concentrated on A Midsummer Night's Dream, The Merry Wives of Windsor, Twelfth Night, Hamlet, and The Tempest. He argued that A Midsummer Night's Dream was written for Derby's own marriage to Elizabeth de Vere. The Pyramus and Thisbe section was "evidently modelled on one of the popular plays performed by the artisans of Chester".

Lefranc believed that Hamlet contained coded references to the story of Mary, Queen of Scots, and her first husband Lord Darnley. Ophelia in Hamlet was a portrait of Hélène de Tournon, a young woman who is supposed to have died of love and whose story was told by Pierre de Ronsard. Lefranc interpreted Hamlet's relationship with the Players as a reference to Derby's own involvement with the theatre, discerning in the figure of Hamlet a self-portrait, in which Hamlet's travels beyond Denmark represent William Stanley, Earl of Derby's own sojourn in continental Europe. He claimed Jacques in As You Like It was also a self portrait. Both figures are aristocrats but also outsiders with a "tendency to melancholia".

The Merry Wives of Windsor was based on events in Derby's life and the character of Malvolio in Twelfth Night was a parody of William Ffarrington, a steward who worked for the Stanley family.

Prospero in The Tempest was based on John Dee, with whom Derby was well acquainted. The play is unusual for portraying the use of magic in a positive way, which suggested to Lefranc that Derby was justifying the activities of his friend. He argued that the name Ariel derived from Dee's invocation of the spirits "Anael and Uriel".

=== Other evidence ===
Lefranc also discussed Stanley's long-standing connections to the theatre. His older brother Ferdinando Stanley, 5th Earl of Derby, had formed a group of players which evolved into Shakespeare's troupe The King's Men. Derby also patronized this troupe, which became "Derby's Men", and he gave financial support to the Children of Paul's. Stanley may have been deterred from publishing in his own name because of the sensitive content of the works and the aristocratic "stigma of print", which associated publication with vulgar commercialism.

Lefranc noted that Derby was also closely associated with William Herbert, 3rd Earl of Pembroke, and his brother Philip Herbert, Earl of Montgomery and later 4th Earl of Pembroke, the two dedicatees of the 1623 Shakespearean folio. Around 1628 to 1629, when Derby released his estates to his son James, who became the 7th Earl, the named trustees were Pembroke and Montgomery. Derby appears to have supported Richard Barnfield, two of whose works were published under Shakespeare's name. His second volume of poems, Cynthia, with certain Sonnets, and the legend of Cassandra was dedicated to Derby in terms which imply close personal relations.

Lefranc believed that Derby may have had an affair with Mary Fitton, a candidate for the Dark Lady of the sonnets. Lefranc considered Derby to be sympathetic to France and to Catholicism, views he also believed to be present in the plays. Derby's proficiency in French would explain Shakespeare's use of the language in Henry V. Lefranc also noted that Derby's own name is strikingly similar to the name 'William Shakespeare'; Stanley's first name was William, his initials were W.S., and he was known to sign himself, 'Will'.

Lefranc continued to publish arguments for his theory until shortly before his death in 1952. Subsequent publications included La réalité dans le 'Songe d'une Nuit d'été'' (Geneva, 1920), Le Secret de William Stanley (Brussels, 1923) and A la découverte de Shakespeare (Paris, 1945–50).

After Lefranc, several authors took up Derby's cause, including Jacques Boulenger, J. Depoin, and Mathias Morhardt in France and Belgium. Other supporters included R. Macdonald Lucas and J. le Roy White.

=== Mainstream response ===
Some of Lefranc's arguments have been taken seriously by mainstream commentators, though without accepting his claims regarding authorship. In 1925 Oscar J. Campbell approved his theory that Love's Labour's Lost was based on the 1578 events at the court of Navarre, arguing that it was a fact "quite beyond proof". Campbell suggests that Shakespeare probably collaborated with an aristocrat, arguing that the intimacy portrayed in Hamlet between the prince and the players indicates that such collaboration was not unlikely. The argument for a link to the events of 1578 still continues to be used, though it has been noted that Lefranc did not originate it. It was first suggested in 1899 by John Phelps. More recently, E.A.J. Honigmann agreed that the first production of A Midsummer Night's Dream was performed at Derby's wedding banquet, not to mention that the bride's father was none other than Edward de Vere, 17th Earl of Oxford. Other of Lefranc's arguments were disputed. The claim that Shakespeare parodied Lloyd's literary work was soon attacked on the grounds that Shakespeare's worthies do not correspond to Lloyd's.

== Titherley ==
The most energetic Derbyite after Lefranc was the chemist Arthur Walsh Titherley, who became Derby's principal advocate in the mid-20th century. In his book Shakespeare's Identity he accuses Shakespeare of abusing his position as Derby's frontman by illicitly selling plays for publication and then blackmailing Derby by threatening to reveal his secret. No evidence is offered for these assertions. Titherley also used handwriting evidence and even genetics to support his views. In particular Titherley took up the widespread view that part of the manuscript of the play Sir Thomas More was written by the same person who wrote Shakespeare's published works. He argued that analysis proved the handwriting to be Derby's. He then claimed that Derby's descent from various noble families proved that he had the genetic inheritance lacking in the Stratford Shakespeare.

Titherley also attempted to disprove the claims of other alternative candidates, declaring that Francis Bacon and Edward de Vere, 17th Earl of Oxford, were both incapable of writing the plays. Bacon was not an imaginative writer at all. Oxford's surviving poetry indicates that he was "usually clogged by personal feelings" and "knew not the magic of verbal enchantment, never soared into the infinite or plumbed philosophic depths, nor did he ever achieve Shakespeare's peculiar imagery".

Titherley published editions of sonnets and plays as Derby's work.

== Stanley monuments in the style of Shakespeare ==
Researchers have noted the distinctly "Shakespearean" ring of two inscriptions found on monuments to members of the Stanley family who died in 1632 and 1633, almost two decades after the death of the Stratford man.

The one in Chelsea Old Church on the tomb of Sir Robert Stanley, Derby's son, (modernised spelling) reads:

To say a Stanley lies here, that alone

were epitaph enough; no brass, no stone,

no glorious tomb, no monumental hearse,

no guilded trophy or lamp-laboured verse

can dignify his grave or set it forth

like the immortal fame of his own worth.

Then, reader, fix not here, but quit this room

and fly to Abraham's bosom – there's his tomb.

There rests his soul, and for his other parts

they are embalmed and lodged in good men's hearts.

A braver monument of stone or lime,

no art can raise, for this shall outlast time.

== Other theories ==
Although not identified as the sole author of the canon, William Stanley is often mentioned as a leader or participant in the "group theory" of Shakespearean authorship, according to which several individuals contributed to the works.

J. Thomas Looney, who created the alternative Oxfordian theory, was convinced that his candidate, the Earl of Oxford, would never have written The Tempest. He later joined with George Greenwood to establish The Shakespeare Fellowship, accepting Greenwood's view that Derby probably wrote The Tempest. Some later followers of Oxford concurred. In his biography of Oxford, B. M. Ward suggested that the two aristocrats collaborated, accepting aspects of both Lefranc's and Looney's views, arguing that Derby must have at least contributed to Love's Labour's Lost and other plays.

A. J. Evans in Shakespeare's Magic Circle (1956) argued that Derby was the principal author of the plays, with Oxford in a lesser role, and that both passed drafts to other leading men of the day, including Francis Bacon and Roger Manners, 5th Earl of Rutland, for emendations and additions. Evans drew on a recent argument that the plot of Measure for Measure was similar to the events that occurred in Paris in 1582, when the king Henry III of France was absent. In his place, the governor Jerome Angenouste condemned an individual called Claude Tonart to death for fornication, just as Claudio is in the play. Tonart had seduced the daughter of the president of the Parlement of Paris. Like Claudio he was eventually pardoned. Evans argues that Derby was in Paris during these events, and that the play could only have been written by an eyewitness.

While accepting Shakespeare's own authorship of the canon, Leo Daugherty, who wrote Stanley's life for the Oxford Dictionary of National Biography (2004), has argued in a recent book that Stanley is the Fair Youth of Shakespeare's sonnets and that Barnfield is the "Rival Poet".

== Cultural references ==
A poster for the play El otro William, which dramatises Derbyite theory.

In 1998 the Spanish impresario Jaime Salom produced the play El otro William (The Other William), which portrays Derby as the true author and Shakespeare himself as a "rascally, opportunistic actor".

The theory plays a significant role in Jennifer Lee Carrell's 2007 novel Interred with their Bones in which the search for the lost manuscript of the play Cardenio is linked to authorship issues communicated obliquely in newly discovered letters from Derby.
