= Louis T. Benezet =

American educator

Louis Tomlinson Benezet (June 29, 1915 in La Crosse, Wisconsin – January 23, 2002 in Mill Valley, California) was an American educator, education administrator and president at four U.S. universities. He was the son of Louis P. Bénézet, a professor at Dartmouth College.

== Biography ==
=== Education ===
He received his B.A. at Dartmouth College in 1936, his MA in psychology at Reed College in 1939, and his Ph.D. in college and educational administration at Columbia University in 1942.

=== Career ===
In 1943, he was an Associate Professor of Psychology at Knox College. His 1943 work General Education in the Progressive College explores the educational system at three progressive colleges, namley Sarah Lawrence College and Bard College in New York and Bennington College in Vermont.

From 1948 to 1955 he was president of Allegheny College, and from 1955 to 1963, president of Colorado College. He transformed Colorado College into a nationally recognized training center. The annual "Louis Benezet Award" at Coloardo College was named after him.

From 1963 to 1970 he was president of Claremont Graduate School and University Center in Claremont, California. As president of Claremont, he left a nationally important legacy, since he organized a change in the "College Rating System", introducing a system which reflected the actual performance of alumni in later life, by following-up on former students with greater efficiency. From 1970 to 1976 he was president of the State University of New York at Albany.

Benezet took the view that there had been too much of a readiness to accept the claims of private higher education to improve economic efficiency, the personal treatment of students, to set high standards, and encourage diversity.

== Bibliography ==
- 1943 General Education in the Progressive College. New York, Teachers College, Columbia University Press.
- 1961 "Is Higher Education a Commodity?" In G. Kerry Smith (ed.). Goals for Higher Education in a Decade of Decision. Washington, D.C., Association for Higher Education. pp. 241–244.
- 1962 "The Office of the President." In Gerald P. Burns (ed.). Administrators in Higher Education: Their Functions and Coordination. New York, Harper and Brothers. pp. 99–110.
- 1965 "College Groups and the Claremont Example." In Logan Wilson (ed.). Emerging Patterns in American Higher Education. Washington, D.C., American Council on Education. pp. 199–203.
- 1969 "Continuity and Change: The Need for Both." In John Caffrey (ed.). The Future Academic Community--Continuity and Change. Washington, D.C., American Council on Education. pp. 15–29.
- 1977a Private Higher Education and Public Funding. Washington, D.C., American Council on Education.
- 1977b "Uses and Abuses of Departments." In Dean E. McHenry, et al. Academic Departments: Problems, Variations and Alternatives. San Francisco, Jossey-Bass.
- 1981, et al. Style and Substance: Leadership and the College Presidency. Washington, D.C., American Council on Education.
- 1999 "People versus pyramids: New goals for the elite college", The Colorado College Studies
