= Ward Elliott =

American political scientist (1937–2022)

- Born: August 6, 1937
- Died: December 6, 2022 (aged 85)
- Occupations: Professor, political scientist
- Known for: Political theory, democratic theory

Ward Elliott (August 6, 1937 – December 6, 2022) was an American political scientist who was the Burnet C. Wohlford Professor of American Political Institutions at Claremont McKenna College (CMC) in California. Elliott had been a professor at CMC since 1968.

== Education ==
Elliott held a Bachelor of Arts (1959), Master's Degree and Doctorate of Philosophy (1968) from Harvard University and a law degree (1964) from the University of Virginia.

== Work ==
Elliott criticized the US Supreme Court's record on voting reforms in his 1974 book, The Rise of Guardian Democracy, and argued that reform should be initiated by citizens by democratic processes and not imposed from above by elites.

He researched market solutions to the smog problem in Los Angeles. He was president of the California Coalition for Clean Air from 1980 to 1986. Elliott drafted the economic incentives of the Clean Air Act Amendments of 1990. After his efforts, the number of first-stage smog-alert days declined from one day in three in the 1960s to only one day in 1997.

Elliott founded and led the Claremont Shakespeare Clinic from 1987 to 1994. It used computers to analyze William Shakespeare's writings and published several papers on his and the clinic's findings. His research addressed the Shakespeare authorship question, and his results led him to dismiss the claims of 37 alternative authors of the Shakespeare canon and to reject the authenticity of over 30 poems and plays of the Shakespeare Apocrypha.

== Awards ==
- Distinguished Civilian Service Medal, 1973
- Roy C. Crocker Prize for Merit, Claremont McKenna College, 1984
- Presidential Award for Merit, Claremont McKenna College, 1999
