= Louis P. Bénézet =

Louis Paul Bénézet (March 21, 1878 – May 2, 1961) was an American educator and writer who pioneered the reform of school education in the early twentieth century.

== Early career ==
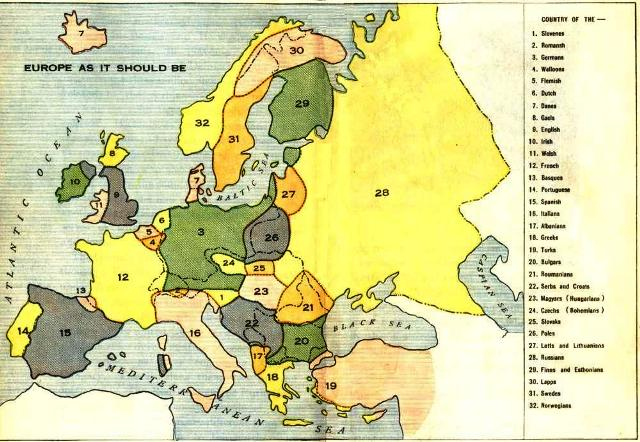
Bénézet's map of "Europe As It Should Be" (1918), depicting nations based on ethnic and linguistic criteria.

Bénézet was born in Lynn, Massachusetts. He was principal and football coach of Central High School in La Crosse, Wisconsin, from 1907 to 1908. From 1916 to 1924, Bénézet was superintendent of schools in Evansville, Indiana and, from 1924 to 1938, in Manchester, New Hampshire.

In 1918 he published The World War and What was Behind It, an account of the events leading up to World War I, which he blamed on German aggression combined with perceived threats to the traditional social order from radicals and ethnic nationalists. The book was based on a series of talks he had given about how European history had led to the creation of unstable nation-states. He included a map of "Europe As It Should Be," a template for avoiding ethnic rivalry by creating "the boundaries of the various nations as they would look if the bulk of the people of each nationality were included in a single political division."

== Innovations ==
In the late 1920s he became a pioneer of new teaching techniques, when he initiated pilot schemes in selected schools, the results of which he published 1935/36. These schemes aimed at eliminating "meaningless drills" and abolished the ritualized formal mathematics instruction to seventh grade students. He introduced what he called the new three Rs, which were "to read", "to reason", "to recite". He explained, "by reciting I did not mean giving back, verbatim, the words of the teacher or of the textbook. I meant speaking the English language. I picked out five rooms - three third grades, one combining the third and fourth grades, and one fifth grade." The intention was to ensure that students grasped the meaning of what they were learning, rather than simply memorise it.

He intentionally chose schools with a high number of immigrants, without good English language skills, arguing that in the absence of rigid mathematics teaching, the students could concentrate on developing language skills and thus assimilate more easily into the new country, promoting both integration and more rapid learning at higher levels of schooling. Such students would catch up on the mathematics, once they had learned to understand problems in English. His theory was very controversial.

== Later career ==
From 1938 to 1948 he was a professor at Dartmouth College, from which he retired in 1948 when he was in his 70s. However, he then taught for ten more years among Bradley University (IL), 1948-1950; Evansville College (IN), 1950-1952; and at Jackson College (HI), 1956-1960. In 1960 he suffered a stroke, which forced him to give up teaching. He died in Honolulu following a second stroke in May 1961.

== Shakespeare authorship question ==
His hobby was the study of the so-called Shakespeare authorship question. He became an advocate for Oxfordian theory. In his book Shakespeare and de Vere (1937) he propounded a modified version of Percy Allen's Prince Tudor theory, but did not accept Allen's belief that Oxford had a son by Queen Elizabeth I. However, he argued that the sonnets were written to an actor son of the Earl's, who performed under the name "William Shakespeare". In The Six Loves of Shake-Speare (1959), he argued that the sonnets were addressed to six different individuals. He also devised the "Bénézet test" of conjoining lines from Oxford's and Shakespeare's verse to see whether the difference was noticeable to the reader.

== Family ==
His son, Louis T. Benezet, was an influential U.S. educational administrator.

== Publications ==
- Three Years of Football at Dartmouth: being the story of the seasons of '01, '02 and '03, Self-published, 1904
- The teaching of arithmetic I, II, III: The story of an experiment, "Journal of the National Education Association" 24(8), 241-244 (1935); 24(9), 301-303 (1935); 25(1), 7-8, (1936).
- The teaching of arithmetic I, II, III, in "Humanistic Mathematics Newsletter" 6: 1991
- The World War And What Was Behind It, (2004 reprint) ISBN 1-4191-8872-0
- "Look in the Chronicles", Shakespeare Fellowship Newsletter (US) 4:3, (1943) 28
- Shakspere, Shakespeare and de Vere, Granite State Press, January 1, 1937
- The Six Loves of Shake-speare, Pageant Press, Inc., New York, 1959
- "A Hoax Three Centuries Old", American Bar Association Journal, May 1960, pp. 519–22
