= Margo Anderson (writer) =

American journalist and book author

Margo Anderson (born August 13, 1967), formerly Mark Anderson, is an American journalist and book author.

== Education ==
Anderson has a bachelor's degree in physics and a master's degree in astrophysics.

== Career ==
Anderson has written articles on science, history, and technology for a variety of national and international publications and media outlets.

Anderson's first book, "Shakespeare" by Another Name (Gotham Books, 2005), supports the Oxfordian theory that the Elizabethan court poet-playwright Edward de Vere, 17th Earl of Oxford wrote the works conventionally attributed to William Shakespeare. The book is the first Oxfordian literary biography – connecting de Vere's life to Shakespeare's plays and poems.

Anderson's second book, The Day the World Discovered the Sun (Da Capo Press, 2012), covers the historical adventures involved in, and the build-up surrounding, the 1761 and 1769 transits of Venus. The book details, in addition to the myriad far-flung voyages to record the transits, the critical leaps in progress made in oceanic navigation, and in astronomical calculations such as the precise distance from the Earth to the Sun, during this fruitful period. The book won the USA Best Book Award in the History: General category in 2013.

Anderson is news manager at IEEE Spectrum.

== Personal life ==
Anderson has a wife and children.

In September 2022 Anderson announced having transitioned as a transgender woman, with the name Margo Anderson.

== Bibliography ==
- Anderson, Mark. Shakespeare by Another Name: The Life of Edward de Vere, Earl of Oxford, the Man Who Was Shakespeare Gotham Books, 2005. ISBN 1592402151
- Anderson, Mark. The Day the World Discovered the Sun: An Extraordinary Story of Scientific Adventure and the Race to Track the Transit of Venus. Da Capo Press, 2012. ISBN 978-0306820380
