= Bernard Mordaunt Ward =

English writer and soldier (1893–1945)

- Born: 1893
- Died: 1945 (aged 51–52)
- Occupations: Soldier; Writer
- Years active: 1920–1945
- Notable work: The Seventeenth Earl of Oxford (1550–1604) from Contemporary Documents

Bernard Mordaunt Ward (20 January 1893 – 12 October 1945) was a British author and third-generation soldier most noted for his support of the Oxfordian theory of Shakespeare authorship and writing the first documentary biography of Edward de Vere, 17th Earl of Oxford.

== Biography ==
He was born in Madras, India into a military family, the son of Bernard Rowland Ward (1863–1933) and Jeanie Duffield (d. 1925). At age 18 he entered the Royal Military College, Sandhurst, as a cadet and in 1912 was commissioned as a 2nd lieutenant into the 1st King's Dragoon Guards. He was promoted to first lieutenant at the beginning of the First World War and attained the rank of captain a month before the war ended. He retired in 1927 as a member of the reserves, which he resigned in 1939 due to ill health. He was usually addressed as Captain B. M. Ward for the rest of his life. He never married and died 12 October 1945 at age 52.

From 1900 Ward's father was an instructor at the Royal Military College, as well as a respected author on military engineering. He became interested in the Shakespeare authorship question and was the main organizer of the original Shakespeare Fellowship. He was a groupist, with Sir Francis Bacon as the chief editor and organizer, and published several articles and a book about the Shakespeare authorship question. Ward followed his father in his anti-Stratfordian interests, but favoured Oxford as the true author, influenced by J. Thomas Looney's "Shakespeare" Identified in Edward De Vere, the seventeenth earl of Oxford (1920).

Ward also became chairman of the Abbotsholme Association, an organization to promote the Abbotsholme School, a private boarding and day school in Rocester, Staffordshire, and in 1934 he wrote a book about the founder, Dr Cecil Reddie, as a way to support him in a dispute over control of the school.

== Literary authorship theories ==
In 1925 Ward argued that The Arte of English Poesie, usually attributed to George Puttenham, was authored by John Lumley, a noted collector of books and art, based on biographical details gleaned from the work. Ward was refuted "heartlessly" by Willcock and Walker in their 1936 critical edition.

Ward published several articles in scholarly journals announcing his discovery that Oxford was the author of works attributed to George Gascoigne, and in 1926 he published a reprint edition of Gascoigne's A Hundreth Sundrie Flowres, which included an introduction advancing the theory that it was in fact compiled and edited by Edward de Vere, 17th Earl of Oxford. Oxford supposedly also contributed some poems and revealed his authorship using an acrostic that spelled out "Edward de Vere" in the poem "The absent lover (in ciphers) disciphering his name, doth crave some spedie relief as followeth". Ward claimed that the motto on the title page, which was signed to 22 of the 100 poems, was Oxford's; that the signature Si Fortunatus Infoelix was the posy of Christopher Hatton, a commoner, and thereby identified Hatton's contributions; and that the initials F.I. in The Poesies of George Gascoigne (1575) stood for the principal letters in Hatton's supposed motto. All of his conjectures were disproved by academic Shakespeareans, but Ward's Gascoigne theory is still put forth by some modern Oxfordians, while others have disavowed it.

== Oxford as Shakespeare ==
Taking to heart Looney's call for research to prove Oxford was Shakespeare, around 1923 Ward began digging in archives for evidence of Oxford's authorship. In 1928, he published a biography of Oxford aimed at rehabilitating the earl's reputation. Prevented by his publishing house from openly supporting the Oxfordian theory in the book, he was content to provide tacit support, portraying Oxford as a remarkable Renaissance man: a highly educated and well-travelled courtier, soldier, scholar, poet, playwright, patron of the arts, theatrical entrepreneur – in short, the perfect fit for the portrait of the author as determined by Looney's biographical reading of Shakespeare's works. He also detailed his authorship speculations in what he called "interludes" interspersed between the documented sections of the biography. For the rest of the 20th century Ward's was the only documentary biography of Oxford available until Alan Nelson's Monstrous Adversary: The Life of Edward de Vere, 17th Earl of Oxford was published in 2003.

Ward's biography has been criticized by historians for suppressing details of Oxford's life and putting aspects of his career and relationships in a favourable light. He exaggerated Oxford's military and literary accomplishments, and ignored or recast his faults. Nelson characterised Ward as "more hagiographer than historian"

Ward also helped his friend Percy Allen to develop the "Prince Tudor theory", the claim that Oxford had a son with Queen Elizabeth I. Ward and Allen believed that this secret was expressed in encoded form in the writings published under Shakespeare's name. Unlike Allen, Ward never published on the topic.

== Publications ==
- "The Authorship of the Arte of English Poesie: A Suggestion", RES I (1925) pp. 284–308.
- A Hundreth Sundrie Flowres From the Original Edition of 1573, London: F. Etchells and H. Macdonald, 1926
- The Seventeenth Earl of Oxford (1550–1604) from Contemporary Documents, London: John Murray, 1928.
- "The Famous Victories of Henry V: Its Place in Elizabethan Dramatic Literature," RES, IV (1928), pp. 270–94.
- "Queen Elizabeth and William Davison", English Historical Review (1929) 44, pp. 104–6.
- Reddie of Abbotsholme, London: George Allen & Unwin, 1934.
