= Steven W. May =

American academic

Steven W. May is an American academic and author specializing in English Renaissance poetry.

== Life ==
He obtained his B.A. at Rockford College and his M.A. and Ph.D. at the University of Chicago. He served as professor of English at Northern Illinois University, and then at Georgetown College, Georgetown, Kentucky, for 35 years, where he received the Cawthorne "Excellence in Teaching" Award in 1991. He retired from full-time teaching in 2004 and currently is a senior research fellow and the principal investigator on the "Early Modern Manuscript Poetry: Recovering our Scribal Heritage" project at the University of Sheffield.

== Works ==
=== Books ===
- Henry Stanford’s Anthology: An Edition of Cambridge University Library Manuscript Dd. 5.75 (1988)
- Sir Walter Raleigh (Twayne's English Authors Series) (1989)
- The Elizabethan Courtier Poets: The Poems and Their Contexts (1991, 1999)
- Queen Elizabeth I: Selected Works (2004), ed.
- Elizabethan Poetry: A Bibliography and First-Line Index of English Verse, 1559-1603, 3 vols. (2004) with William A. Ringler, Jr.
- In the Prayse of Writing: Early Modern Manuscript Studies: Essays in Honour of Peter Beal (2012) ed. with S. P. Cerasano

=== Articles ===
- "Tudor Aristocrats and the Mythical 'Stigma of Print'" in Renaissance Papers 10, Leigh A. Deneef and Thomas M. Hester, eds. (1980) 10: 11–18.
- "The Poems of Edward DeVere, Seventeenth Earl of Oxford and of Robert Devereux, Second Earl of Essex", Studies in Philology (1980) 77: 1–132.
- "The Seventeenth Earl of Oxford as Poet and Playwright", Tennessee Law Review (2004), 72: 221–54.
- "The Future of Manuscript Studies in Early Modern Poetry", Shakespeare Studies (2004), 32: 56–62.
- "Henry Gurney, a Norfolk Farmer, Reads Spenser and Others", Spenser Studies (2005), 20: 183–223.
- "Youthes Witte: An Unstudied Elizabethan Anthology of Printed Verse and Prose Fiction", Renaissance Papers 2006 (2006), 1-11.
- "Early Courtier Verse: Oxford, Dyer, and Gascoigne", in Early Modern English Poetry, Patrick Cheney, Andrew Hadfield, and Garrett A. Sullivan, Jr., eds. 2007, pp. 60–69.
- "How Ralegh Became a Courtier", John Donne Journal (2008), 27: 131–140.
- "The Circulation in Manuscript of Poems by King James VI and I", in Renaissance Historicisms: Essays in Honor of Arthur F. Kinney, eds. James M. Dutcher and Anne Lake Prescott, eds. 2008, pp. 206–24.
- "George Puttenham's Lewd and Lascivious Career", Texas Studies in Literature and Language (2008), 50: 143–76.
- "Popularizing Courtly Poetry: Tottel’s Miscellany and its Progeny", in The Oxford Handbook of Tudor Literature, 1485-1603, Mike Pincombe and Cathy Shrank, eds. 2009, pp. 418–33.
- "Manuscripts in Tudor England," with Heather Wolfe in A Companion to Tudor Literature, ed. Kent Cartwright. 2010, pp. 125–39.
