= William Farina =

William Edward Farina
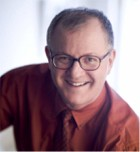
- William Farina
- Born: December 7, 1955 (age 70); LaPorte, Indiana, U.S.
- Education: Valparaiso University (JD)
- Occupations: Author, essayist
- Writing career
- Genre: Popular Non-Fiction

William Edward Farina (born December 7, 1955, in LaPorte, Indiana) is an American essayist and writer of popular non-fiction.

== Biography ==
Farina was born, reared and educated in LaPorte, Indiana. He attended Valparaiso University on a baseball athletic scholarship and received his bachelor's degree with a double major in English and Philosophy in 1978, then a J.D. degree from the same institution in 1981. That same year he was admitted to the Illinois bar and moved to Chicago, pursuing a full-time career as a real estate analyst that had previously begun in college. In 1989, he was awarded designated membership with the American Institute of Real Estate Appraisers (today the Appraisal Institute). The following year (1990), Farina was presented with a certificate of merit from Landmarks Illinois for his efforts in the field of historic building preservation. Soon afterwards in 1991, he married Marion Buckley of Decatur, Illinois, who helped to rekindle his interest in writing. Then in 2002, he accepted invitational membership with Lambda Alpha International, an honorary land economics society.

Farina and his wife participated as volunteers for the 2008 general election campaign in his native state of Indiana. Soon after this in 2009, they moved to northern Wisconsin, where they spent the next six years serving in various government-related capacities, before moving back to the Chicago area (Evanston, Illinois) in 2015, where they live and work today.

Broad contrasts in ethnic and cultural identities frequently characterize his writing style.

== Writing career ==
Spurred by the results of the 2004 elections, Farina resolved to devote spare time to educational activities. Foremost among these has been a series of books on various scholarly topics, written from a layman's perspective. Farina's first collection, "De Vere as Shakespeare: An Oxfordian Reading of the Canon" (McFarland & Company, 2006), addresses the Shakespeare authorship question. It won the 2007 Award for Scholarly Excellence presented by the Shakespeare Authorship Studies Conference of Concordia University-Portland, and earned praise in Washington State University's Rocky Mountain Review of Language and Literature. Since then, McFarland has published eleven additional works by Farina, with a 13th currently under contract for 2026.

== Works ==
De Vere as Shakespeare: An Oxfordian Reading of the Canon (2006)
Ulysses S. Grant, 1861-1864: His Rise from Obscurity to Military Greatness (2007)
Perpetua of Carthage: Portrait of a Third-Century Martyr (2008)
Chrétien de Troyes and the Dawn of Arthurian Romance (2010)
Eliot Asinof and the Truth of the Game: A Critical Study of the Baseball Writings (2011)
The German Cabaret Legacy in American Popular Music (2013)
Man Writes Dog: Canine Themes in Literature, Law and Folklore (2014)
The Afterlife of Adam Smith: The Influence, Interpretation and Misinterpretation of His Economic Philosophy (2015)
Saint James the Greater in History, Art and Culture (2018)
Italian Crime Fiction in the Era of the Anti-Mafia Movement (2020)
Screening Charles Dickens: A Survey of the Film and Television Adaptations (2022)
Florence Price: The Life, Compositions, and Influence of a Black American Composer (2024)

== Quotes ==
"Patient readers will hopefully have as much fun perusing this survey as I had assembling it. Since Smith is rarely read by anyone nowadays, and wrote during an epoch so completely different from our own, specific interpretations of his text and attempts at direct application of his ideas to contemporary problems often become a freewheeling, unaccountable business." (The Afterlife of Adam Smith)
