= Shakespeare Fellowship =

Shakespeare authorship question organisation

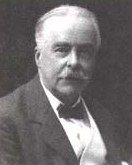

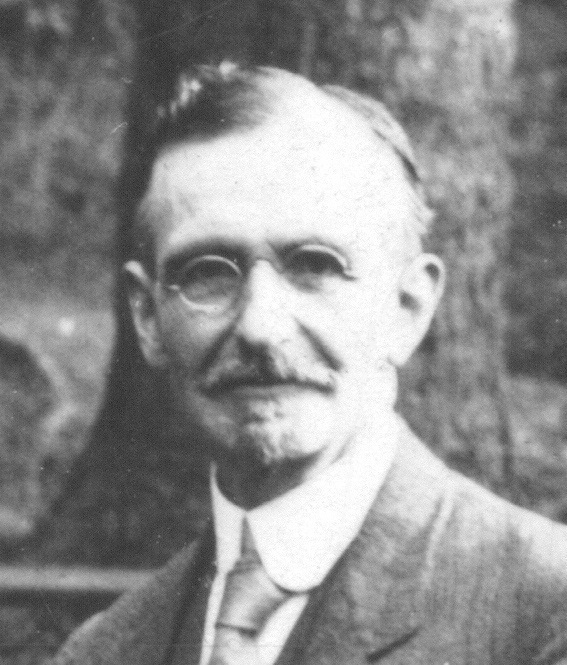
George Greenwood (top) and J. Thomas Looney, founders of the Shakespeare Fellowship.

The Shakespeare Fellowship was the name used by an organisation devoted to the Shakespeare authorship question. Originally it sought to represent all alternatives to the mainstream consensus that William Shakespeare authored the plays attributed to him, but it later became strongly identified with Oxfordian theory: promoting Edward de Vere, 17th Earl of Oxford, as the true author of the works of Shakespeare. The original organisation is now known as "The Shakespearean Authorship Trust".

A second organisation dedicated to the aims of the original Shakespeare Fellowship was founded under the name in 2001. In 2013, it merged with the Shakespeare Oxford Society to become the "Shakespeare Oxford Fellowship".

== First Shakespeare Fellowship ==
The first Shakespeare Fellowship, originally devoted to the study of the Shakespeare authorship but endorsing no particular candidate, was founded in England in 1921 after conversations between J. Thomas Looney, the founder of Oxfordian theory, and Sir George Greenwood a prominent anti-Stratfordian who had never declared his support for any particular alternative author. Bernard Rowland Ward was its principal organiser. It maintained worldwide membership, chiefly in the UK and the United States. Greenwood was made president. Leading supporters of the most prominent alternative candidates were made vice-presidents, including Looney, representing the Oxfordian position, the Baconian William T. Smedley, and the Derbyite Abel Lefranc.

Greenwood retained the presidency until his death in 1928. After his death the Fellowship became increasingly associated with Oxfordian theory. Oxfordian Montagu William Douglas succeeded Greenwood as president, holding the position from 1928 to 1945. Percy Allen was elected in 1944 to replace Douglas, but he resigned after losing a vote of confidence when he declared his intention to use Spiritualist means to research the authorship question. After a vacancy in 1946 Admiral Hubert Holland served (1946–1955), followed by Judge Christmas Humphreys. Under Humphreys, the group changed its name to "The Shakespearean Authorship Society" in 1959, later becoming "The Shakespearean Authorship Trust", the name it currently uses.

Oxfordian scholar and journalist Charles Wisner Barrell was secretary and treasurer of the group during the 1940s, and also was editor of two of the group's publications, the Shakespeare Fellowship Newsletter (1939–1943) and the Shakespeare Fellowship Quarterly (1944–1948).

After returning home to the United States, Barrell set up the American branch of the Shakespeare Fellowship. It was incorporated in 1945. Oxfordian author and attorney Charlton Greenwood Ogburn provided legal assistance in incorporating the organisation.

== Second Shakespeare Fellowship ==
In the United States, the organisation was superseded for many years by the Shakespeare Oxford Society, founded in 1957. In 2001 a new organisation entitled the "Shakespeare Fellowship" was created in the United States. The group asserted that "The Shakespeare Fellowship inherits the objectives framed by Sir George Greenwood, J. Thomas Looney, and the other founders of the first Shakespeare Fellowship, established in 1922." The Fellowship publishes a quarterly journal, Shakespeare Matters, maintains an active website, and sponsors an annual essay contest on the Shakespearean question. In April 2013 the Shakespeare Fellowship issued a notice of intent to merge with the Shakespeare Oxford Society under the new title "Shakespeare Oxford Fellowship". Following an overwhelming 74–4 vote for unification, the new "Shakespeare Oxford Fellowship" was created later in the year. John Hamill was appointed president of the merged organisation. The Shakespeare Fellowship publishes the annual journal The Oxfordian.
