= Shakespeare authorship question =

Fringe theories that Shakespeare's works were written by someone else

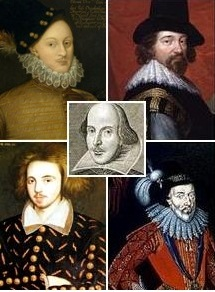
Oxford, Bacon, Derby, and Marlowe (clockwise from top left, Shakespeare centre) have each been proposed as the true author.

The Shakespeare authorship question is the argument that someone other than William Shakespeare of Stratford-upon-Avon wrote the works attributed to him. Anti-Stratfordians—a collective term for adherents of the various alternative-authorship theories—believe that Shakespeare of Stratford was a front to shield the identity of the real author or authors, who for some reason—usually social rank, state security, or gender—did not want or could not accept public credit. Although the idea has attracted much public interest, (Note: The UK and US editions of Shapiro 2010 differ significantly in pagination. The citations to the book used in this article list the UK page numbers first, followed by the page numbers of the US edition in parentheses.) all but a few Shakespeare scholars and literary historians consider it a fringe theory and for the most part acknowledge it only to rebut or disparage the claims.

Shakespeare's authorship was first questioned in the middle of the 19th century, when adulation of Shakespeare as the greatest writer of all time had become widespread. Some aspects of Shakespeare's life, particularly his humble origins and relative obscurity while he was alive, seemed incompatible with his poetic eminence and reputation for genius, which aroused suspicion that Shakespeare might not have written the works attributed to him. The controversy has since spawned a vast body of literature, and more than 80 authorship candidates have been proposed, the most popular being Sir Francis Bacon; Edward de Vere, 17th Earl of Oxford; Christopher Marlowe; and William Stanley, 6th Earl of Derby.

The arguments presented by anti-Stratfordians share several characteristics. They attempt to disqualify William Shakespeare as the author and usually offer supporting arguments for a substitute candidate. They often postulate some type of conspiracy that protected the author's true identity, which they say explains why no documentary evidence exists for their candidate and why the historical record supports Shakespeare's authorship. Supporters of alternative candidates argue that theirs is the more plausible author and that William Shakespeare lacked the education, aristocratic sensibility, or familiarity with the royal court that they say is evident in the works. Those Shakespeare scholars who have responded to such claims hold that biographical interpretations of literature are unreliable in attributing authorship and that the convergence of documentary evidence used to support Shakespeare's authorship—title pages, testimony by other contemporary poets and historians, and official records—is the same as that used for all other authorial attributions of his era. No such direct evidence exists for any other candidate, and Shakespeare's authorship was questioned neither during his lifetime nor for centuries after his death.

Despite the scholarly consensus, a small but highly visible and diverse assortment of supporters, including prominent public figures, have questioned the conventional attribution. They work for acknowledgement of the authorship question as a legitimate field of scholarly inquiry and for acceptance of one or another of the various authorship candidates.

== Case against Shakespeare's authorship ==
Most anti-Stratfordians suggest that the Shakespeare canon exhibits broad learning, knowledge of foreign languages and geography, and familiarity with Elizabethan and Jacobean court and politics; therefore, no one but a highly educated individual or court insider could have written it. Apart from literary references, critical commentary and acting notices, the available data regarding Shakespeare's life consist of mundane personal details such as vital records of his baptism, marriage and death, tax records, lawsuits to recover debts, and real estate transactions. In addition, no document attests that he received an education or owned any books. No personal letters or literary manuscripts certainly written by Shakespeare of Stratford survive. To sceptics, these gaps in the record suggest the profile of a person who differs markedly from the playwright and poet. Some prominent public figures, including Walt Whitman, Mark Twain, Helen Keller, Henry James, Sigmund Freud, John Paul Stevens, Prince Philip, Duke of Edinburgh and Charlie Chaplin, have found the arguments against Shakespeare's authorship persuasive, and their endorsements are an important element in many anti-Stratfordian arguments.At the core of the argument is the nature of acceptable evidence used to attribute works to their authors. Anti-Stratfordians rely on what has been called a "rhetoric of accumulation", or what they designate as circumstantial evidence: similarities between the characters and events portrayed in the works and the biography of their preferred candidate; literary parallels with the known works of their candidate; and literary and hidden allusions and cryptographic codes in works by contemporaries and in Shakespeare's own works.

Little is known of Shakespeare's personal life and education, and some anti-Stratfordians take this as circumstantial evidence against his authorship. Further, the lack of biographical information has sometimes been taken as an indication of an organised attempt by government officials to expunge all traces of Shakespeare, including perhaps his school records, to conceal the true author's identity.

=== Shakespeare's background ===
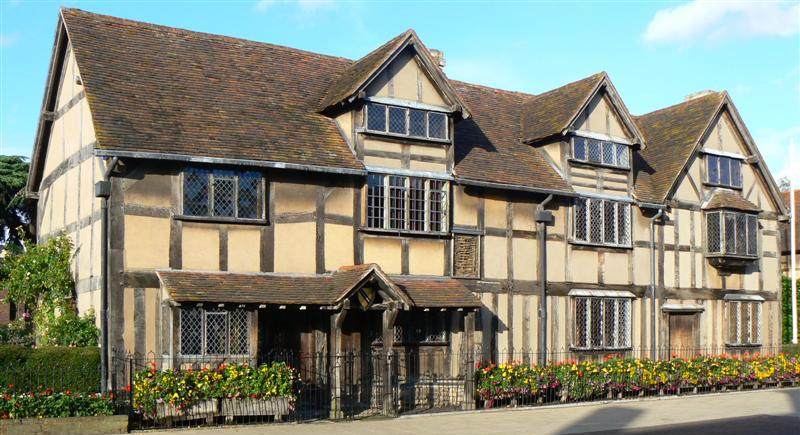
John Shakespeare's house in Stratford-upon-Avon is believed to be Shakespeare's birthplace.

Shakespeare was born, brought up, and buried in Stratford-upon-Avon, where he maintained a household throughout the duration of his career in London. A market town of around 1,500 residents about 100 miles (160 km) north-west of London, Stratford was a centre for the slaughter, marketing, and distribution of sheep, as well as for hide tanning and wool trading. Anti-Stratfordians often portray the town as a cultural backwater lacking the environment necessary to nurture a genius and depict Shakespeare as ignorant and illiterate.

Shakespeare's father, John Shakespeare, was a glover (glove-maker) and town official. He married Mary Arden, one of the Ardens of Warwickshire, a family of the local gentry. Both signed their names with a mark, and no other examples of their handwriting are extant. This is often used as an indication that Shakespeare was brought up in an illiterate household. There is also no evidence that Shakespeare's two daughters were literate, save for two signatures by Susanna that appear to be "drawn" instead of written with a practised hand. His other daughter, Judith, signed a legal document with a mark. Anti-Stratfordians consider these marks and the rudimentary signature style evidence of illiteracy and consider Shakespeare's plays, which "depict women across the social spectrum composing, reading, or delivering letters," evidence that the author came from a more educated background.

Anti-Stratfordians consider Shakespeare's background incompatible with that attributable to the author of the Shakespeare canon, which exhibits an intimacy with court politics and culture, foreign countries, and aristocratic sports such as hunting, falconry, tennis, and lawn-bowling. Some find that the works show little sympathy for upwardly mobile types such as John Shakespeare and his son and that the author portrays individual commoners comically, as objects of ridicule. Commoners in groups are said to be depicted typically as dangerous mobs.

=== Education and literacy ===
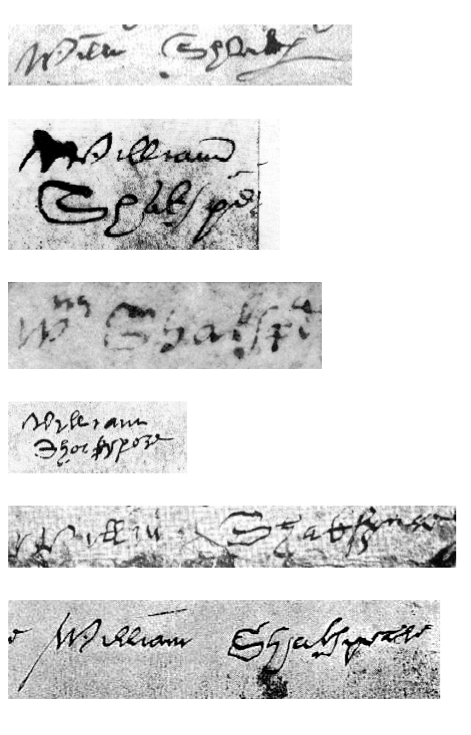
Shakespeare's six surviving signatures have often been cited as evidence of his illiteracy.

The absence of documentary proof of Shakespeare's education is often a part of anti-Stratfordian arguments. The free King's New School in Stratford, established 1553, was about half a mile (0.8 kilometres) from Shakespeare's boyhood home. Grammar schools varied in quality during the Elizabethan era, and there are no documents detailing what was taught at the Stratford school. However, grammar school curricula were largely similar, and the basic Latin text was standardised by royal decree. The school would have provided an intensive education in Latin grammar, the classics, and rhetoric at no cost. The headmaster, Thomas Jenkins, and the instructors were Oxford graduates. No student registers of the period survive, so no documentation exists for the attendance of Shakespeare or any other pupil, nor did anyone who taught or attended the school ever record that they were his teacher or classmate. This lack of documentation is taken by many anti-Stratfordians as evidence that Shakespeare had little or no education.

Anti-Stratfordians also question how Shakespeare, with no record of the education and cultured background displayed in the works bearing his name, could have acquired the extensive vocabulary found in the plays and poems. The author's vocabulary is calculated to be between 17,500 and 29,000 words. (Note: The low figure is that of Manfred Scheler. The upper figure, from Marvin Spevack, is true only if all word forms (cat and cats counted as two different words, for example), compound words, emendations, variants, proper names, foreign words, onomatopoeic words, and deliberate malapropisms are included.) No letters or signed manuscripts written by Shakespeare survive. The appearance of Shakespeare's six surviving authenticated signatures, which they characterise as "an illiterate scrawl", is interpreted as indicating that he was illiterate or barely literate. All are written in secretary hand, a style of handwriting common to the era, particularly in play writing, and three of them utilise breviographs to abbreviate the surname.

=== Name as a pseudonym ===
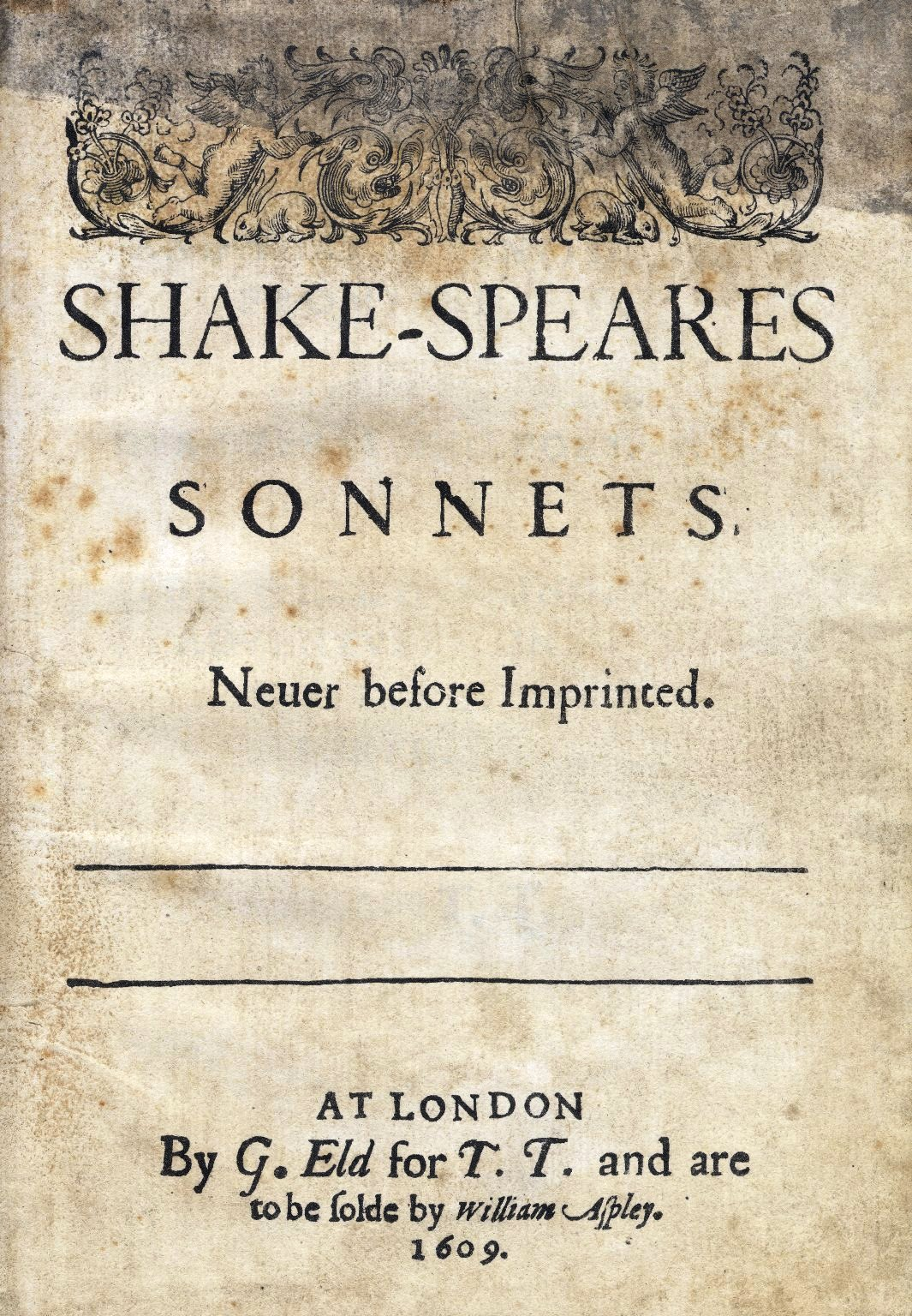
Shakespeare's name was hyphenated on the cover of the 1609 quarto edition of the Sonnets.

In his surviving signatures William Shakespeare did not spell his name as it appears on most Shakespeare title pages. His surname was spelled inconsistently in both literary and non-literary documents, with the most variation observed in those that were written by hand. This is taken as evidence that he was not the same person who wrote the works, and that the name was used as a pseudonym for the true author.

Shakespeare's surname was hyphenated as "Shake-speare" or "Shak-spear" on the title pages of 15 of the 32 individual quarto (or Q) editions of Shakespeare's plays and in two of the five editions of poetry published before the First Folio. Of those 15 title pages with Shakespeare's name hyphenated, 13 are on the title pages of just three plays, Richard II, Richard III, and Henry IV, Part 1. (Note: For Richard II, (Q2 (1598), Q3 (1598), Q4 (1608), and Q5 (1615). For Richard III, (Q2 (1598), Q3 (1602), Q4 (1605), Q5 (1612), and Q6 (1622). For Henry IV, Part 1, (Q2 (1599), Q3 (1604), Q4 (1608) and Q5 (1613)) The hyphen is also present in one cast list and in six literary allusions published between 1594 and 1623. This hyphen use is construed to indicate a pseudonym by most anti-Stratfordians, who argue that fictional descriptive names (such as "Master Shoe-tie" and "Sir Luckless Woo-all") were often hyphenated in plays, and pseudonyms such as "Tom Tell-truth" were also sometimes hyphenated.

Reasons proposed for the use of "Shakespeare" as a pseudonym vary, usually depending upon the social status of the candidate. Aristocrats such as Derby and Oxford supposedly used pseudonyms because of a prevailing "stigma of print", a social convention that putatively restricted their literary works to private and courtly audiences—as opposed to commercial endeavours—at the risk of social disgrace if violated. In the case of commoners, the reason was to avoid prosecution by the authorities: Bacon to avoid the consequences of advocating a more republican form of government, and Marlowe to avoid imprisonment or worse after faking his death and fleeing the country.

=== Lack of documentary evidence ===
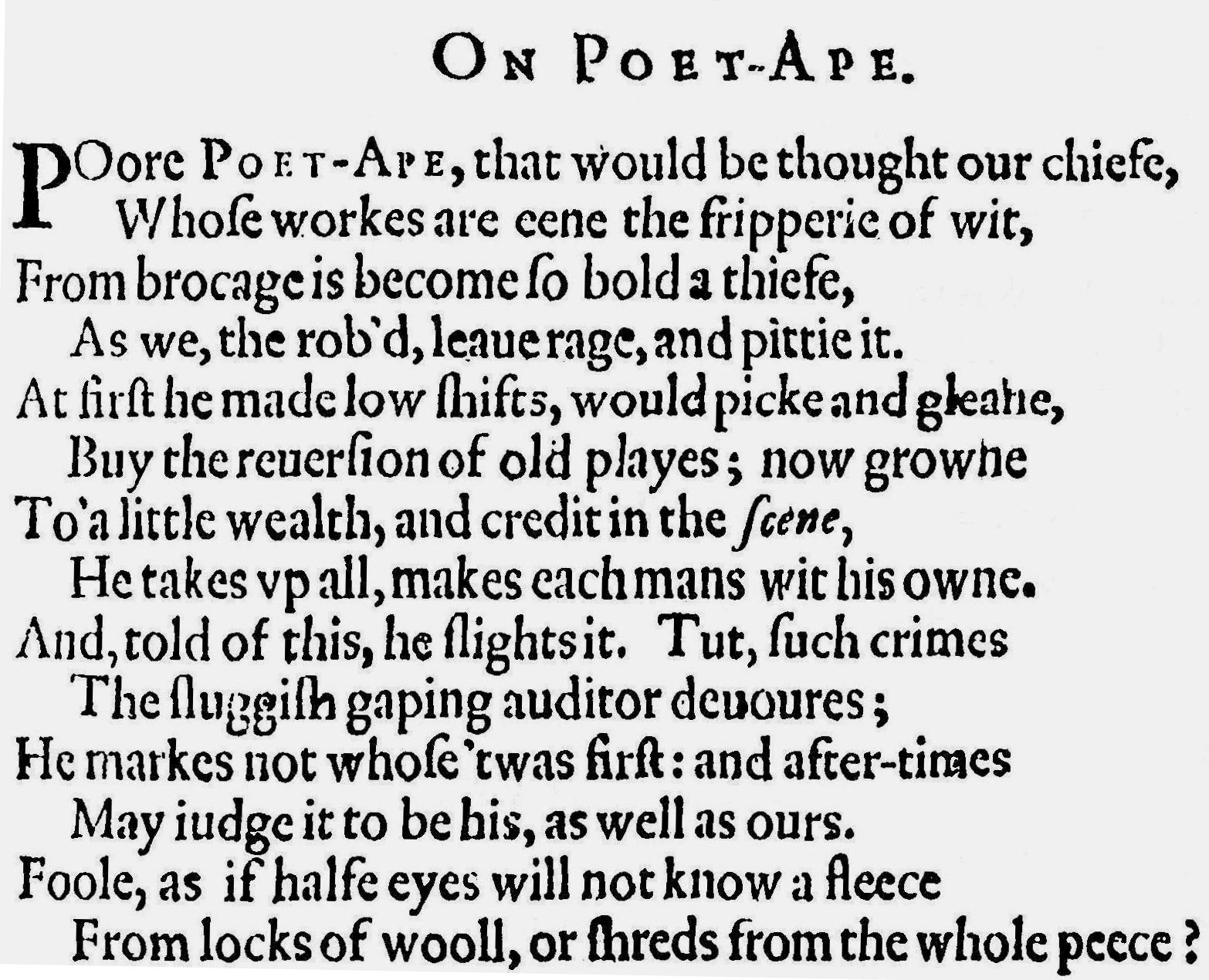
Ben Jonson's "On Poet-Ape" from his 1616 collected works is taken by some anti-Stratfordians to refer to Shakespeare.

Anti-Stratfordians say that nothing in the documentary record explicitly identifies Shakespeare as a writer; that the evidence instead supports a career as a businessman and real-estate investor; that any prominence he might have had in the London theatrical world (aside from his role as a front for the true author) was because of his money-lending, trading in theatrical properties, acting, and being a shareholder. They also believe that any evidence of a literary career was falsified as part of the effort to shield the true author's identity.

Alternative authorship theories generally reject the surface meaning of Elizabethan and Jacobean references to Shakespeare as a playwright. They interpret contemporary satirical characters as broad hints indicating that the London theatrical world knew Shakespeare was a front for an anonymous author. For instance, they identify Shakespeare with the literary thief Poet-Ape in Ben Jonson's poem of the same name, the socially ambitious fool Sogliardo in Jonson's Every Man Out of His Humour, and the foolish poetry-lover Gullio in the university play The Return from Parnassus (performed c. 1601). Similarly, praises of "Shakespeare" the writer, such as those found in the First Folio, are explained as references to the real author's pen-name, not the man from Stratford.

=== Circumstances of Shakespeare's death ===
Shakespeare died on 23 April 1616 in Stratford, leaving a signed will to direct the disposal of his large estate. The language of the will makes no mention of personal papers, books, poems, or the 18 plays that remained unpublished at the time of his death. In an interlineation, the will mentions monetary gifts to fellow actors for them to buy mourning rings.

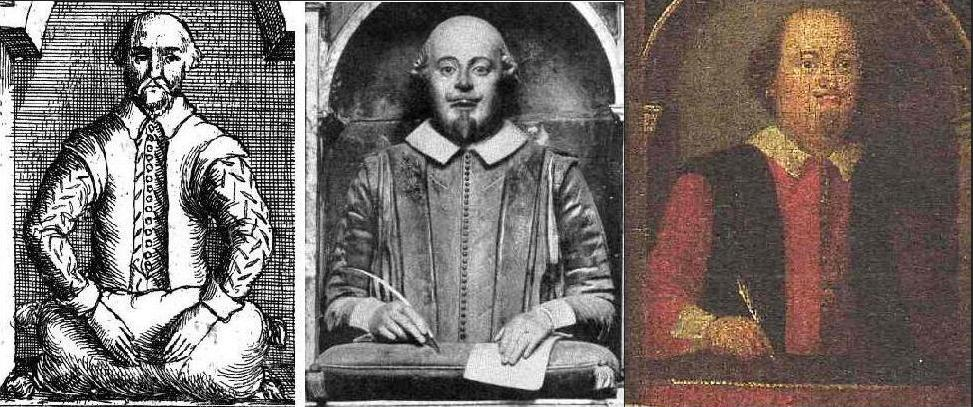
The effigy of Shakespeare's Stratford monument as it was portrayed by Dugdale in 1656, as it appears today, and as it was portrayed in 1748 before the restoration.

Any public mourning of Shakespeare's death went unrecorded, and no eulogies or poems memorialising his death were published until seven years later as part of the front matter in the First Folio of his plays.

Oxfordians think that the phrase "our ever-living Poet" (an epithet that commonly eulogised a deceased poet as having attained immortal literary fame), included in the dedication to Shakespeare's sonnets that were published in 1609, was a signal that the true poet had died by then. Oxford had died in 1604, five years earlier.

Shakespeare's funerary monument in Stratford consists of a demi-figure effigy of him with pen in hand and an attached plaque praising his abilities as a writer. The earliest printed image of the figure, in Sir William Dugdale's Antiquities of Warwickshire (1656), differs greatly from its present appearance. Some authorship theorists argue that the figure originally portrayed a man clutching a sack of grain or wool that was later altered to help conceal the identity of the true author. In an attempt to put to rest such speculation, in 1924 M. H. Spielmann published a painting of the monument that had been executed before the 1748 restoration, which showed it very similar to its present-day appearance. The publication of the image failed to achieve its intended effect, and in 2005 Oxfordian Richard Kennedy proposed that the monument was originally built to honour John Shakespeare, William's father, who by tradition was a "considerable dealer in wool".

== Case for Shakespeare's authorship ==
Nearly all academic Shakespeareans believe that the author referred to as "Shakespeare" was the same William Shakespeare who was born in Stratford-upon-Avon in 1564 and who died there in 1616. He became an actor and shareholder in the Lord Chamberlain's Men (later the King's Men), the playing company that owned the Globe Theatre, the Blackfriars Theatre, and exclusive rights to produce Shakespeare's plays from 1594 to 1642. Shakespeare was also allowed the use of the honorific "gentleman" after 1596 when his father was granted a coat of arms.

Academic Shakespeareans and literary historians rely mainly on direct documentary evidence—in the form of title page attributions and government records such as the Stationers' Register and the Accounts of the Revels Office—and contemporary testimony from poets, historians, and those players and playwrights who worked with him, as well as modern stylometric studies. Gaps in the record are explained by the low survival rate for documents of this period. Scholars say all these converge to confirm William Shakespeare's authorship. These criteria are the same as those used to credit works to other authors and are accepted as the standard methodology for authorship attribution.

Shakespeare scholars see no reason to suspect that the name was a pseudonym or that the actor was a front for the author: contemporary records identify Shakespeare as the writer, other playwrights such as Ben Jonson and Christopher Marlowe came from similar backgrounds, and no contemporary is known to have expressed doubts about Shakespeare's authorship. While information about some aspects of Shakespeare's life is sketchy, this is true of many other playwrights of the time. Of some, next to nothing is known. Others, such as Jonson, Marlowe, and John Marston, are more fully documented because of their education, close connections with the court, or brushes with the law. Literary scholars employ the same methodology to attribute works to the poet and playwright William Shakespeare as they use for other writers of the period: the historical record and stylistic studies, and they say the argument that there is no evidence of Shakespeare's authorship is a form of fallacious logic known as argumentum ex silentio, or argument from silence, because it takes the absence of evidence to be evidence of absence. They criticise the methods used to identify alternative candidates as unreliable and unscholarly, arguing that their subjectivity explains why at least 80 candidates have been proposed as the "true" author. They consider the idea that Shakespeare revealed himself autobiographically in his work to be a cultural anachronism: it has been a common authorial practice since the 19th century, but was not during the Elizabethan and Jacobean eras. Even in the 19th century, beginning at least with Hazlitt and Keats, critics frequently noted that the essence of Shakespeare's genius consisted in his ability to have his characters speak and act according to their given dramatic natures, rendering the determination of Shakespeare's authorial identity from his works that much more problematic.

=== Historical evidence ===
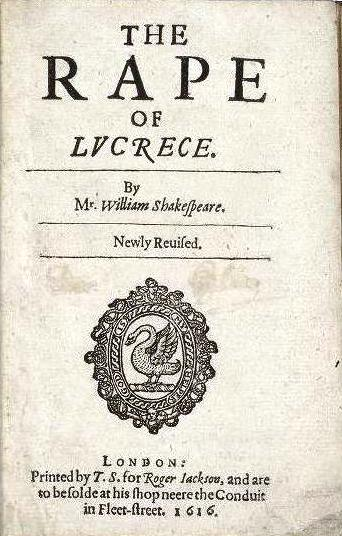
Shakespeare's honorific "Master" was represented as "Mr." on the title page of The Rape of Lucrece (O5, 1616).

The historical record is unequivocal in ascribing the authorship of the Shakespeare canon to a William Shakespeare. In addition to the name appearing on the title pages of poems and plays, this name was given as that of a well-known writer at least 23 times during the lifetime of William Shakespeare of Stratford. Several contemporaries corroborate the identity of the playwright as an actor, and explicit contemporary documentary evidence attests that the Stratford citizen was also an actor under his own name.

In 1598, Francis Meres named Shakespeare as a playwright and poet in his Palladis Tamia, referring to him as one of the authors by whom the "English tongue is mightily enriched". He names twelve plays written by Shakespeare, including four which were never published in quarto: The Two Gentlemen of Verona, The Comedy of Errors, Love's Labour's Won, and King John, as well as ascribing to Shakespeare some of the plays that were published anonymously before 1598—Titus Andronicus, Romeo and Juliet, and Henry IV, Part 1. He refers to Shakespeare's "sug[a]red Sonnets among his private friends" 11 years before the publication of the Sonnets.

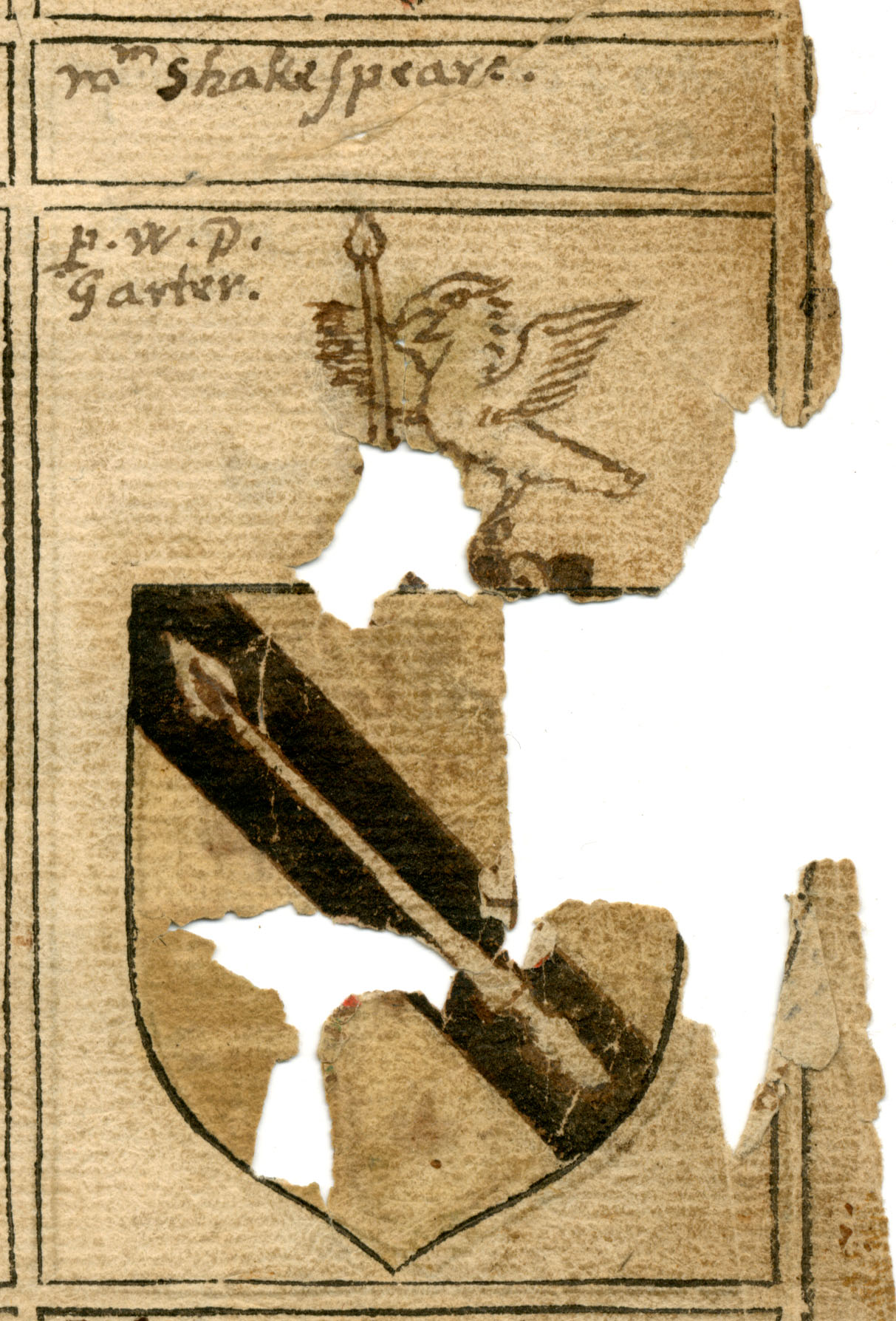
Shakespeare's father was granted a coat of arms in 1596, which in 1602 was unsuccessfully contested by Ralph Brooke, who identified Shakespeare as a "player" (actor) in his complaint.

In the rigid social structure of Elizabethan England, William Shakespeare was entitled to use the honorific "gentleman" after his father's death in 1601, since his father was granted a coat of arms in 1596. This honorific was conventionally designated by the title "Master" or its abbreviations "Mr." or "M." prefixed to the name (though it was often used by principal citizens and to imply respect to men of stature in the community without designating exact social status). The title was included in many contemporary references to Shakespeare, including official and literary records, and identifies William Shakespeare of Stratford as the same William Shakespeare designated as the author. Examples from Shakespeare's lifetime include two official stationers' entries. One is dated 23 August 1600 and entered by Andrew Wise and William Aspley:

Entred for their copies vnder the handes of the wardens. Twoo bookes. the one called: Muche a Doo about nothinge. Thother the second parte of the history of kinge henry the iiijth with the humors of Sr John ffalstaff: Wrytten by mr Shakespere. xij d

The other is dated 26 November 1607 and entered by Nathaniel Butter and John Busby:

Entred for their copie under thandes of Sr George Buck knight & Thwardens A booke called. Mr William Shakespeare his historye of Kynge Lear as yt was played before the kinges maiestie at Whitehall vppon St Stephans night at Christmas Last by his maiesties servantes playinge vsually at the globe on the Banksyde vj d

This latter appeared on the title page of King Lear Q1 (1608) as "M. William Shak-speare: HIS True Chronicle Historie of the life and death of King LEAR and his three Daughters."

Shakespeare's social status is also specifically referred to by his contemporaries in Epigram 159 by John Davies of Hereford in his The Scourge of Folly (1611): "To our English Terence Mr. Will: Shake-speare"; Epigram 92 by Thomas Freeman in his Runne and A Great Caste (1614): "To Master W: Shakespeare"; and in historian John Stow's list of "Our moderne, and present excellent Poets" in his Annales, printed posthumously in an edition by Edmund Howes (1615), which reads: "M. Willi. Shake-speare gentleman".

After Shakespeare's death, Ben Jonson explicitly identified William Shakespeare, gentleman, as the author in the title of his eulogy, "To the Memory of My Beloved the Author, Mr. William Shakespeare and What He Hath Left Us", published in the First Folio (1623). Other poets identified Shakespeare the gentleman as the author in the titles of their eulogies, also published in the First Folio: "Upon the Lines and Life of the Famous Scenic Poet, Master William Shakespeare" by Hugh Holland and "To the Memory of the Deceased Author, Master W. Shakespeare" by Leonard Digges.

=== Contemporary legal recognition ===
Both explicit testimony by his contemporaries and strong circumstantial evidence of personal relationships with those who interacted with him as an actor and playwright support Shakespeare's authorship.

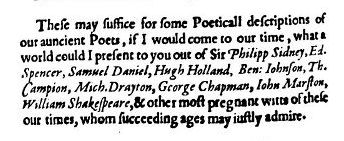
William Camden defended Shakespeare's right to bear heraldic arms about the same time he listed him as one of the great poets of his time.

The historian and antiquary Sir George Buc served as Deputy Master of the Revels from 1603 and as Master of the Revels from 1610 to 1622. His duties were to supervise and censor plays for the public theatres, arrange court performances of plays and, after 1606, to license plays for publication. Buc noted on the title page of George a Greene, the Pinner of Wakefield (1599), an anonymous play, that he had consulted Shakespeare on its authorship. Buc was meticulous in his efforts to attribute books and plays to the correct author, and in 1607 he personally licensed King Lear for publication as written by "Master William Shakespeare".

In 1602, Ralph Brooke, the York Herald, accused Sir William Dethick, the Garter King of Arms, of elevating 23 unworthy persons to the gentry. One of these was Shakespeare's father, who had applied for arms 34 years earlier but had to wait for the success of his son before they were granted in 1596. Brooke included a sketch of the Shakespeare arms, captioned "Shakespear ye Player by Garter". The grants, including John Shakespeare's, were defended by Dethick and Clarenceux King of Arms William Camden, the foremost antiquary of the time. In his Remaines Concerning Britaine—published in 1605, but finished two years previously and before the Earl of Oxford died in 1604—Camden names Shakespeare as one of the "most pregnant witts of these ages our times, whom succeeding ages may justly admire".

=== Recognition by fellow actors, playwrights and writers ===
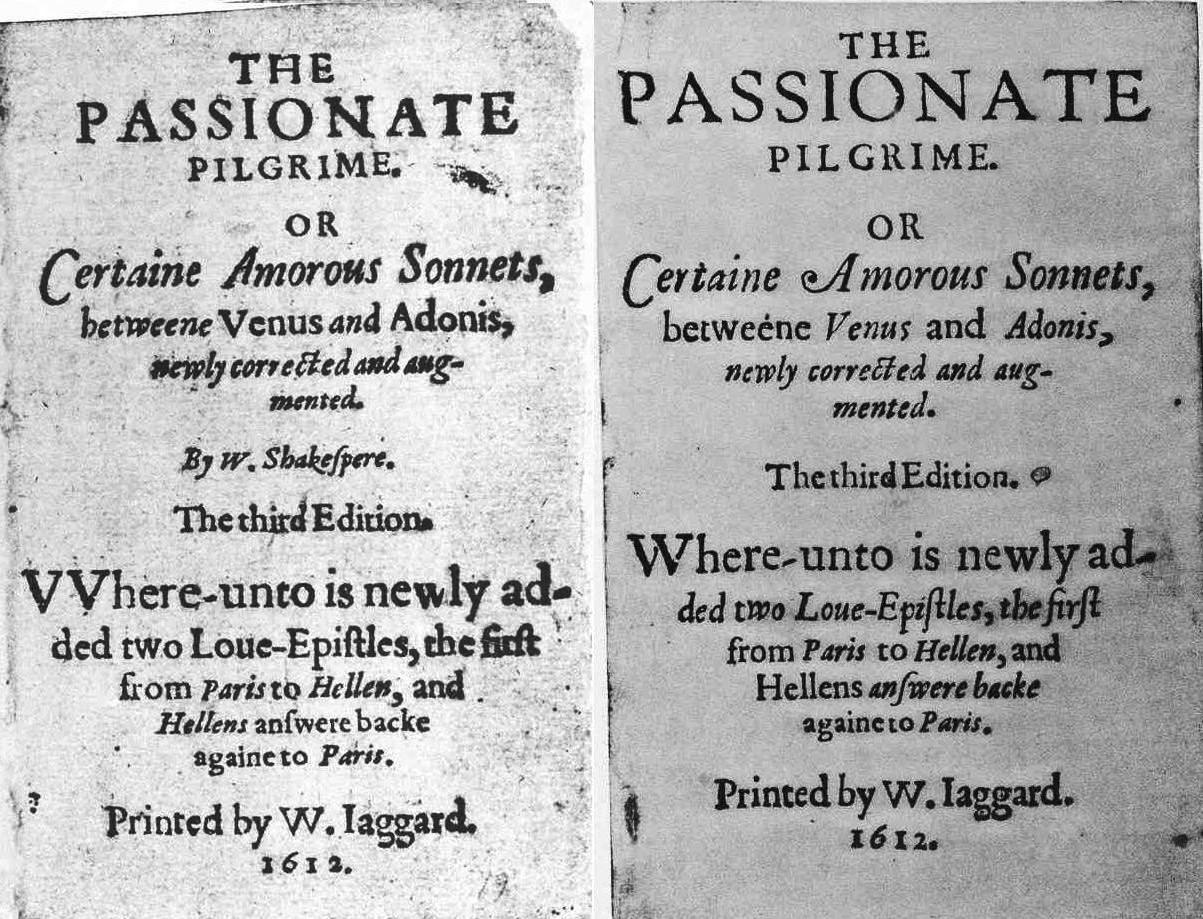
The two versions of the title page of The Passionate Pilgrim (3rd ed., 1612)

Actors John Heminges and Henry Condell knew and worked with Shakespeare for more than 20 years. In the 1623 First Folio, they wrote that they had published the Folio "onely to keepe the memory of so worthy a Friend, & Fellow aliue, as was our Shakespeare, by humble offer of his playes". The playwright and poet Ben Jonson knew Shakespeare from at least 1598, when the Lord Chamberlain's Men performed Jonson's play Every Man in His Humour at the Curtain Theatre with Shakespeare as a cast member. The Scottish poet William Drummond recorded Jonson's often contentious comments about his contemporaries: Jonson criticised Shakespeare as lacking "arte" and for mistakenly giving Bohemia a coast in The Winter's Tale. In 1641, four years after Jonson's death, private notes written during his later life were published. In a comment intended for posterity (Timber or Discoveries), he criticises Shakespeare's casual approach to playwriting, but praises Shakespeare as a person: "I loved the man, and do honour his memory (on this side Idolatry) as much as any. He was (indeed) honest, and of an open, and free nature; had an excellent fancy; brave notions, and gentle expressions ..."

In addition to Ben Jonson, other playwrights wrote about Shakespeare, including some who sold plays to Shakespeare's company. Two of the three Parnassus plays produced at St John's College, Cambridge, near the beginning of the 17th century mention Shakespeare as an actor, poet, and playwright who lacked a university education. In The First Part of the Return from Parnassus, two separate characters refer to Shakespeare as "Sweet Mr. Shakespeare", and in The Second Part of the Return from Parnassus (1606), the anonymous playwright has the actor Kempe say to the actor Burbage, "Few of the university men pen plays well ... Why here's our fellow Shakespeare puts them all down."

An edition of The Passionate Pilgrim, expanded with an additional nine poems written by the prominent English actor, playwright, and author Thomas Heywood, was published by William Jaggard in 1612 with Shakespeare's name on the title page. Heywood protested this piracy in his Apology for Actors (1612), adding that the author was "much offended with M. Jaggard (that altogether unknown to him) presumed to make so bold with his name." That Heywood stated with certainty that the author was unaware of the deception and that Jaggard removed Shakespeare's name from unsold copies even though Heywood did not explicitly name him indicate that Shakespeare was the offended author. Elsewhere, in his poem "Hierarchie of the Blessed Angels" (1634), Heywood affectionately notes the nicknames his fellow playwrights had been known by. Of Shakespeare, he writes:

Our modern poets to that pass are driven,
Those names are curtailed which they first had given;
And, as we wished to have their memories drowned,
We scarcely can afford them half their sound. ...
Mellifluous Shake-speare, whose enchanting quill
Commanded mirth or passion, was but Will.

Playwright John Webster, in his dedication to The White Devil (1612), wrote, "And lastly (without wrong last to be named), the right happy and copious industry of M. Shake-Speare, M. Decker, & M. Heywood, wishing what I write might be read in their light", here using the abbreviation "M." to denote "Master", a form of address properly used of William Shakespeare of Stratford, who was titled a gentleman.

In a verse letter to Ben Jonson dated to about 1608, Francis Beaumont alludes to several playwrights, including Shakespeare, about whom he wrote,

... Here I would let slip
(If I had any in me) scholarship,
And from all learning keep these lines as clear
as Shakespeare's best are, which our heirs shall hear
Preachers apt to their auditors to show
how far sometimes a mortal man may go
by the dim light of Nature.

=== Historical perspective of Shakespeare's death ===
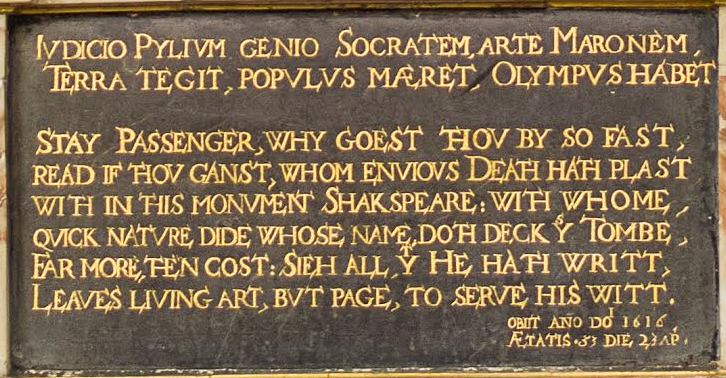
The inscription on Shakespeare's monument

The monument to Shakespeare, erected in Stratford before 1623, bears a plaque with an inscription identifying Shakespeare as a writer. The first two Latin lines translate to "In judgment a Pylian, in genius a Socrates, in art a Maro, the earth covers him, the people mourn him, Olympus possesses him", referring to Nestor, Socrates, Virgil, and Mount Olympus. The monument was not only referred to in the First Folio, but other early 17th-century records identify it as being a memorial to Shakespeare and transcribe the inscription. Sir William Dugdale also included the inscription in his Antiquities of Warwickshire (1656), but the engraving was done from a sketch made in 1634 and, like other portrayals of monuments in his work, is not accurate.

Shakespeare's will, executed on 25 March 1616, bequeaths "to my fellows John Hemynge Richard Burbage and Henry Cundell 26 shilling 8 pence apiece to buy them [mourning] rings". Numerous public records, including the royal patent of 19 May 1603 that chartered the King's Men, establish that Phillips, Heminges, Burbage, and Condell were fellow actors in the King's Men with William Shakespeare; two of them later edited his collected plays. Anti-Stratfordians have cast suspicion on these bequests, which were interlined, and claim that they were added later as part of a conspiracy. However, the will was proved in the Prerogative Court of the Archbishop of Canterbury (George Abbot) in London on 22 June 1616, and the original was copied into the court register with the bequests intact.

John Taylor was the first poet to mention in print the deaths of Shakespeare and Francis Beaumont in his 1620 book of poems The Praise of Hemp-seed. Both had died four years earlier, less than two months apart. Ben Jonson wrote a short poem "To the Reader" commending the First Folio engraving of Shakespeare by Droeshout as a good likeness. Included in the prefatory commendatory verses was Jonson's lengthy eulogy "To the memory of my beloved, the Author Mr. William Shakespeare: and what he hath left us" in which he identifies Shakespeare as a playwright, a poet, and an actor, and writes:

Sweet Swan of Avon! what a sight it were
To see thee in our waters yet appear,
And make those flights upon the banks of Thames,
That so did take Eliza, and our James!

Here Jonson links the author to Stratford's river, the Avon, and confirms his appearances at the courts of Elizabeth I and James I.

Leonard Digges wrote the elegy "To the Memorie of the Deceased Authour Maister W. Shakespeare" in the 1623 First Folio, referring to "thy Stratford Moniment". Living four miles from Stratford-upon-Avon from 1600 until attending Oxford in 1603, Digges was the stepson of Thomas Russell, whom Shakespeare in his will designated as overseer to the executors. William Basse wrote an elegy entitled "On Mr. Wm. Shakespeare" sometime between 1616 and 1623, in which he suggests that Shakespeare should have been buried in Westminster Abbey next to Chaucer, Beaumont, and Spenser. This poem circulated very widely in manuscript and survives today in more than two dozen contemporary copies; several of these have a fuller, variant title "On Mr. William Shakespeare, he died in April 1616", which unambiguously specifies that the reference is to Shakespeare of Stratford.

=== Evidence for Shakespeare's authorship from his works ===
Shakespeare's are the most studied secular works in history. Contemporary comments and some textual studies support the authorship of someone with an education, background, and life span consistent with that of William Shakespeare.

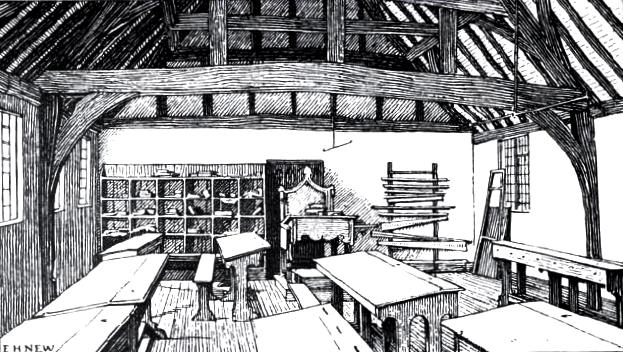
The King Edward VI Grammar School at Stratford-upon-Avon

Ben Jonson and Francis Beaumont referenced Shakespeare's lack of classical learning, and no extant contemporary record suggests he was a learned writer or scholar. This is consistent with classical blunders in Shakespeare, such as mistaking the scansion of many classical names, or the anachronistic citing of Plato and Aristotle in Troilus and Cressida. It has been suggested that most of Shakespeare's classical allusions were drawn from Thomas Cooper's Thesaurus Linguae Romanae et Britannicae (1565), since a number of errors in that work are replicated in several of Shakespeare's plays, and a copy of this book had been bequeathed to Stratford Grammar School by John Bretchgirdle for "the common use of scholars".

Later critics such as Samuel Johnson remarked that Shakespeare's genius lay not in his erudition, but in his "vigilance of observation and accuracy of distinction which books and precepts cannot confer; from this almost all original and native excellence proceeds". Much of the learning with which he has been credited and the omnivorous reading imputed to Shakespeare by critics in later years is exaggerated, and he may well have absorbed much learning from conversations. And contrary to previous claims—both scholarly and popular—about his vocabulary and word coinage, the evidence of vocabulary size and word-use frequency places Shakespeare with his contemporaries, rather than apart from them. Computerized comparisons with other playwrights demonstrate that his vocabulary is indeed large, but only because the canon of his surviving plays is larger than those of his contemporaries and because of the broad range of his characters, settings, and themes.

Shakespeare's plays differ from those of the University Wits in that they avoid ostentatious displays of the writer's mastery of Latin or of classical principles of drama, with the exceptions of co-authored early plays such as the Henry VI series and Titus Andronicus. His classical allusions instead rely on the Elizabethan grammar school curriculum. The curriculum began with William Lily's Latin grammar Rudimenta Grammatices and progressed to Caesar, Livy, Virgil, Horace, Ovid, Plautus, Terence, and Seneca, all of whom are quoted and echoed in the Shakespearean canon. Almost uniquely among his peers, Shakespeare's plays include references to grammar school texts and pedagogy, together with caricatures of schoolmasters. Titus Andronicus (4.10), The Taming of the Shrew (1.1), Love's Labour's Lost (5.1), Twelfth Night (2.3), and The Merry Wives of Windsor (4.1) refer to Lily's Grammar. Shakespeare also alluded to the petty school that children attended at age 5 to 7 to learn to read, a prerequisite for grammar school.

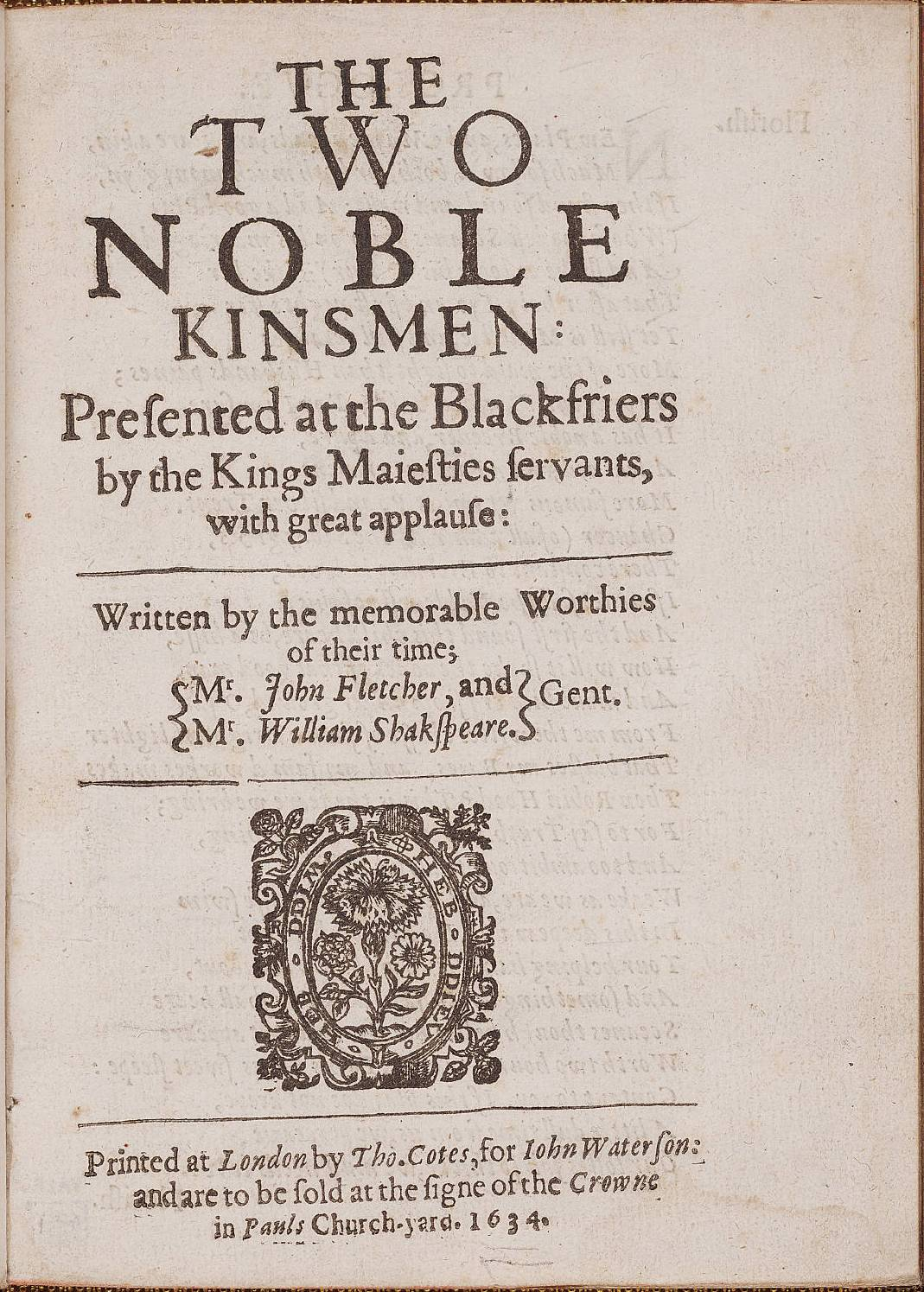
Title page of the 1634 quarto of The Two Noble Kinsmen by John Fletcher and Shakespeare

Beginning in 1987, Ward Elliott, who was sympathetic to the Oxfordian theory, and Robert J. Valenza supervised a continuing stylometric study that used computer programs to compare Shakespeare's stylistic habits to the works of 37 authors who had been proposed as the true author. The study, known as the Claremont Shakespeare Clinic, was last held in the spring of 2010. The tests determined that Shakespeare's work shows consistent, countable, profile-fitting patterns, suggesting that he was a single individual, not a committee, and that he used fewer relative clauses and more hyphens, feminine endings, and run-on lines than most of the writers with whom he was compared. The result determined that none of the other tested claimants' work could have been written by Shakespeare, nor could Shakespeare have been written by them, eliminating all of the claimants whose known works have survived—including Oxford, Bacon, and Marlowe—as the true authors of the Shakespeare canon.

Shakespeare's style evolved over time in keeping with changes in literary trends. His late plays, such as The Winter's Tale, The Tempest, and Henry VIII, are written in a style similar to that of other Jacobean playwrights and radically different from that of his Elizabethan-era plays. In addition, after the King's Men began using the Blackfriars Theatre for performances in 1609, Shakespeare's plays were written to accommodate a smaller stage with more music, dancing, and more evenly divided acts to allow for trimming the candles used for stage lighting.

In a 2004 study, Dean Keith Simonton examined the correlation between the thematic content of Shakespeare's plays and the political context in which they would have been written. He concludes that the consensus play chronology is roughly the correct order, and that Shakespeare's works exhibit gradual stylistic development consistent with that of other artistic geniuses. When backdated two years, the mainstream chronologies yield substantial correlations between the two, whereas the alternative chronologies proposed by Oxfordians display no relationship regardless of the time lag.

Textual evidence from the late plays indicates that Shakespeare collaborated with other playwrights who were not always aware of what he had done in a previous scene. This suggests that they were following a rough outline rather than working from an unfinished script left by an already dead playwright, as some Oxfordians propose. For example, in The Two Noble Kinsmen (1612–1613), written with John Fletcher, Shakespeare has two characters meet and leaves them on stage at the end of one scene, yet Fletcher has them act as if they were meeting for the first time in the following scene.

== History of the authorship question ==
=== Bardolatry and early doubt ===
Despite adulatory tributes attached to his works, Shakespeare was not considered the world's greatest writer in the century and a half following his death. His reputation was that of a good playwright and poet among many others of his era. Beaumont and Fletcher's plays dominated popular taste after the theatres reopened in the Restoration Era in 1660, with Ben Jonson's and Shakespeare's plays vying for second place. After the actor David Garrick mounted the Shakespeare Stratford Jubilee in 1769, Shakespeare led the field. Excluding a handful of minor 18th-century satirical and allegorical references, there was no suggestion in this period that anyone else might have written the works. The authorship question emerged only after Shakespeare had come to be regarded as the English national poet and a unique genius.

By the beginning of the 19th century, adulation was in full swing, with Shakespeare singled out as a transcendent genius, a phenomenon for which George Bernard Shaw coined the term "bardolatry" in 1901. By the middle of the century his genius was noted as much for its intellectual as for its imaginative strength. The framework with which early 19th century thinkers imagined the English Renaissance focused on kings, courtiers, and university-educated poets; in this context, the idea that someone of Shakespeare's comparatively humble background could produce such works became increasingly unacceptable. Although still convinced that Shakespeare was the author of the works, Ralph Waldo Emerson expressed this disjunction in a lecture in 1846 by allowing that he could not reconcile Shakespeare's verse with the image of a jovial actor and theatre manager. The rise of historical criticism, which challenged the authorial unity of Homer's epics and the historicity of the Bible, also fuelled emerging puzzlement over Shakespeare's authorship, which in one critic's view was "an accident waiting to happen". David Strauss's investigation of the biography of Jesus, which shocked the public with its scepticism of the historical accuracy of the Gospels, influenced the secular debate about Shakespeare. In 1848, Samuel Mosheim Schmucker endeavoured to rebut Strauss's doubts about the historicity of Christ by applying the same techniques satirically to the records of Shakespeare's life in his Historic Doubts Respecting Shakespeare, Illustrating Infidel Objections Against the Bible. Schmucker, who never doubted that Shakespeare was Shakespeare, unwittingly anticipated and rehearsed many of the arguments later offered for alternative authorship candidates.

=== Open dissent and the first alternative candidate ===
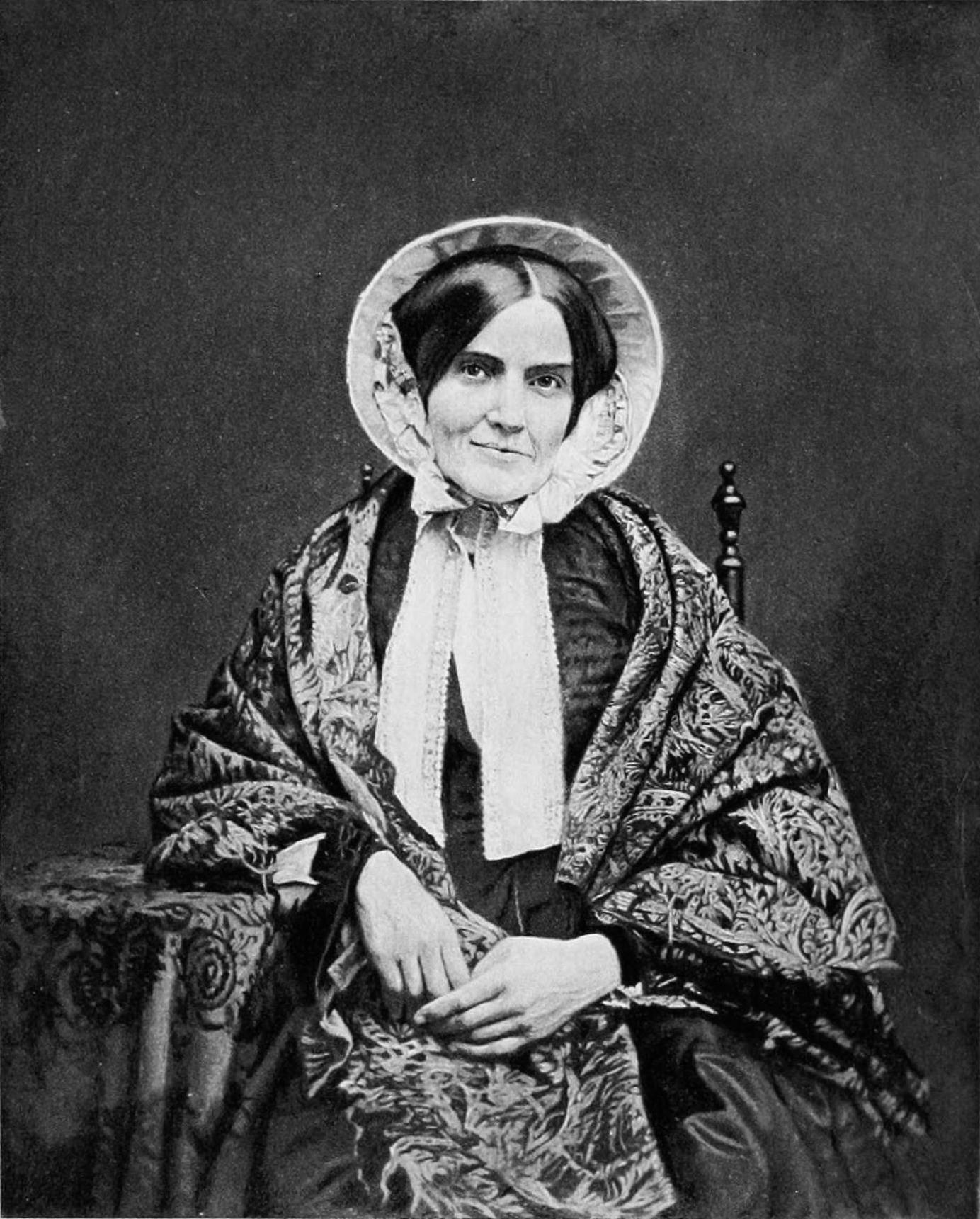
Delia Bacon was the first writer to formulate a comprehensive theory that Shakespeare was not the writer of the works attributed to him.

Shakespeare's authorship was first openly questioned in the pages of Joseph C. Hart's The Romance of Yachting (1848). Hart argued that the plays contained evidence that many different authors had worked on them. Four years later Dr. Robert W. Jameson anonymously published "Who Wrote Shakespeare?" in the Chambers's Edinburgh Journal, expressing similar views. In 1856 Delia Bacon's unsigned article "William Shakspeare and His Plays; An Enquiry Concerning Them" appeared in Putnam's Magazine.

As early as 1845, Ohio-born Delia Bacon had theorised that the plays attributed to Shakespeare were actually written by a group under the leadership of Sir Francis Bacon (no relation), with Walter Raleigh as the main writer. Their purpose was to inculcate an advanced political and philosophical system for which they themselves could not publicly assume responsibility. She argued that Shakespeare's commercial success precluded his writing plays so concerned with philosophical and political issues, and that if he had, he would have overseen the publication of his plays in his retirement.

Francis Bacon was the first single alternative author proposed in print, by William Henry Smith, in a pamphlet published in September 1856 (Was Lord Bacon the Author of Shakspeare's Plays? A Letter to Lord Ellesmere). The following year Delia Bacon published a book outlining her theory: The Philosophy of the Plays of Shakspere Unfolded. Ten years later, Nathaniel Holmes published the 600-page The Authorship of Shakespeare supporting Smith's theory, and the idea began to spread widely. By 1884 the question had produced more than 250 books, and Smith asserted that the war against the Shakespeare hegemony had almost been won by the Baconians after a 30-year battle. Two years later the Francis Bacon Society was founded in England to promote the theory. The society still survives and publishes a journal, Baconiana, to further its mission.

These arguments against Shakespeare's authorship were answered by academics. In 1857 the English critic George Henry Townsend published William Shakespeare Not an Impostor, criticising what he called the slovenly scholarship, false premises, specious parallel passages, and erroneous conclusions of the earliest proponents of alternative authorship candidates.

=== Search for proof ===
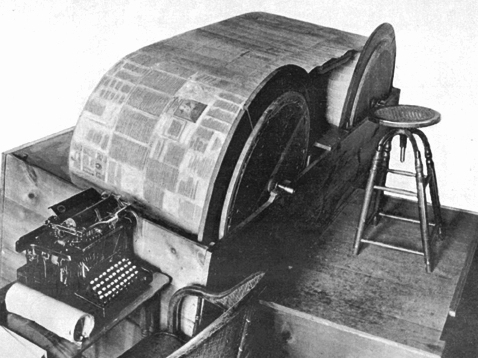
Orville Ward Owen constructed a "cipher wheel" that he used to search for hidden ciphers he believed Francis Bacon had left in Shakespeare's works.

In 1853, with the help of Ralph Waldo Emerson, Delia Bacon travelled to England to search for evidence to support her theories. Instead of performing archival research, she sought to unearth buried manuscripts, and unsuccessfully tried to persuade a caretaker to open Bacon's tomb. She believed she had deciphered instructions in Bacon's letters to look beneath Shakespeare's Stratford gravestone for papers that would prove the works were Bacon's, but after spending several nights in the chancel trying to summon the requisite courage, she left without prising up the stone slab.

Ciphers became important to the Baconian theory, as they would later to the advocacy of other authorship candidates, with books such as Ignatius L. Donnelly's The Great Cryptogram (1888) promoting the approach. Dr. Orville Ward Owen constructed a "cipher wheel", a 1,000-foot strip of canvas on which he had pasted the works of Shakespeare and other writers and mounted on two parallel wheels so he could quickly collate pages with key words as he turned them for decryption. In his multi-volume Sir Francis Bacon's Cipher Story (1893), he claimed to have discovered Bacon's autobiography embedded in Shakespeare's plays, including the revelation that Bacon was the secret son of Queen Elizabeth, thus providing more motivation to conceal his authorship from the public.

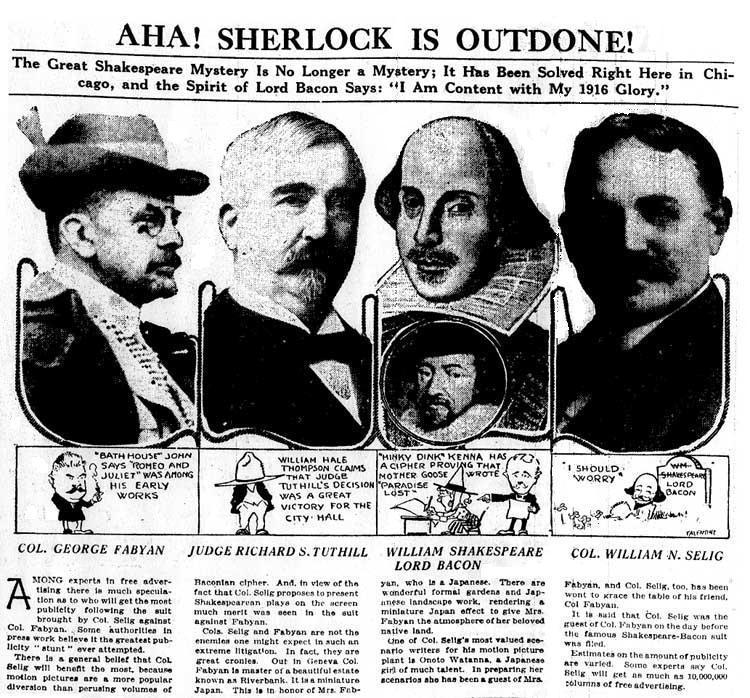
A feature in the Chicago Tribune on the 1916 trial of Shakespeare's authorship. From left: George Fabyan; Judge Tuthill; Shakespeare and Bacon; William Selig.

Perhaps because of Francis Bacon's legal background, both mock and real jury trials figured in attempts to prove claims for Bacon, and later for Oxford. The first mock trial was conducted over 15 months in 1892–93, and the results of the debate were published in the Boston monthly The Arena. Ignatius Donnelly was one of the plaintiffs, while F. J. Furnivall formed part of the defence. The 25-member jury, which included Henry George, Edmund Gosse, and Henry Irving, came down heavily in favour of William Shakespeare. In 1916, Judge Richard Tuthill presided over a real trial in Chicago. A film producer brought an action against a Baconian advocate, George Fabyan. He argued that Fabyan's advocacy of Bacon threatened the profits expected from a forthcoming film about Shakespeare. The judge determined that ciphers identified by Fabyan's analysts proved that Francis Bacon was the author of the Shakespeare canon, awarding Fabyan $5,000 in damages. In the ensuing uproar, Tuthill rescinded his decision, and another judge, Frederick A. Smith, dismissed the case.

In 1907, Owen claimed he had decoded instructions revealing that a box containing proof of Bacon's authorship had been buried in the River Wye near Chepstow Castle on the Duke of Beaufort's property. His dredging machinery failed to retrieve any concealed manuscripts. That same year his former assistant, Elizabeth Wells Gallup, financed by George Fabyan, likewise travelled to England. She believed she had decoded a message, by means of a biliteral cipher, revealing that Bacon's secret manuscripts were hidden behind panels in Canonbury Tower in Islington. None were found. Two years later, the American humorist Mark Twain publicly revealed his long-held anti-Stratfordian belief in Is Shakespeare Dead? (1909), favouring Bacon as the true author.

In the 1920s Walter Conrad Arensberg became convinced that Bacon had willed the key to his cipher to the Rosicrucians. He thought this society was still active, and that its members communicated with each under the aegis of the Church of England. On the basis of cryptograms he detected in the sixpenny tickets of admission to Holy Trinity Church in Stratford-upon-Avon, he deduced that both Bacon and his mother were secretly buried, together with the original manuscripts of Shakespeare's plays, in the Lichfield Chapter house in Staffordshire. He unsuccessfully petitioned the Dean of Lichfield to allow him both to photograph and excavate the obscure grave. Maria Bauer was convinced that Bacon's manuscripts had been imported into Jamestown, Virginia, in 1653, and could be found in the Bruton Vault at Williamsburg. She gained permission in the late 1930s to excavate, but authorities quickly withdrew her permit. In 1938 Roderick Eagle was allowed to open the tomb of Edmund Spenser to search for proof that Bacon was Shakespeare, but found only some old bones.

=== Other candidates emerge ===
By the end of the 19th century other candidates had begun to receive attention. In 1895 Wilbur G. Zeigler, an attorney, published the novel It Was Marlowe: A Story of the Secret of Three Centuries, whose premise was that Christopher Marlowe did not die in 1593, but rather survived to write Shakespeare's plays. He was followed by Thomas Corwin Mendenhall who, in the February 1902 issue of Current Literature, wrote an article based upon his stylometric work titled "Did Marlowe write Shakespeare?" Karl Bleibtreu, a German literary critic, advanced the nomination of Roger Manners, 5th Earl of Rutland, in 1907. Rutland's candidacy enjoyed a brief flowering, supported by a number of other authors over the next few years. Anti-Stratfordians unaffiliated to any specific authorship candidate also began to appear. George Greenwood, a British barrister, sought to disqualify William Shakespeare from the authorship in The Shakespeare Problem Restated (1908) but did not support any alternative authors, thereby encouraging the search for candidates other than Bacon. John M. Robertson published The Baconian Heresy: A Confutation in 1913, refuting the contention that Shakespeare had expert legal knowledge by showing that legalisms pervaded Elizabethan and Jacobean literature. In 1916, on the three-hundredth anniversary of Shakespeare's death, Henry Watterson, the long-time editor of The Courier-Journal, wrote a widely syndicated front-page feature story supporting the Marlovian theory and, like Zeigler, created a fictional account of how it might have happened. After the First World War, Professor Abel Lefranc, an authority on French and English literature, argued the case for William Stanley, 6th Earl of Derby, as the author based on biographical evidence he had gleaned from the plays and poems.

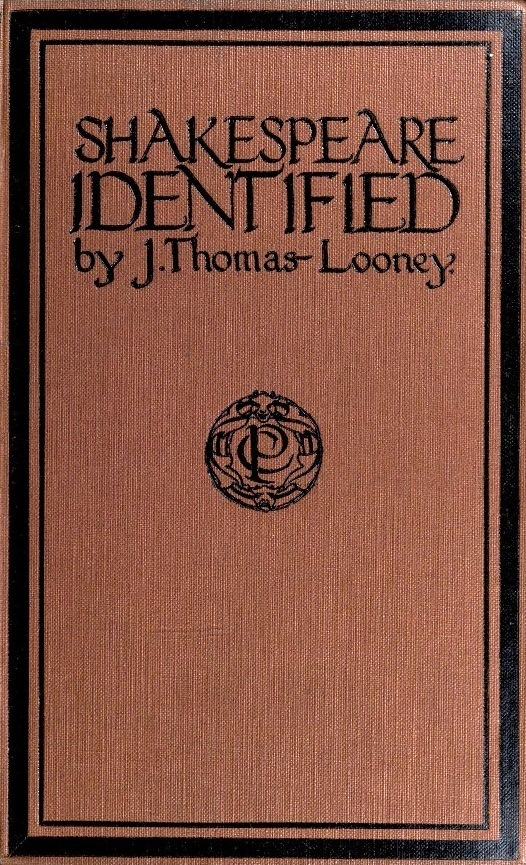
J. Thomas Looney's Shakespeare Identified (1920) made Edward de Vere, 17th Earl of Oxford, the top authorship claimant.

With the appearance of J. Thomas Looney's Shakespeare Identified (1920), Edward de Vere, 17th Earl of Oxford, quickly ascended as the most popular alternative author. Two years later Looney and Greenwood founded the Shakespeare Fellowship, an international organisation to promote discussion and debate on the authorship question, which later changed its mission to propagate the Oxfordian theory. In 1923 Archie Webster published "Was Marlowe the Man?" in The National Review, like Zeigler, Mendenhall and Watterson proposing that Marlowe wrote the works of Shakespeare, and arguing in particular that the Sonnets were an autobiographical account of his survival. In 1932 Allardyce Nicoll announced the discovery of a manuscript that appeared to establish James Wilmot as the earliest proponent of Bacon's authorship, but recent investigations have identified the manuscript as a forgery probably designed to revive Baconian theory in the face of Oxford's ascendancy.

Another authorship candidate emerged in 1943 when writer Alden Brooks, in his Will Shakspere and the Dyer's hand, argued for Sir Edward Dyer. Six years earlier Brooks had dismissed Shakespeare as the playwright by proposing that his role in the deception was to act as an Elizabethan "play broker", brokering the plays and poems on behalf of his various principals, the real authors. This view, of Shakespeare as a commercial go-between, was later adapted by Oxfordians. After the Second World War, Oxfordism and anti-Stratfordism declined in popularity and visibility. Copious archival research had failed to confirm Oxford or anyone else as the true author, and publishers lost interest in books advancing the same theories based on alleged circumstantial evidence. To bridge the evidentiary gap, both Oxfordians and Baconians began to argue that hidden clues and allusions in the Shakespeare canon had been placed there by their candidate for the benefit of future researchers.

To revive interest in Oxford, in 1952 Dorothy and Charlton Ogburn Sr. published the 1,300-page This Star of England, now regarded as a classic Oxfordian text. They proposed that the "fair youth" of the sonnets was Henry Wriothesley, 3rd Earl of Southampton, the offspring of a love affair between Oxford and the Queen, and that the "Shakespeare" plays were written by Oxford to memorialise the passion of that affair. This became known as the "Prince Tudor theory", which postulates that the Queen's illicit offspring and his father's authorship of the Shakespeare canon were covered up as an Elizabethan state secret. The Ogburns found many parallels between Oxford's life and the works, particularly in Hamlet, which they characterised as "straight biography". A brief upsurge of enthusiasm ensued, resulting in the establishment of the Shakespeare Oxford Society in the US in 1957.

In 1955 Broadway press agent Calvin Hoffman revived the Marlovian theory with the publication of The Murder of the Man Who Was "Shakespeare". The next year he went to England to search for documentary evidence about Marlowe that he thought might be buried in his literary patron Sir Thomas Walsingham's tomb. Nothing was found.

A series of critical academic books and articles held in check any appreciable growth of anti-Stratfordism, as academics attacked its results and its methodology as unscholarly. American cryptologists William and Elizebeth Friedman won the Folger Shakespeare Library Literary Prize in 1955 for a study of the arguments that the works of Shakespeare contain hidden ciphers. The study disproved all claims that the works contain ciphers, and was condensed and published as The Shakespearean Ciphers Examined (1957). Soon after, four major works were issued surveying the history of the anti-Stratfordian phenomenon from a mainstream perspective: The Poacher from Stratford (1958), by Frank Wadsworth, Shakespeare and His Betters (1958), by Reginald Churchill, The Shakespeare Claimants (1962), by H. N. Gibson, and Shakespeare and His Rivals: A Casebook on the Authorship Controversy (1962), by George L. McMichael and Edgar M. Glenn. In 1959 the American Bar Association Journal published a series of articles and letters on the authorship controversy, later anthologised as Shakespeare Cross-Examination (1961). In 1968 the newsletter of The Shakespeare Oxford Society reported that "the missionary or evangelical spirit of most of our members seems to be at a low ebb, dormant, or non-existent". In 1974, membership in the society stood at 80.

=== Authorship in the mainstream media ===
The freelance writer Charlton Ogburn Jr., elected president of The Shakespeare Oxford Society in 1976, promptly began a campaign to bypass the academic establishment; he believed it to be an "entrenched authority" that aimed to "outlaw and silence dissent in a supposedly free society". He proposed fighting for public recognition by portraying Oxford as a candidate on equal footing with Shakespeare. In 1984 Ogburn published his 900-page The Mysterious William Shakespeare: the Myth and the Reality, and by framing the issue as one of fairness in the atmosphere of conspiracy that permeated America after Watergate, he used the media to circumnavigate academia and appeal directly to the public. Ogburn's efforts secured Oxford as the most popular alternative candidate. He also kick-started the modern revival of the Oxfordian movement by adopting a policy of seeking publicity through moot court trials, media debates, television, and other outlets. These methods were later extended to the Internet, including Wikipedia.

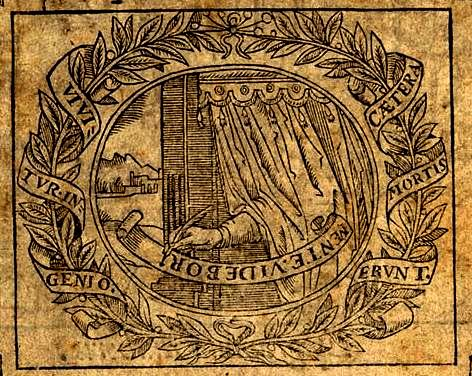
A device from Henry Peacham's Minerva Britanna (1612) has been used by Baconians and Oxfordians alike as coded evidence for concealed authorship of the Shakespeare canon.

Ogburn believed that academics were best challenged by recourse to law, and on 25 September 1987 three justices of the Supreme Court of the United States convened a one-day moot court at the Metropolitan Memorial United Methodist Church, to hear the Oxfordian case. The trial was structured so that literary experts would not be represented, but the burden of proof was on the Oxfordians. The justices determined that the case was based on a conspiracy theory and that the reasons given for this conspiracy were both incoherent and unpersuasive. Although Ogburn took the verdict as a "clear defeat", Oxfordian columnist Joseph Sobran thought the trial had effectively dismissed any other Shakespeare authorship contender from the public mind and provided legitimacy for Oxford. A retrial was organised the next year in the United Kingdom to potentially reverse the decision. Presided over by three Law Lords, the court was held in the Inner Temple in London on 26 November 1988. On this occasion Shakespearean scholars argued their case, and the outcome confirmed the American verdict.

Due in part to the rising visibility of the authorship question, media coverage of the controversy increased, with many outlets focusing on the Oxfordian theory. In 1989 the Public Broadcasting Service television show Frontline broadcast "The Shakespeare Mystery", exposing the interpretation of Oxford-as-Shakespeare to more than 3.5 million viewers in the US alone. This was followed in 1992 by a three-hour Frontline teleconference, "Uncovering Shakespeare: an Update", moderated by William F. Buckley, Jr. In 1991 The Atlantic Monthly published a debate between Tom Bethell, presenting the case for Oxford, and Irvin Leigh Matus, presenting the case for Shakespeare. A similar print debate took place in 1999 in Harper's Magazine under the title "The Ghost of Shakespeare". Beginning in the 1990s Oxfordians and other anti-Stratfordians increasingly turned to the Internet to promulgate their theories, including creating several articles on Wikipedia about the candidates and the arguments, to such an extent that a survey of the field in 2010 judged that its presence on Wikipedia "puts to shame anything that ever appeared in standard resources".

On 14 April 2007 the Shakespeare Authorship Coalition issued an Internet petition, the "Declaration of Reasonable Doubt About the Identity of William Shakespeare", coinciding with Brunel University's announcement of a one-year Master of Arts programme in Shakespeare authorship studies (since suspended). The coalition intended to enlist broad public support so that by 2016, the 400th anniversary of Shakespeare's death, the academic Shakespeare establishment would be forced to acknowledge that legitimate grounds for doubting Shakespeare's authorship exist, a goal that was not successful. More than 1,200 signatures were collected by the end of 2007, and as of 23 April 2016, the 400th anniversary of Shakespeare's death and the self-imposed deadline, the document had been signed by 3,348 people, including 573 self-described current and former academics. On 22 April 2007, The New York Times published a survey of 265 American Shakespeare professors on the Shakespeare authorship question. To the question of whether there is good reason to question Shakespeare's authorship, 6 per cent answered "yes", and 11 percent "possibly". When asked their opinion of the topic, 61 per cent chose "A theory without convincing evidence" and 32 per cent chose "A waste of time and classroom distraction".

In 2010 James S. Shapiro surveyed the authorship question in Contested Will: Who Wrote Shakespeare? Approaching the subject sociologically, Shapiro found its origins to be grounded in a vein of traditional scholarship going back to Edmond Malone, and criticised academia for ignoring the topic, which was, he argued, tantamount to surrendering the field to anti-Stratfordians. Shapiro links the revival of the Oxfordian movement to the cultural changes that followed the Watergate conspiracy scandal that increased the willingness of the public to believe in governmental conspiracies and cover-ups, and Robert Sawyer suggests that the increased presence of anti-Stratfordian ideas in popular culture can be attributed to the proliferation of conspiracy theories since the 9/11 attacks.

In September 2011, Anonymous, a feature film based on the "Prince Tudor" variant of the Oxfordian theory, written by John Orloff and directed by Roland Emmerich, premiered at the Toronto International Film Festival. De Vere is portrayed as a literary prodigy who becomes the lover of Queen Elizabeth, with whom he sires Henry Wriothesley, 3rd Earl of Southampton, only to discover that he himself may be the Queen's son by an earlier lover. He eventually sees his suppressed plays performed through the front man, William Shakespeare, who is portrayed as an opportunistic actor and the movie's comic foil. Oxford agrees to Elizabeth's demand that he remain anonymous as part of a bargain for saving their son from execution as a traitor for supporting the Essex Rebellion against her.

Two months before the release of the film, the Shakespeare Birthplace Trust launched a campaign attacking anti-Stratfordian arguments by means of a web site, 60 Minutes With Shakespeare: Who Was William Shakespeare?, containing short audio contributions recorded by actors, scholars and other celebrities, which was quickly followed by a rebuttal from the Shakespeare Authorship Coalition. Since then, Paul Edmondson and Stanley Wells have written a short e-book, Shakespeare Bites Back (2011), and edited a longer book of essays by prominent academic Shakespeareans, Shakespeare Beyond Doubt (2013), in which Edmondson says that they had "decided to lead the Shakespeare Authorship Campaign because we thought more questions would be asked by our visitors and students because of Anonymous, because we saw, and continue to see, something very wrong with the way doubts about Shakespeare's authorship are being given academic credibility by the Universities of Concordia and Brunel, and because we felt that merely ignoring the anti-Shakespearians was inappropriate at a time when their popular voice was likely to be gaining more ground".

== Alternative candidates ==
While more than 80 historical figures have been suggested at one time or another as the true author of the Shakespearean canon, only a few of these claimants have attracted significant attention. In addition to solo candidates, various "group" theories have also achieved a notable level of interest.

=== Group theories ===
Various group theories of Shakespearean authorship were proposed as early as the mid-19th century. The first book focused entirely on the authorship debate, Delia Bacon's The Philosophy of the Plays of Shakespeare Unfolded (1857), proposed the first "group theory". It attributed the works of Shakespeare to "a little clique of disappointed and defeated politicians" led by Sir Walter Raleigh which included Sir Francis Bacon and perhaps Edmund Spenser, Lord Buckhurst, and Edward de Vere, 17th Earl of Oxford.

Gilbert Slater's The Seven Shakespeares (1931) proposed that the works were written by seven different authors: Francis Bacon, Edward de Vere, 17th Earl of Oxford, Sir Walter Raleigh, William Stanley, 6th Earl of Derby, Christopher Marlowe, Mary Sidney, Countess of Pembroke, and Roger Manners, 5th Earl of Rutland. In the early 1960s, Edward de Vere, Francis Bacon, Roger Manners, William Herbert and Mary Sidney were suggested as members of a group referred to as "The Oxford Syndicate". Christopher Marlowe, Robert Greene and Thomas Nashe have also been proposed as participants in a group theory. Some variants of the group theory also include William Shakespeare of Stratford as the group's manager, broker and/or front man.

=== Sir Francis Bacon ===
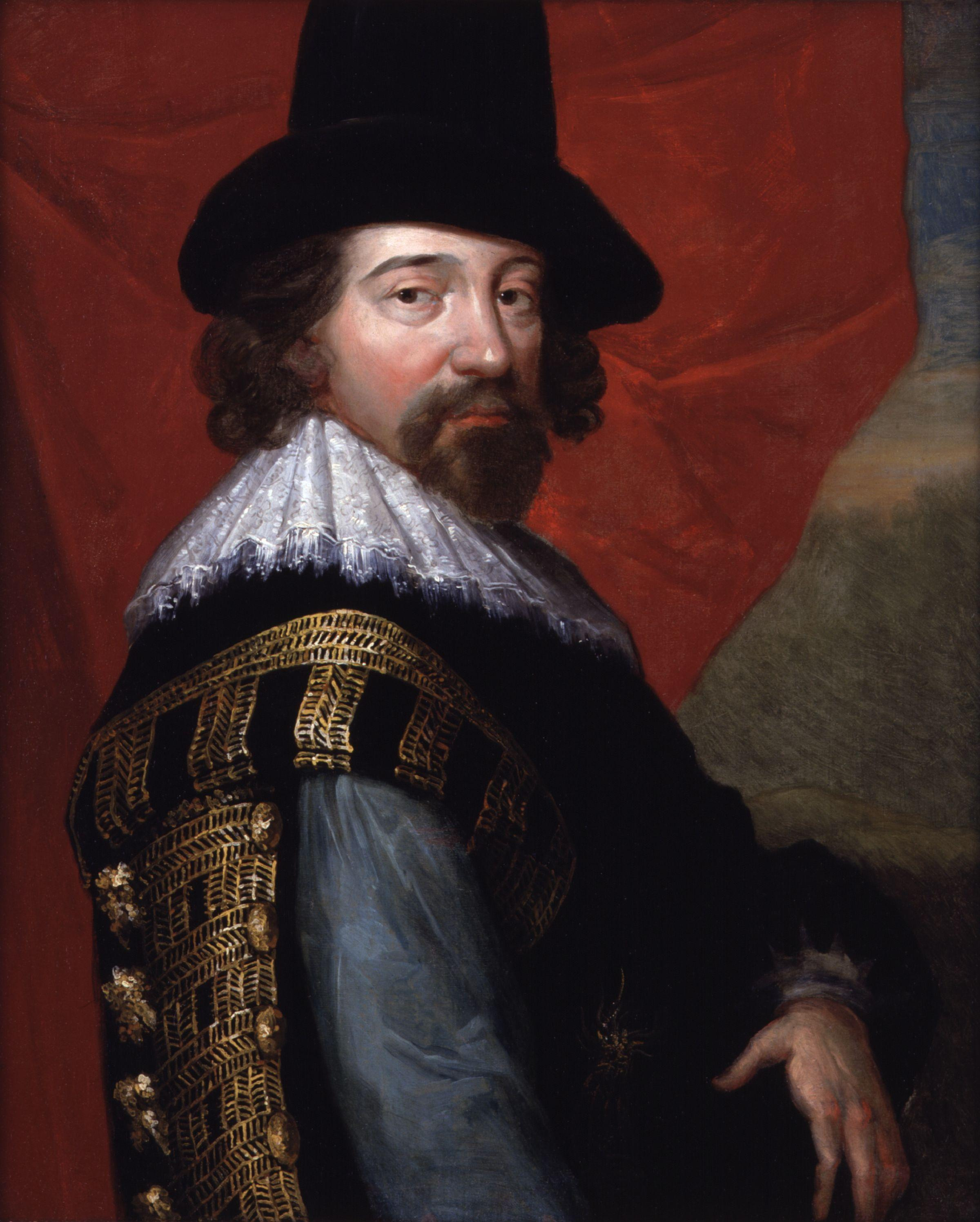
Sir Francis Bacon (1561–1626)

The leading candidate of the 19th century was one of the great intellectual figures of Shakespeare's time, Sir Francis Bacon, a lawyer, philosopher, essayist and scientist. Bacon's candidacy relies upon historical and literary conjectures, as well as alleged cryptographic evidence.

Bacon was proposed as sole author by William Henry Smith in 1856 and as a co-author by Delia Bacon in 1857. Smith compared passages such as Bacon's "Poetry is nothing else but feigned history" with Shakespeare's "The truest poetry is the most feigning" (As You Like It, 3.3.19–20), and Bacon's "He wished him not to shut the gate of your Majesty's mercy" with Shakespeare's "The gates of mercy shall be all shut up" (Henry V, 3.3.10). Delia Bacon argued that there were hidden political meanings in the plays and parallels between those ideas and Bacon's known works. She proposed him as the leader of a group of disaffected philosopher-politicians who tried to promote republican ideas to counter the despotism of the Tudor-Stuart monarchies through the medium of the public stage. Later Bacon supporters found similarities between a great number of specific phrases and aphorisms from the plays and those written by Bacon in his waste book, the Promus. In 1883, Mrs. Henry Pott compiled 4,400 parallels of thought or expression between Shakespeare and Bacon.

In a letter addressed to John Davies, Bacon closes "so desireing you to bee good to concealed poets", which according to his supporters is self-referential. Baconians argue that while Bacon outlined both a scientific and moral philosophy in The Advancement of Learning (1605), only the first part was published under his name during his lifetime. They say that his moral philosophy, including a revolutionary politico-philosophic system of government, was concealed in the Shakespeare plays because of its threat to the monarchy.

Baconians suggest that the great number of legal allusions in the Shakespeare canon demonstrate the author's expertise in the law. Bacon became Queen's Counsel in 1596 and was appointed Attorney General in 1613. Bacon also paid for and helped write speeches for a number of entertainments, including masques and dumbshows, although he is not known to have authored a play. His only attributed verse consists of seven metrical psalters, following Sternhold and Hopkins.

Since Bacon was knowledgeable about ciphers, early Baconians suspected that he left his signature encrypted in the Shakespeare canon. In the late 19th and early 20th centuries many Baconians claimed to have discovered ciphers throughout the works supporting Bacon as the true author. In 1881, C. F. Ashmead Windle, an American, claimed she had found carefully worked-out jingles in each play that identified Bacon as the author. This sparked a cipher craze, and probative cryptograms were identified in the works by Ignatius Donnelly, Orville Ward Owen, Elizabeth Wells Gallup, and Dr. Isaac Hull Platt. Platt argued that the Latin word honorificabilitudinitatibus, found in Love's Labour's Lost, can be read as an anagram, yielding Hi ludi F. Baconis nati tuiti orbi ("These plays, the offspring of F. Bacon, are preserved for the world.").

=== Edward de Vere, 17th Earl of Oxford ===
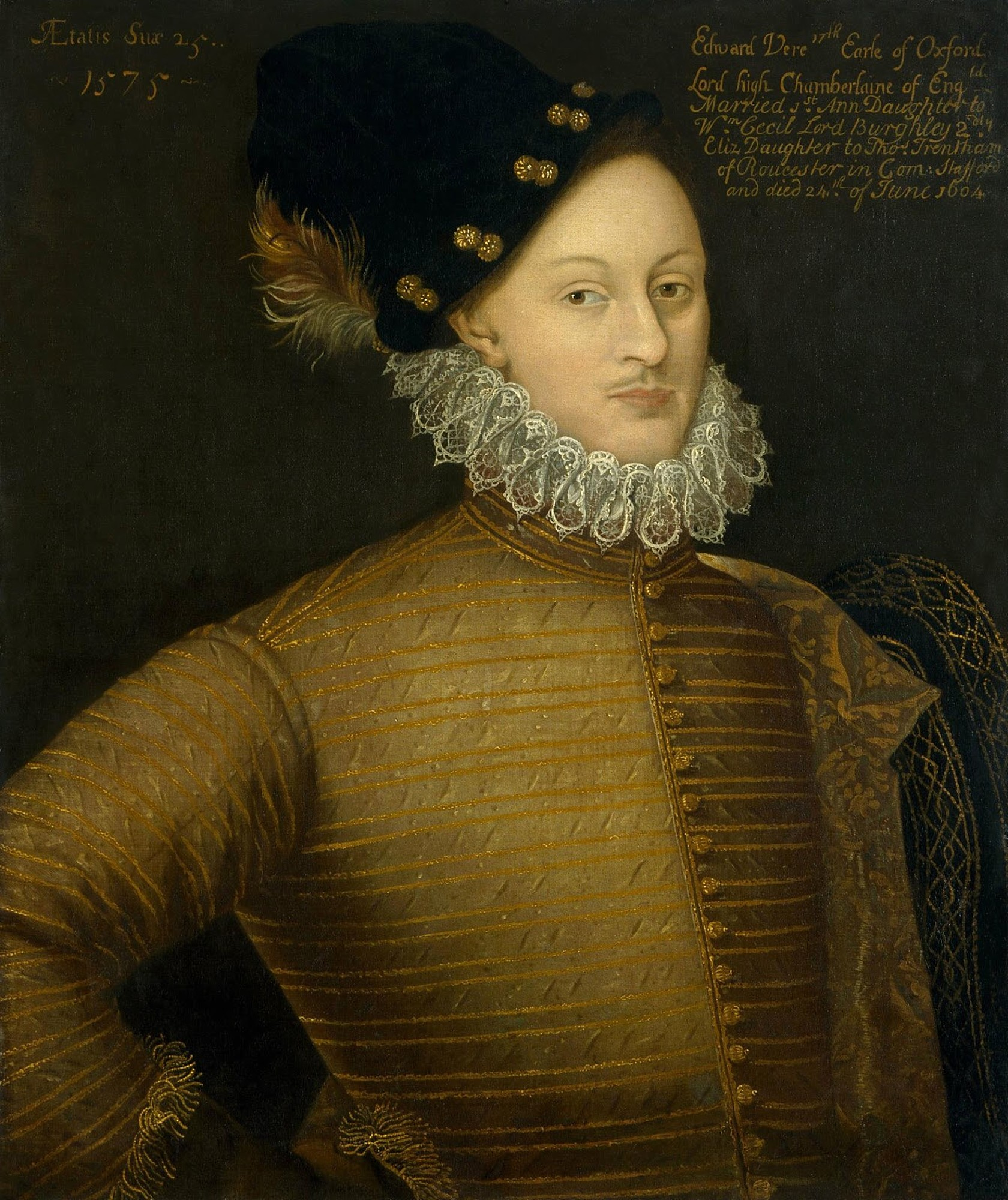
Edward de Vere, 17th Earl of Oxford (1550–1604)

Since the early 1920s, the leading alternative authorship candidate has been Edward de Vere, 17th Earl of Oxford and Lord Great Chamberlain of England. Oxford followed his grandfather and father in sponsoring companies of actors, and he had patronised a company of musicians and one of tumblers. Oxford was an important courtier poet, praised as such and as a playwright by George Puttenham and Francis Meres, who included him in a list of the "best for comedy amongst us". Examples of his poetry but none of his theatrical works survive. Oxford was noted for his literary and theatrical patronage. Between 1564 and 1599, 33 works were dedicated to him, including works by Arthur Golding, John Lyly, Robert Greene and Anthony Munday. In 1583 he bought the sublease of the first Blackfriars Theatre and gave it to the poet-playwright Lyly, who operated it for a season under Oxford's patronage.

Oxfordians believe certain literary allusions indicate that Oxford was one of the most prominent "suppressed" anonymous and/or pseudonymous writers of the day. They also note Oxford's connections to the London theatre and the contemporary playwrights of Shakespeare's day, his family connections including the patrons of Shakespeare's First Folio, his relationships with Queen Elizabeth I and Shakespeare's patron, the Earl of Southampton, his knowledge of Court life, his private tutors and education, and his wide-ranging travels through the locations of Shakespeare's plays in France and Italy. The case for Oxford's authorship is also based on perceived similarities between Oxford's biography and events in Shakespeare's plays, sonnets and longer poems; perceived parallels of language, idiom, and thought between Oxford's letters and the Shakespearean canon; and the discovery of numerous marked passages in Oxford's Bible that appear in some form in Shakespeare's plays.

The first to lay out a comprehensive case for Oxford's authorship was J. Thomas Looney, an English schoolteacher who identified personality characteristics in Shakespeare's works—especially Hamlet—that painted the author as an eccentric aristocratic poet, a drama and sporting enthusiast with a classical education who had travelled extensively to Italy. He discerned close affinities between the poetry of Oxford and that of Shakespeare in the use of motifs and subjects, phrasing, and rhetorical devices, which led him to identify Oxford as the author. After his Shakespeare Identified was published in 1920, Oxford replaced Bacon as the most popular alternative candidate.

Oxford's purported use of the "Shakespeare" pen name is attributed to the stigma of print, a convention that aristocratic authors could not take credit for writing plays for the public stage. Another motivation given is the politically explosive "Prince Tudor theory" that the youthful Oxford was Queen Elizabeth's lover; according to this theory, Oxford dedicated Venus and Adonis, The Rape of Lucrece, and the Sonnets to their son, England's rightful Tudor Prince, Henry Wriothesley, who was brought up as the 3rd Earl of Southampton.

Oxfordians say that the dedication to the sonnets published in 1609 implies that the author was dead prior to their publication and that 1604 (the year of Oxford's death) was the year regular publication of "newly corrected" and "augmented" Shakespeare plays stopped. Consequently, they date most of the plays earlier than the standard chronology and say that the plays which show evidence of revision and collaboration were left unfinished by Oxford and completed by other playwrights after his death.

=== Christopher Marlowe ===
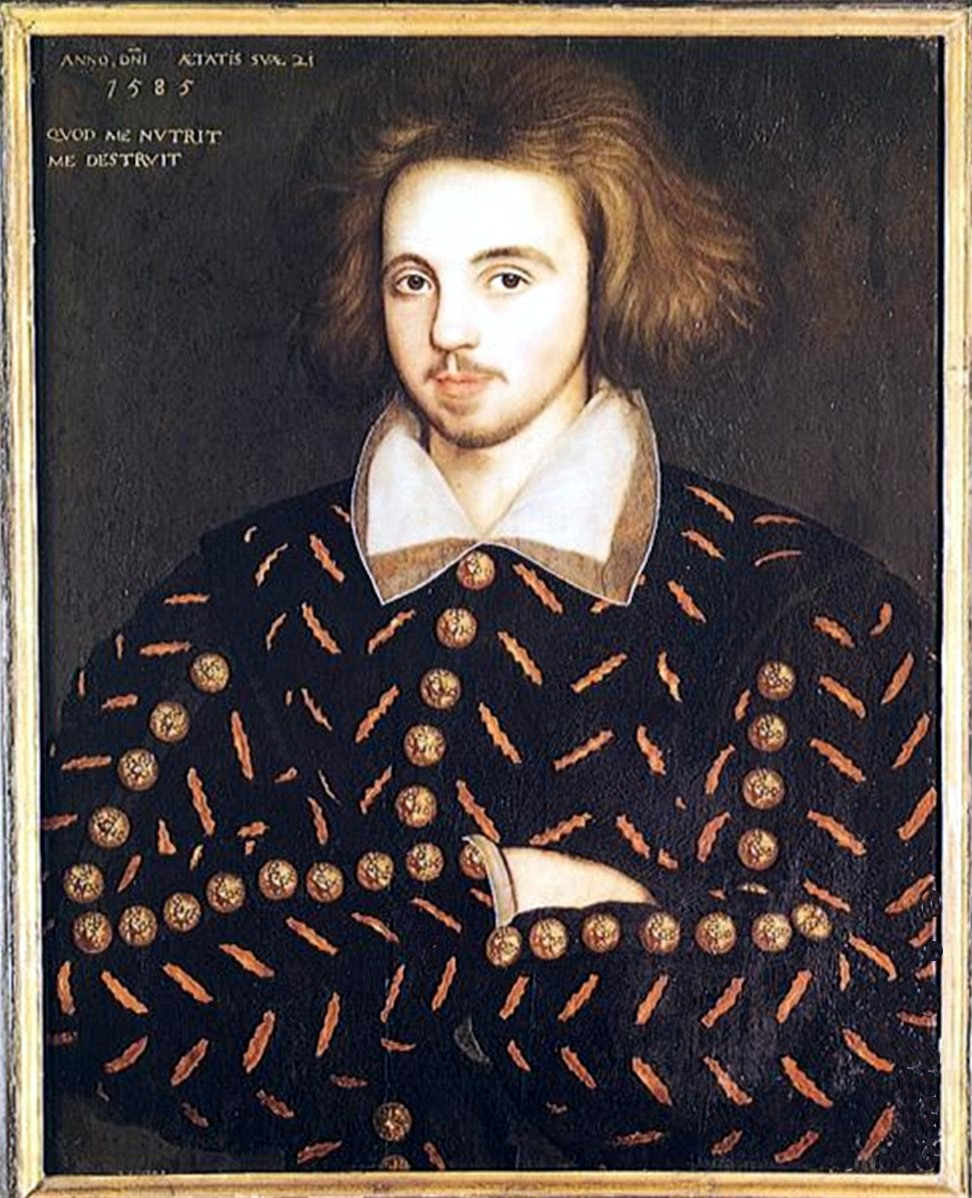
Portrait possibly of Christopher Marlowe (1564–1593)

The poet and dramatist Christopher Marlowe was born into a social class similar to Shakespeare's: his father was a cobbler, Shakespeare's a glove-maker. Marlowe was the older by two months, and spent six and a half years at Cambridge University. He pioneered the use of blank verse in Elizabethan drama, and his works are widely accepted as having greatly influenced those of Shakespeare. Of his seven plays, all but one or two were first performed before 1593.

The Marlovian theory argues that Marlowe's documented death on 30 May 1593 was faked. Thomas Walsingham and others are supposed to have arranged the faked death, the main purpose of which was to allow Marlowe to escape trial and almost certain execution on charges of subversive atheism. The theory then argues that Shakespeare was chosen as the front behind whom Marlowe would continue writing his highly successful plays. These claims are founded on inferences derived from the circumstances of his apparent death, stylistic similarities between the works of Marlowe and Shakespeare, and hidden meanings found in the works and associated texts.

Marlovians note that, despite Marlowe and Shakespeare being almost exactly the same age, the first work linked to the name William Shakespeare—Venus and Adonis—was on sale, with Shakespeare's name signed to the dedication, 13 days after Marlowe's reported death, having been registered with the Stationers' Company 12 days before the death with no named author. Lists of verbal correspondences between Marlowe's and Shakespeare's work have also been compiled.

Marlowe's candidacy was initially suggested in 1892 by T. W. White, who argued that Marlowe was one of a group of writers responsible for the plays, the others being Shakespeare, Greene, Peele, Daniel, Nashe and Lodge. He was first proposed as the sole author of Shakespeare's "stronger plays" in 1895 by Wilbur G. Zeigler. His candidacy was revived by Calvin Hoffman in 1955 and, according to Shapiro, a recent surge in interest in the Marlowe case "may be a sign that the dominance of the Oxfordian camp may not extend much longer than the Baconian one".

=== William Stanley, 6th Earl of Derby ===
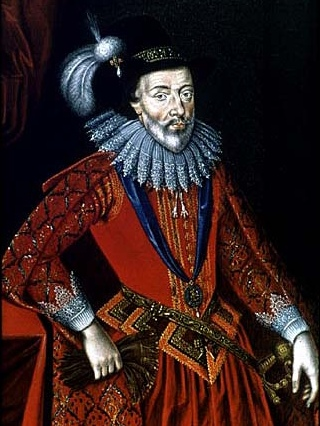
William Stanley, 6th Earl of Derby (1561–1642)

William Stanley, 6th Earl of Derby, was first proposed as a candidate in 1891 by James Greenstreet, a British archivist, and later supported by Abel Lefranc and others. Greenstreet discovered that a Jesuit spy, George Fenner, reported in 1599 that Derby "is busye in penning commodyes for the common players". That same year Derby was recorded as financing one of London's two children's drama companies, Paul's Boys; he also had his own company, Derby's Men, which played multiple times at court in 1600 and 1601. Derby was born three years before Shakespeare and died in 1642, so his lifespan fits the consensus dating of the works. His initials were W. S., and he was known to sign himself "Will", which qualified him to write the punning "Will" sonnets.

Derby travelled in continental Europe in 1582, visiting France and possibly Navarre. Love's Labour's Lost is set in Navarre and the play may be based on events that happened there between 1578 and 1584. Derby married Elizabeth de Vere, whose maternal grandfather was William Cecil, thought by some critics to be the basis of the character of Polonius in Hamlet. Derby was associated with William Herbert, 3rd Earl of Pembroke, and his brother Philip Herbert, Earl of Montgomery and later 4th Earl of Pembroke, the "Incomparable Pair" to whom William Shakespeare's First Folio is dedicated. When Derby released his estates to his son James around 1628–29, he named Pembroke and Montgomery as trustees. Derby's older brother, Ferdinando Stanley, 5th Earl of Derby, formed a group of players, the Lord Strange's Men, some of whose members eventually joined the King's Men, one of the companies most associated with Shakespeare.

== In fiction ==
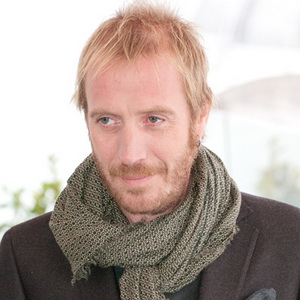
Rhys Ifans played Edward de Vere in the 2011 film Anonymous

Like many of Shakespeare's works, the Shakespeare authorship question has also entered into fiction of various genres. An early example is Zeigler's 1895 novel It was Marlowe: a Story of the Secret of Three Centuries.

Apart from the 2011 Oxfordian film Anonymous, other examples include Amy Freed's 2001 play The Beard of Avon, Ben Elton's 2016 sitcom Upstart Crow, and the 2020 fantasy comic book The Dreaming: Waking Hours, based on the works of Neil Gaiman. Modern novels include Gordon Korman's 2018 children's book WhatsHisFace and Jodi Picoult's 2024 By Any Other Name.
