= Notarial act =

Written narration of facts by Notary

A notarial act (or notarial instrument or notarial writing) is any written narration of facts (recitals) drawn up by a notary, notary public or civil-law notary authenticated by the notary's signature and official seal and detailing a procedure which has been transacted by or before the notary in their official capacity. A notarial act is the only lawful means of proving those facts of which it is the recognized record, whereas on other matters it is usually inadmissible, because, being beyond the powers entrusted to the notary by law, it is non-official. In most common-law countries, multiple-page acts are bound together using a sewn or knotted ribbon (referred to as silk), the ends of which are secured by a wafer impressed with the notary's seal. This is called annexing or annexure.

== Act in public form ==
The first category is known as an "act in public form" (Fr acte en minute, Du minuutakte, It atto conservato, Ger öffentliche Urkunde, Sp acta protocolar), and is the preserve of notaries-at-law. Public form acts may take the form of a record of some activity that is intended or required to have evidentiary status, legal or administrative force or effect, or commercial effect. Acts in this form remain the cornerstone of civil-law notarial practice according to which they are composed as single narrative instruments written in the first-person perspective of the notary. Public-form acts include all contracts and governing instruments (e.g. conveyance, will, trust, power of attorney, gift).

The components of an act in public form are:

- Protocol (preamble) which sets out introductory matters, noting:
  - Notary's name and status
  - Date and venue of act
  - The appearance of one or more parties (referred to as "appearers") and witnesses before the notary
  - Any capacity the appearer appears or is acting in
  - How the notary verified the facts or allegations in the corpus
- Corpus (operative part) which:
  - Recites appearer's intent
  - Narrates facts and accomplished procedures
  - Sets out the material terms and operative words (voces signatæ) of the power-of-attorney, contract, arrangement, obligation, conveyance, or other legal act embodied in the instrument
  - Refers to any appended material
- Eschatocol (conclusion) which attests and certifies:
  - That the document was read over to and acknowledged by the appearer, and signed (and in some cases sealed) by the appearer in the notary's and witnesses' presence, all in due form
  - That the conditions of applicable local law concerning the formalities of document execution and binding nature have been met
  - Often the date and venue are repeated
  - And finish with a signature block
    - Typical examples:
      - THUS DONE AND PASSED at the City and State aforesaid on the day and year first above written in the presence of the undersigned competent witnesses and before me, Notary, after due reading of the whole. (Louisiana)
      - THUS DONE AND EXECUTED at Pretoria on the day, month, and year above written in presence of the witnesses, x and y, who, together with the Appearers and me, the Notary, have signed the original hereof now remaining in my protocol. (South Africa)
        - Variations: THUS DONE AND CEDED (cession), THUS DONE AND GRANTED (grant, POA), THUS DONE AND INVENTORIED (public inventory), THUS DONE, CONTRACTED AND AGREED (contract).
- In the past, following an eschatocol would come further attestations which were additional notes concerning the due payment of notarial fees (including stamp duty), the acknowledgment of interlineations or corrections, the proper recording of the act, and any other post-editorial actions.

Traditionally, in civil-law countries, the preliminary drafts, called "minutes" (formerly protocols; Fr minute, Du minuut, It minuta, Ger Urschrift, Sp escritura matriz), are jotted in legal shorthand and record only the particulars. Their date, appearer, venue, and subject are logged in a notarial register, and the minutes are retained and kept in the notary's protocol (archive) while an engrossment (Fr/Du grosse, It copia esecutiva, Ger Ausfertigung, Sp primer testimonio), a fully extended form in longhand under seal and signature, is handed to the appearer. The minutes are used thereafter as a master copy from which exemplifications (Fr expédition, It copia autentica, Du (Netherlands) authentiek afschrift, (Belgium) uitgifte, Ger beglaubigte Abschrift, Sp testimonio ulterio, copia simple), i.e. engrossed fair copies, may be made. In common-law countries, notaries prepare multiple duplicate originals fully executed and sealed, as a copy would not be admissible in court. One is archived as a file copy in the notary's protocol.

== Act in private form ==
The second category is known as an "act in private form" (Fr acte en brevet, Du brevetakte, akte in originali, It atto rilasciato in originale, Ger notarielle Beglaubigung, Sp acta extraprotocolar), best represented by the notarial certificate (or "docquet" in Scotland). This is generally a writing that certifies the due execution in the notary's presence of a deed, contract or other writing or verifies some fact or thing of which the notary has certain knowledge. Notarial certificates are endorsed on or appended to a pre-existing document and attest to its due execution, genuine nature, and validity, or legal status and effects. As a safety precaution, the certificate may also contain information such as the number of pages, a description of the document, its title, and any other distinguishing features to prevent pages from being added or removed. If affixed, short-form certificates may also be embossed with a seal, half on the certificate and half on the rest of the page.

Notarial certificates come in full forms or short forms. A full form includes preamble information like the date, venue, appearer's appearance, proof of identification, and so forth, as well as the principal attestation. A short form usually only includes the venue, date, and "attestation clause". Both are then ended with a "testimonium clause".

Typical parts are:

- The caption which includes the venue, a large right-facing bracket or parentheses followed by "to wit" or the abbreviation ss. for Latin scilicet which means the same thing, and to the right is the title, usually in reference to a case or matter;
- The preamble (see supra);
- The attestation proper, either in clause form or broken out into averments;
- The testimonium clause followed by a notary's signature, either styled with a large bracket and the appearer and witness signature block or with a signature block preceding and notary signature following.
  - Typical examples:
    - IN FAITH AND TESTIMONY WHEREOF I, the said Notary, have hereunto set and subscribed my hand and affixed my Notarial seal on this (day) day of (month) two thousand and (year). (India)
    - WHEREOF AN ACT being required, I, the said Notary, have granted these presents under my Notarial firm and Seal of Office to serve and avail as occasion shall or may require. (India, Ireland)
    - IN WITNESS of which I have subscribed my name and affixed my seal of office at (city) aforesaid this (day) of (month) Two thousand and (year). (Australia)
    - IN FAITH AND TESTIMONY whereof I the said notary have subscribed my name and set and affixed my seal of office at (city) aforesaid this (day) day of (month) two thousand and (year). (England)
    - IN TESTIMONY WHEREOF, I have hereunto set my Notarial form and official seal of Office. (Canada)
    - IN WITNESS WHEREOF, I have hereunto set my hand and seal of office. (U.S.)

== See also ==
- Notary public
- Civil law notary
- Documentality
