= Interline =

Interline may refer to:

- Interlineation in law
- Interlining, itineraries that use more than one airline
- Interline travel, also in airlines
- Freight interline system, for freight transport
- Interline spacing in typography
- Interlinear gloss in linguistics and pedagogy
- Interline twitter in interlaced displays

== Companies ==
- Interline Brands
- Interline Bus Services
- Interliner, Dutch express bus service
