= Thomas Freeman =

Thomas Freeman may refer to:

- Thomas Freeman (Australian cricketer) (1894–1965), Australian cricketer
- Thomas Freeman (New Zealand cricketer) (1923–2003), New Zealand cricketer
- Thomas Freeman (poet) (c. 1590–1630), English poet and epigrammatist
- Thomas Freeman (pirate) (fl. 1655–1680), English buccaneer and privateer
- Thomas Birch Freeman (1809–1890), missionary and colonial official
- Tommy Freeman (boxer) (1904–1986), World Welterweight boxing champion
- Thomas Freeman (debate coach) (1919–2020), lecturer and debate coach
- Thomas J. Freeman (1827–1891), justice of the Tennessee Supreme Court
- Thomas R. Freeman (1829–1893), American lawyer and Civil War Brigadier General
- Thomas Oscar Freeman, American murderer and murder victim
- Thomas W. Freeman (1824–1865), American politician
- Thomas Freeman (MP), in 1411, MP for Huntingdon
- Tomás Freeman (fl. 2000s–2010s), Gaelic footballer
- Jake Freeman (Thomas Jacob Freeman, born 1980), American hammer thrower

== See also ==
- Thomas Edwards-Freeman (1720s–1808), MP for Steyning
- Thomas Friedman (disambiguation)
