= Irvin Leigh Matus =

American scholar and autodidact

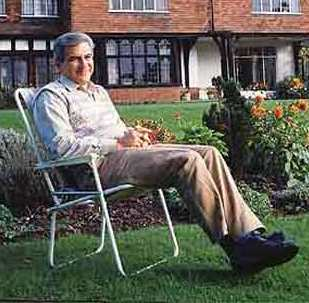
- Irvin Matus in England during a 1993 research trip
- Born: 25 July 1941; Brooklyn, New York
- Died: 5 January 2011 (aged 69); Silver Spring, Maryland
- Scientific career
- Fields: William Shakespeare; Baseball

Irvin Leigh Matus (July 25, 1941 – January 5, 2011) was an independent scholar, autodidact, and author. He is best known as an authority on Shakespeare, but also wrote about aspects of Brooklyn's history such as the Vitagraph Studios, and developed a method of modelling baseball statistics. He was a scholar-in-residence at Shepherd University for the academic year 1992–1993. He was based in Washington, DC.

== Early life ==
Matus's father was manager of the Western Union office in Times Square. The late congressman Stephen J. Solarz was his cousin. Matus was born and raised in Brooklyn, New York, where he lived until 1971. He graduated from Erasmus Hall High School in 1958, and briefly studied commercial art at the Pratt Institute in New York. His primary interests at the time focused on baseball, American history and rhythm and blues, his musical interests being influenced by his early friendship with Alan Freed. Together with his brother Paul he ran an urban transport business until he was drafted in 1965 into United States Army. Stationed on Staten Island, he won the Army Commendation Medal for meritorious service.

== Baseball ==
A keen reader of baseball statistics, in 1978 he published an article anticipating what was later to be known as sabermetric analysis, though Matus would distinguish his own methods from the mechanical computerized techniques of contemporary sabermetrics, an approach he characterizes as "the baseball version of Oxfordianism." The article analysed pitching stats on 162 scorecards for one year, 1976 to examine the view of pitching coaches at the time that 135 pitches (15 per innings) was the average for a complete game. Tom Seaver relied on this standard yardstick in evaluating a pitcher's performance, that he is doing well if he throws about 15 pitches per innings. By a close break-down of statistics, based his analysis on average of 14 pitches per inning after six innings, Matus showed that the contrary was the case, and concluded: "The evidence clearly indicates that, for endurance and effectiveness in any given game, 14 pitches or less per innings as an average is preferable for most pitchers."

At the time of his death, he was working on a comprehensive history of baseball.

== Researching Shakespeare ==
His interest in Shakespeare dated back to high school, though he once confessed that his notion of a good read consisted back then of reading a Brooklyn Dodger box-score sheet. Shakespeare classes tortured him for the impression they gave that Shakespeare wrote footnotes. Yet one day, while walking down Flatbush Avenue, a line—"You blocks, you stones, you worse than senseless things!"—from Julius Caesar floated to mind and seemed to sum up the appearance of the crowd he encountered. He suddenly realized that, unwittingly, he had been memorizing large swathes of Shakespeare. He became a dedicated Shakespearean shortly afterwards, on watching Richard Burton's performance as Edwin Booth in the film Prince of Players.

=== Shakespeare, the Living Record ===
Matus would read the history plays together with biographies of the kings they featured, and discovered, from earlier period tourist brochures, an article by A.L. Rowse and one by Louis Wright, past director of the Folger Shakespeare Library, that the artifacts and physical environment of Shakespeare's life were poorly represented. In 1983, impressed by reading a book on English architecture, he scoured the libraries to find information linking Elizabethan buildings to Shakespeare, only to find that virtually no good reference books had been written. After a brief trip to England for roughly six weeks in 1984, he and his brother Paul sold their home on Long Island, and Matus used his proceeds to finance his research project on this topic—which entailed a second 6-month journey in a camper van—to examine buildings on-site and interview archivists, preservationists, and historians. Returning to the United States in November 1985, he moved to Washington to finalize his research by reading in the Folger Library. There Samuel Schoenbaum, the doyen of Shakespearean biographers, assisted him in securing access to its restricted collections.

Almost wholly self-financed, Matus eked out a living by working part-time jobs, while finding accommodation as a house-sitter. In June, 1987, he received a $2,500 grant that allowed him to buy a $650 word processor and begin his writing. Shakespearean scholar Richard Dutton read his manuscript, and submitted it to Macmillan, remarking that:

It's very thorough, archival, back-to-the-grass-roots, trust-nothing, find-the-first-sources scholarship... And so little scholarship is like that. He's done an amazing job of collecting that sort of information.

In the meantime he published an article, "An Early Reference to the Coventry Corpus Christi Pageants in Shakespeare?" suggesting a possible source for Shakespeare's metaphor, in "The Tragedy of King Richard III", of the "worm of conscience" in the Doomsday play of the Drapers' Guild in 1561.

The resulting book, Shakespeare, the Living Record , published by Palgrave Macmillan in 1991, took the form of a travelogue of modern-day England pertaining to persons and places associated with Shakespeare or mentioned in his plays. Stanley Wells thought this 'freelance' contribution sounded 'refreshingly up-to-date'.

=== The Shakespeare authorship question: Shakespeare, In Fact ===
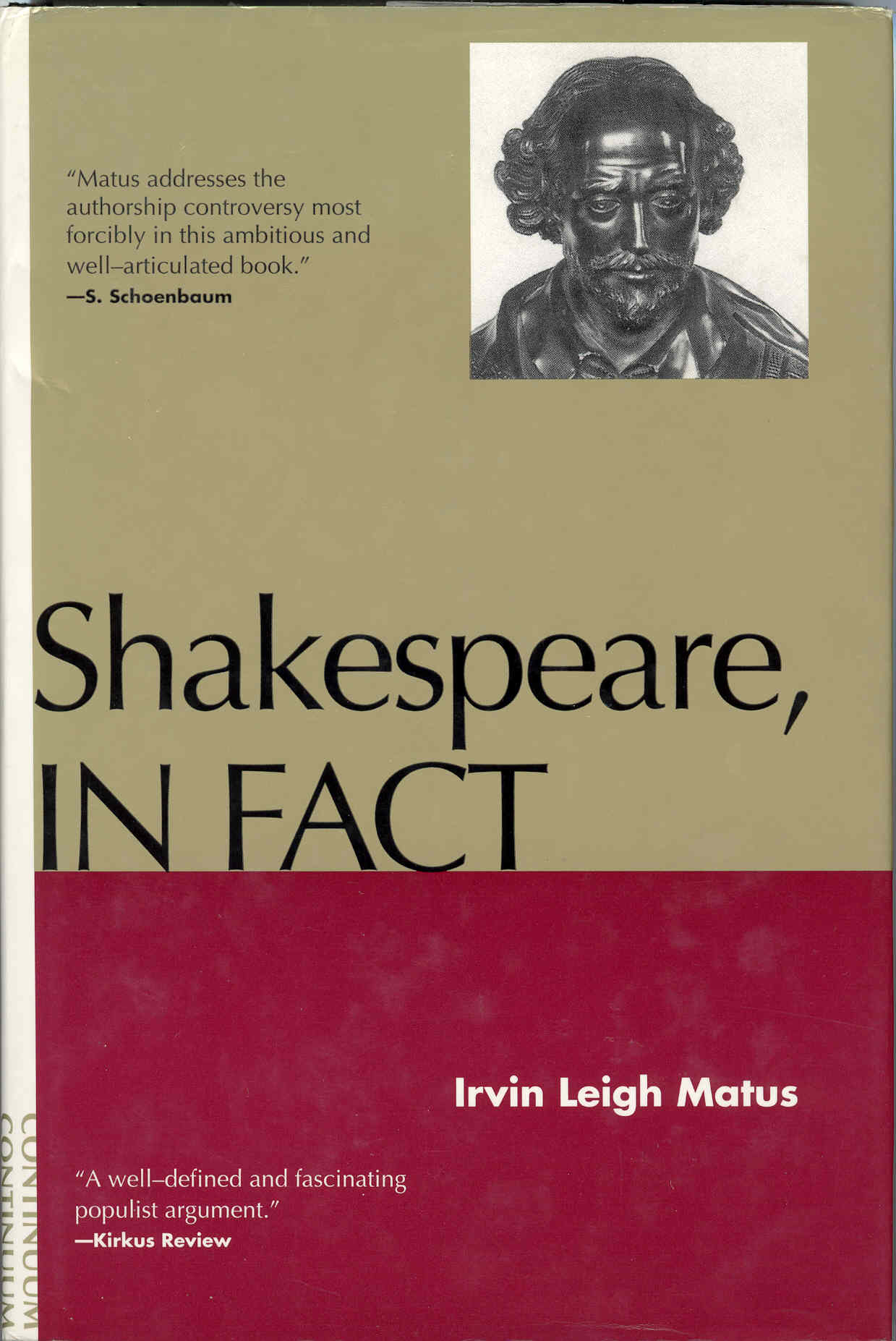
Matus's book rebutting anti-Stratfordian arguments was described by Shakespeare scholar David Bevington as "fair, balanced, and persuasive."

In February 1989 he was asked by the Shakespeare Authorship Roundtable to investigate the scholarship of the Shakespeare authorship controversy and was invited to speak to the membership in Los Angeles about his findings. Matus, according to Jonathan Bate, came to the controversy as an agnostic. (Note: "Matus came from outside the academic Shakespeare establishment and began from a position of agnosticism, but ended up demolishing every pro-Oxford argument.") Up until this particular research interest emerged, his interest in Shakespeare had been almost entirely focused on the plays, not their author. He flew to Los Angeles in August 1989 and spent two months there. His visit culminated in an address he delivered to members of the Roundtable in September, in which he remarked that, though he found the members honest, thoughtful, gracious, and cordial, his research found much fault with Oxfordian scholarship and led him to the conclusion that William Shakespeare was the true author of the works.

Matus then turned to write a comprehensive book on the Shakespearean authorship question. He returned to England in 1993 for another five months, primarily to research in the British Library. In Matus's view, the long history of the debate in public controversy and both amateurish and professional speculation had been usually ignored by scholars. He defended his method by arguing for the following principle:

It is the rule of controversialist scholarship, the error rate of which hovers around 100 percent, that a single flaw in a work of orthodox scholarship, whether perceived or actual—or fabricated—is sufficient in their eyes to cast doubt upon the accuracy and authenticity of the entire work.

He took the "Stratfordian" perspective, advocating the orthodox view that William Shakespeare of Stratford-on-Avon, was the primary author of the plays attributed to him. Matus went on to defend this position against the Oxfordian theory, (Note: Briefly stated, proponents of the Oxfordian theory of Shakespeare authorship believe that Edward de Vere, 17th Earl of Oxford is the actual author of Shakespeare's works.) in the October 1991 issue of The Atlantic Monthly as part of a print debate written by advocates of both sides. He did the same in an article published as part of a similar debate in the April 1999 issue of Harper's Magazine. (Note: Matus has also published his contribution to his personal website.)

In Shakespeare, In Fact, Matus examined Oxfordian arguments, presenting both detailed rebuttals of the sceptical perspective and positive evidence for Shakespeare's authorship. On its publication, Shakespeare scholar Thomas Pendleton hailed the work as the most authoritative on the subject. (Note: "To the best of my knowledge, no previous Shakespeare scholar has engaged so much of what Oxfordians have presented as evidence for their positions, or has done so as thoroughly.") Writer Scott McCrea has praised it for its "original and valuable scholarship", while James S. Shapiro has recently referred "those interested in the strongest arguments in favor of Shakespeare’s authorship" to Matus's book. Gail Kern Paster, director of the Washington, DC–based Folger Shakespeare Library, judging its contribution more broadly, has written that Shakespeare, in Fact is recognized as "a reliable, trustworthy, and authoritative source for what we know for sure about Shakespeare." Dover Books reissued Shakespeare, In Fact in 2013, with a new introduction by Thomas Mann, former reference librarian at the Library of Congress.

While working on Shakespeare, In Fact Matus also investigated a different authorship question: Charles Hamilton's claim that he had found "Cardenio"—a lost play by Shakespeare. The play turned out to be the playhouse copy of Thomas Middleton's "The Second Maiden's Tragedy," and Matus reviewed Hamilton's book for the Times Literary Supplement.

== Later years ==
Matus lived on an income substantially under $4,000 per annum in his later years.

== Works ==
=== Books ===
- Shakespeare, the Living Record. St. Martin's Press. 1991. ISBN 978-0-312-04704-7.
- Shakespeare, In Fact. New York and London: Continuum. 1994. ISBN 978-0-8264-0624-8.

=== Academic journals ===
- "Fifteen Pitches per Inning - More or Less?". The Baseball Research Journal. 40. Society for American Baseball Research. 1978.
- "An Early Reference to the Coventry Mystery Plays in Shakespeare?". Shakespeare Quarterly. 40 (2). Folger Shakespeare Library: 196–7. 1989. doi:10.2307/2870822. eISSN 1538-3555. ISSN 0037-3222. JSTOR 2870822.

=== Popular press ===
- "The Case for Shakespeare: In defense of Shakespeare as the author of the Shakespeare works". The Atlantic. No. 268. October 1991. ISSN 1072-7825.
- "The Shakespeare Dispute: Matus Replies". The Atlantic. No. 268. October 1991. ISSN 1072-7825.
- "The Reproof Valiant". Harper's Magazine. No. 298. April 1999. pp. 35–62. ISSN 0017-789X.

=== Miscellaneous ===
- "Where The Dream Was Made". Urbanography. 2000.

== Sources ==
- "Looking For Shakespeare: Two partisans explain and debate the authorship question". The Atlantic. No. 268. October 1991. pp. 43–61. ISSN 1072-7825.
- Bate, Jonathan (2008) [1998]. The Genius of Shakespeare. Pan Macmillan. ISBN 978-0-330-45843-6.
- Bethell, Tom (October 1991). "The Case for Oxford: Were the works of Shakespeare really written by the Earl of Oxford?". The Atlantic. No. 268. ISSN 1072-7825.
  - Matus, Irvin Leigh (October 1991). "The Shakespeare Dispute: Matus Replies". The Atlantic. No. 268. ISSN 1072-7825.
  - Matus, Irvin Leigh (October 1991). "The Case for Shakespeare: In defense of Shakespeare as the author of the Shakespeare works". The Atlantic. No. 268. ISSN 1072-7825.
  - Bethell, Tom (October 1991). "The Shakespeare Dispute: Bethell Replies". The Atlantic. No. 268. ISSN 1072-7825.
  - Dolnick, Edward (October 1991). "The Ghost's Vocabulary: How the computer listens for Shakespeare's "voiceprint"". The Atlantic. No. 268. ISSN 1072-7825.
- Anderson, Mark K.; Bate, Jonathan; Bethell, Tom; Bloom, Harold; Garber, Marjorie; Matus, Irvin Leigh; Paster, Gail Kern; Sobran, Joseph; Whalen, Richard F.; Wright, Daniel; et al. (April 1999). "The ghost of Shakespeare". Harper's Magazine. No. 298. pp. 35–62. ISSN 0017-789X.
- Mann, Thomas (2013). "Introduction to the Dover Edition". In Matus, Irvin Leigh (ed.). Shakespeare, In Fact. Dover books on literature and drama (reprint ed.). Courier Corporation. pp. 1–8. ISBN 978-0-486-32079-3.
- Matus, Irv (1978). "Fifteen Pitches per Inning - More or Less?". The Baseball Research Journal. 40. Society for American Baseball Research.
- Matus, Irvin Leigh (1989). "An Early Reference to the Coventry Mystery Plays in Shakespeare?". Shakespeare Quarterly. 40 (2). Folger Shakespeare Library: 196–7. doi:10.2307/2870822. eISSN 1538-3555. ISSN 0037-3222. JSTOR 2870822.
- Matus, Irvin Leigh (1991). Shakespeare, the Living Record. St. Martin's Press. ISBN 978-0-312-04704-7.
- Matus, Irvin Leigh (1994). Shakespeare, In Fact. New York and London: Continuum. ISBN 978-0-8264-0624-8.
- Matus, Irvin Leigh (August 5, 1994). "A forced marriage". London: Times Literary Supplement. p. 20.
- Matus, Irvin Leigh (April 1999). "The Reproof Valiant". Harper's Magazine. No. 298. pp. 35–62. ISSN 0017-789X. Archived from the original on 21 February 2014.
- Matus, Irvin Leigh (2000). "Where The Dream Was Made". Urbanography. Archived from the original on 23 August 2000.
- Matus, Irvin Leigh (2013) [orig. ed. 1994]. Shakespeare, In Fact. Dover books on literature and drama (reprint ed.). Courier Corporation. pp. 1–8. ISBN 978-0-486-32079-3.
- McCrea, Scott (2005). The Case for Shakespeare: The End of the Authorship Question. Greenwood Publishing Group. ISBN 978-0-275-98527-1.
- Naughton, Jim (5 January 1989). "Irvin Matus And His Solitary Journey; The Itinerant Life of a Driven Shakespearean". The Washington Post.
- Pendleton, Thomas A. (1994). "Irvin Matus's Shakespeare, IN FACT". Shakespeare Newsletter. 44 (Summer). University of Illinois at Chicago: 21, 26–30. ISSN 0037-3214.
- Phillips, Christopher; Gross, Ken (22 May 1989). "Left Homeless, Irvin Matus Preferred the Bard to a Bed". People. Vol. 31, no. 20. Time Inc. ISSN 0093-7673.
- Schinkel, Anders (2007). Conscience and Conscientious Objections. Pallas Proefschriften Series. Amsterdam University Press. ISBN 9789085553915.
- Schudel, Matt (5 March 2011). "A Local Life: Irvin Leigh Matus, 69, penniless Shakespeare scholar who lived by his own design". The Washington Post. Archived from the original on 24 March 2017.
- Shapiro, James (2010). Contested Will: Who Wrote Shakespeare?. US edition: Simon & Schuster. ISBN 978-1-4165-4162-2.
- Wells, Stanley (2002). "This Year's Contributions to Shakespeare Studies". Shakespeare Survey. Vol. 45.
