= Tom Friedman =

Tom Friedman may refer to:

- Tom Friedman (artist) (born 1965), American sculptor
- Thomas Friedman (born 1953), journalist and author

== See also ==
- Thomas Freeman (disambiguation)
