= The Romance of Yachting =

The Romance of Yachting: Voyage The First
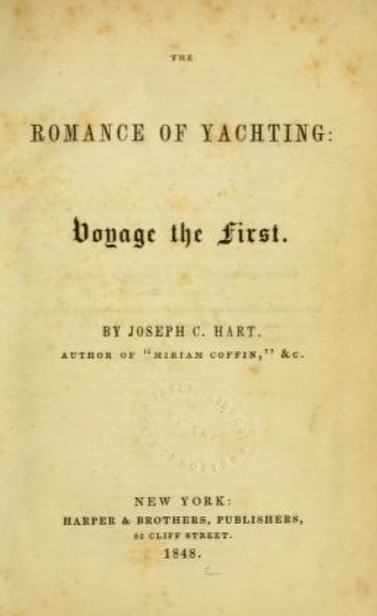
- Title page for The Romance of Yachting: Voyage The First (1848)
- Author: Joseph C. Hart
- Publisher: Harper & Brothers
- Publication date: 1848
- Publication place: United States
- Pages: 332

The Romance of Yachting (full title: The Romance of Yachting: Voyage The First) is an 1848 work by Joseph C. Hart published by Harper and Brothers. The work is considered notable for being the first work to claim that William Shakespeare was not the true author of the plays that are attributed to him. The work was for a long time overlooked in the Shakespeare authorship question debate with an article in the Chambers's Edinburgh Journal generally being treated by all authorities as the first work that questioned whether Shakespeare was the true author. References to The Romance of Yachting first appeared in The Bibliography of the Bacon-Shakespeare Literature. Despite its title, the book has little to say about yachting and has been described as a 'kind of horn book of digression'. Wyman characterize the work as a 'gossipy account of a voyage to Spain'.
