= Thomas Jenkins (headmaster) =

16th-century English headmaster

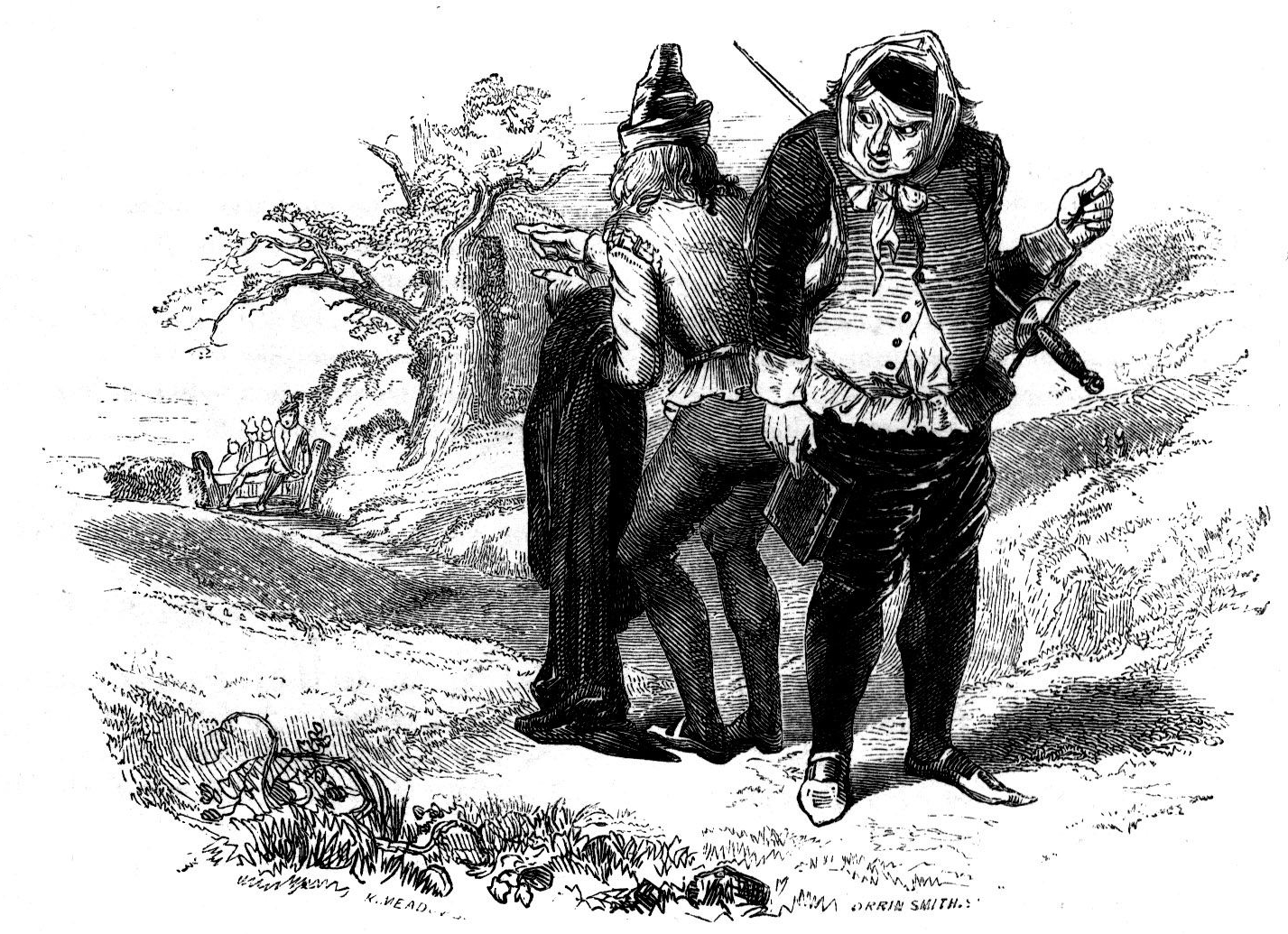
Sir Hugh Evans and Simple from The Merry Wives of Windsor. The character Sir Hugh Evans may have been inspired by Thomas Jenkins.

Thomas Jenkins was the headmaster of the King Edward VI Grammar School in Stratford-upon-Avon from 1575 to 1579. As such, his claim to fame is that William Shakespeare is considered likely to have been one of his students. No school records from the period survive; however, Jenkins is believed to have been of Welsh extraction, and a Welsh schoolmaster Sir Hugh Evans features in Shakespeare's play The Merry Wives of Windsor. Jenkins would have taught Shakespeare Latin grammar and literature. It has been speculated that Jenkins taught, and awakened in Shakespeare, an interest in the legendary history of the British Isles, and as such influenced Shakespeare to create plays featuring this material, such as King Lear and Cymbeline.

== Bibliography ==
- Bradbrook, M. C. (1978). Shakespeare: The Poet in his World. New York: Columbia University Press. ISBN 9780231046497.
- Honan, Park (1999). Shakespeare: A Life. Oxford: Oxford University Press. ISBN 9780192825278.
