= Joseph C. Hart =

American writer (1798–1855)

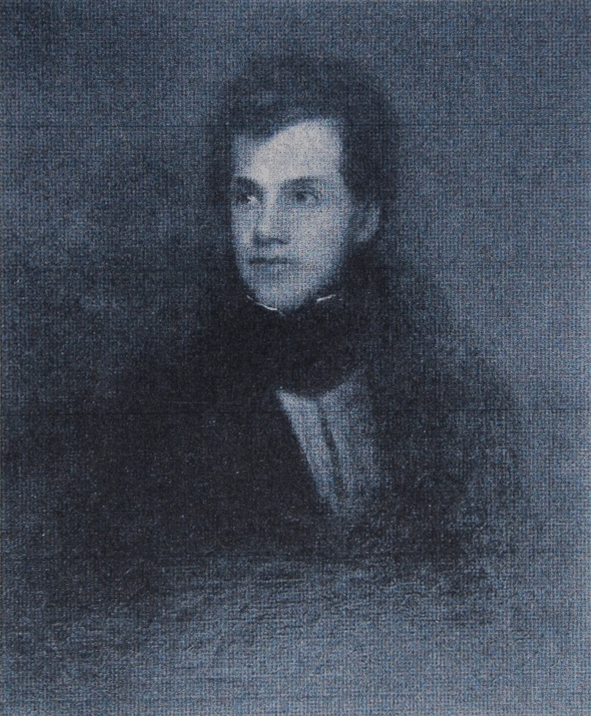
- Painting of Hart by Jerome Thompson, 1826
- Born: Joseph Coleman Hart; 1798
- Died: 1855 (aged 56–57); Santa Cruz de Tenerife, Canary Islands, Spanish Empire
- Occupation: Writer
- Years active: 1830s until his death
- Notable work: Miriam Coffin, The Romance of Yachting

Joseph Coleman Hart (1798–1855) was an American writer. He is now best known as the first person to assert in print that William Shakespeare was not the true author of the plays published under his name. His novel Miriam Coffin influenced Herman Melville, though Melville was also highly critical of Hart.

== Career ==
Hart was a lawyer by profession, who also served as a colonel in the National Guard and as a school principal. During this period he wrote a number of textbooks on geography. He was a longtime resident of New York and friend of several literary figures, occasionally working as a journalist. He later served as an American consul to Santa Cruz de Tenerife, where he died.

== Writings ==
=== Miriam Coffin ===
Hart became widely known with his novel Miriam Coffin; or, The Whale-Fisherman (1835). This was the first novel to deal with whaling in Nantucket, a subject later made famous by Herman Melville in Moby-Dick. Hart's work was the most important fictional influence on Melville's novel. Hart wrote the book to encourage congressional support for the whaling industry. He interviewed local people to obtain an accurate account of their lives and the workings of the industry. Unlike Melville, Hart concentrates on the community in Nantucket, and places less emphasis on the whalers. The novel was based on the historical career of profiteer Kezia Coffin (1723–1798). It describes the corrupt financial dealings of Miriam, a whaler's wife, whose unproductive market speculations are contrasted with the heroic and productive labors of her husband, fighting nature and dangerous savage peoples to bring home useful raw materials.

=== Shakespeare theories ===
Hart's views on Shakespeare were published in The Romance of Yachting (1848), a narrative of his travels to places that give him occasion for musings on a variety of topics. Pondering the fact that Shakespeare erroneously identifies a sea coast in landlocked Bohemia in The Winter's Tale, Hart argues that the mixture of ignorance and scholarship in Shakespeare's work suggests that the plays were collaborative productions, and that Shakespeare merely adapted the writings of more educated playwrights in order to make them commercially viable for the popular theater. Hart described Shakespeare as a "mere factotum of the theatre" and a "vulgar and unlettered man". He believed that adding obscene jokes to the plays of other writers was Shakespeare's main contribution.

Unlike later such theorists, Hart did not suggest that there was a conspiracy to hide the identity of the true authors, merely that evidence of their identities had been lost by the time the plays were published. Hart asserts that Shakespeare had been "dead for one hundred years and utterly forgotten" when in 1709 old playscripts were discovered and published under his name by Nicholas Rowe and Thomas Betterton. The error occurred because Shakespeare, as a shareholder in The King's Men, owned the manuscripts used by the theater. He speculates that only The Merry Wives of Windsor was Shakespeare's own work and suggests that Ben Jonson wrote most of Hamlet, Shakespeare himself contributing only the grave-digging scene.

Hart's views were published a number of years before Delia Bacon outlined her theory that Francis Bacon led a group of writers who used Shakespeare as a frontman. In 1886 it was alleged by George O. Seilhamer in The Times of Philadelphia that Hart had derived his ideas from a lecture by Bacon. Seilhamer describes Hart as "an old New York schoolmaster with a fondness for yachting and a schoolmaster's eagerness for literary reputation", claiming that he "was the first to enunciate a distorted version of Delia Bacon's theory," writing with "the diction of a schoolmaster and the brutality of a sailor." However, Hart's views bear very little resemblance to Delia Bacon's. Hart himself never attributes any of Shakespeare's work to Francis Bacon, but does repeat the mainstream view that Bacon was one of seven authors who contributed to the play The Misfortunes of Arthur.

Hart's views on Shakespeare were largely dismissed, since apparently he was unaware that Rowe's 1709 edition of Shakespeare was not the first publication of the works. Many of Shakespeare's plays and all his poems were published during his lifetime: the complete plays being published only seven years after his death in the First Folio. Herman Melville scathingly described Hart's book in his review as "an abortion" which "deserves to be burnt in a fire of asafetida, & by the hand that wrote it."
