= Thomas Freeman (poet) =

Jacobean English poet

Thomas Freeman, (ca. 1590–1630), was a minor English Jacobean poet and epigramist who is mostly remembered for writing an early poem addressed to Shakespeare. Freeman was born near Moreton-in-Marsh, Gloucestershire, and entered Magdalen College, Oxford, in 1607 at the age of 16 and matriculated with a Bachelor of Arts 22 June 1611.

After graduation he moved to London, and in 1614 published two collections of epigrams in one volume, Rvbbe, and A great Caste, and Rvnne And a great Cast: the second bowle, dedicated to Thomas, Lord Windsor. They were addressed to many of the contemporary poets as well as the poets of history, including Chaucer, Shakespeare, Daniel, Donne, Spenser, Heywood, and Chapman. His last poem was written in 1630 to commemorate the birth of Charles, Prince of Wales.

His Epigram 92 is an early example of Shakespeare criticism.

To Master W: Shakespeare.

Shakespeare, that nimble Mercury thy braine,
Lulls many hundred Argus-eyes asleepe,
So fit, for all thou fashionest thy vaine,
At th' horse-foote fountaine thou hast drunk full deepe,
Vertues or vices theame to thee all one is:
Who loues chaste life, there’s Lucrece for a Teacher:
Who list read lust there’s Venus and Adonis,
True modell of a most lasciuious leatcher.
Besides in plaies thy wit windes like Meander:
Whence needy new-composers borrow more
Thence Terence doth from Plautus or Menander.
But to praise thee aright I want thy store:

Then let thine owne works thine owne worth vpraise,
And help t'adorne thee with deserued Baies.

His epigram 37 has attracted some attention from modern readers, owing perhaps to its self-reflexive commentary:

Whoop, whoop, me thinkes I heare my Reader cry,
Here is rime doggrell: I confesse it I;
Nor to a certaine pace tie I my Muse;
I giue the Reines, anon the Curbe I vse;
And for the foote accordingly I fit her,
To diuerse matter vsing diuerse meeter,
Her lines, they are as long as I allot her,
As why not, vessels be as please the Potter,
Nor care I for a Censors ciuill hood,
I please my selfe, at home my Musicke's good.
