= Interlineation =

Legal term that signifies writing has been inserted between earlier language

Interlineation is a legal term that signifies writing has been inserted between earlier language. It is commonly used to indicate the insertion of new language between previous sentences in a contract, though it may also be used in other contexts. For example, interlineations can help to clarify specific points of a legal contract, and are useful if some of the terms of a contract become unclear later. They are typically initialed and dated, so as to make a record of changes and agreements to a particular contract.
