= Religious views of William Shakespeare =

The famous Chandos portrait (National Portrait Gallery), believed to depict William Shakespeare

The religious views of William Shakespeare are the subject of an ongoing scholarly debate dating back more than 150 years. The general assumption about William Shakespeare's religious affiliation is that he was a conforming member of the established Church of England. However, many scholars have speculated about his personal religious beliefs, based on analysis of the historical record and of his published work, with claims that Shakespeare's family may have had Catholic sympathies and that he himself was a secret Catholic.

== Shakespeare's known religious affiliation ==
Shakespeare and his immediate family were conforming members of the established Church of England. When Shakespeare was young, his father, John Shakespeare, was elected to several municipal offices, serving as an alderman and culminating in a term as bailiff, the chief magistrate of the town council, all of which required being a church member in good standing, and he participated in whitewashing over the Catholic images in the Chapel of the Guild of the Holy Cross and taking down the rood screen some time in the 1560s or 1570s.

Shakespeare's baptism and those of his siblings were entered into the parish church register, as were the births of his three children and the burials of family members. His brother Edmund, who followed him to London as an actor and died there, was buried in St Saviour's in Southwark "with a forenoone knell of the great bell", most likely paid for by the poet. As leaser of the parish tithes in Stratford, he was a lay rector of the church. He and his wife were buried in the church chancel, and a monument that included a half-figure bust of the poet was set into the north wall of the chancel.

Shakespeare failed twice to pay his taxes for St Helen's parish, Bishopsgate, London, where he is listed by name for the year 1596/7, and he is not among those "in any of the annual lists of residents of the Clink parish (St Saviour's) compiled by the officers who made the rounds to collect tokens purchased by churchgoers for Easter Communion, which was compulsory." An explanation is offered by historian Walter Godfrey, who suggests that the playwright's default at Bishopsgate was simply because he had moved to the Clink parish at the end of that year, where taxes were collected by the landowner (the bishop of Winchester) and not parish officials. The bishop then remitted the outstanding sum to Shakespeare's former parish "as a matter of convenience".

== Shakespeare's family ==
In 1559, five years before Shakespeare's birth, the Elizabethan Religious Settlement finally severed the Church of England from the Roman Catholic Church. In the ensuing years, extreme pressure was placed on England's Catholics to accept the practices of the Church of England, and recusancy laws made illegal any service not found in the Book of Common Prayer, including the Roman Catholic Mass. In Shakespeare's lifetime there was a substantial and widespread quiet resistance to the newly imposed reforms. Some scholars, using both historical and literary evidence, have argued that Shakespeare was one of these recusants. Rowan Williams, former archbishop of Canterbury, thinks that Shakespeare had a "recusant Catholic background."

Some scholars also believe there is evidence that several members of Shakespeare's family were recusant Catholics. The strongest evidence is a tract professing secret Catholicism signed by John Shakespeare, father of the poet. The tract was found in the 18th century in the rafters of a house which had once been John Shakespeare's, and was seen and described by the reputable scholar Edmond Malone. Malone later changed his mind and declared that he thought the tract was a forgery. Although the document has since been lost, Anthony Holden writes that Malone's reported wording of the tract is linked to a testament written by Charles Borromeo and circulated in England by Edmund Campion, copies of which still exist in Italian and English. Other research, however, suggests that the Borromeo testament is a 17th-century artefact (at the earliest dated from 1638), was not printed for missionary work, and could never have been in the possession of John Shakespeare. As of 2024, new research has attributed the tract to William's sister Joan (1569 – 1646), which could make it a genuine copy of Borromeo's document. John Shakespeare was listed as one who did not attend church services, but this was "for feare of processe for Debtte", according to the commissioners, not because he was a recusant.

Shakespeare's mother, Mary Arden, was a member of a conspicuous and determinedly Catholic family in Warwickshire. In 1606, Shakespeare's daughter Susanna was listed as one of the residents of Stratford who failed to take (Anglican) Holy Communion at Easter, which may suggest Catholic sympathies. It may, however, also be a sign of Puritan sympathies; Susanna was, according to some statements, of a Puritanical bent.

== Shakespeare's schooling ==
Four of the six schoolmasters at the grammar school of Shakespeare's youth, King's New School in Stratford, were Catholic sympathisers, and Simon Hunt, who may have been one of Shakespeare's teachers, later became a Jesuit priest. Thomas Jenkins, who succeeded Hunt as teacher in the grammar school, was a student of Edmund Campion at St John's College, Oxford. Jenkins's successor at the grammar school in 1579, John Cottam, was the brother of Jesuit priest Thomas Cottam.

== The "lost years" (1585–1592) ==
John Aubrey, in 1693, reported that Shakespeare had been a country schoolmaster, a tale augmented in the 20th century with the theory that his employer might have been Alexander Hoghton of Lancashire, a prominent Catholic landowner who left money in his will to a certain "William Shakeshafte", referencing theatrical costumes and paraphernalia. The Lancashire family of Shakespeare's schoolmaster, Cottam, (above) was associated with Hoghton's family. Shakespeare's grandfather Richard had also once used the name Shakeshafte. Peter Ackroyd adds that examinations of the marginal notes in the Hoghton family copy of Edward Hall's Chronicles, an important source for Shakespeare's early histories, "indicate the probability that Shakespeare and the annotator were the same man, but do not by any means prove it."

== Catholic sympathies ==
=== Possible Catholic wedding ===
Shakespeare's marriage to Anne Hathaway in 1582 may have been officiated by, amongst other candidates, John Frith in the town of Temple Grafton a few miles from Stratford. In 1586 the crown named Frith, who maintained the appearance of Protestantism, as a Catholic priest. Some surmise Shakespeare married in Temple Grafton rather than the Anglican church in Stratford in order for his wedding to be performed as a Catholic sacrament. He was thought to have rushed his marriage ceremony, as Anne was three months pregnant.

=== Historical sources ===
In 1611 the historian John Speed asserted Shakespeare's links with Catholicism, accusing him of satirising in Henry IV the Lollard (or proto-Protestant) martyr John Oldcastle (first portrayed by Shakespeare under his character's real name, then the alias John Falstaff after complaints from Oldcastle's descendants) and linking the playwright with the Jesuit Robert Persons, describing them together as "the Papist and his poet". Jean Christophe Mayer explains that Speed's jibe stems from nothing more than both men writing on the same subject: the English royal succession. Other modern critics have attributed other motives for Shakespeare's portrayal; the story of Oldcastle was a popular one and telling the tale from the "Papist" perspective (while acknowledging that perhaps this was a perspective with which Shakespeare already had some affinity) was an effective and familiar way to bring it to his audience. A direct explanation, however, comes from the facts of the original story: Prince Henry had left his dear friend Oldcastle to his fate after he had failed to persuade the stubborn old knight to recant when he was imprisoned for lollardry.

Archdeacon Richard Davies, an 18th-century Anglican cleric, wrote of Shakespeare: "He dyed a Papyst". The Catholic Encyclopedia (1912) states that "Davies, an Anglican clergyman, could have had no conceivable motive for misrepresenting the matter in these private notes and as he lived in the neighbouring county of Gloucestershire he may be echoing a local tradition" but concludes that Davies' comment "is by no means incredible, but it would obviously be foolish to build too much upon an unverifiable tradition of this kind".

Following E. K. Chambers and Ian Wilson, Joseph Pearce maintains that one of the most compelling pieces of evidence is Shakespeare's purchase of Blackfriars Gatehouse, a place that had remained in Catholic hands since the time of the Reformation, and was notorious for Jesuit conspiracies, priest holes to hide fugitives, and covert Catholic activity in London. The same year that one John Robinson was named as Shakespeare's tenant there, Robinson's brother Edward entered the seminary at the English College in Rome; Shakespeare ensured that the tenant Robinson remained in the house. Shakespeare's daughter Susanna, who inherited the house, continued his tenancy until 1639. Schoenbaum, however, assigns a purely fiscal motive to the purchase: after examining the complex financial arrangements surrounding the transaction he concludes, "an investment, pure and simple".

=== Textual evidence ===
An increasing number of scholars look to evidence from Shakespeare’s work, such as the placement of young Hamlet as a student at Wittenberg while old Hamlet's ghost is in purgatory, as suggestive of a Catholic worldview, but these speculations can be contradictory: the University of Wittenberg was an intellectual centre of the Protestant Reformation and the whole of Hamlet can be read as filled with "cryptic allusions to the Protestant Reformation". Other indications have been detected in the sympathetic view of religious life expressed in the phrase "thrice blessed", scholastic theology in The Phoenix and the Turtle, sympathetic allusions to English Jesuit Edmund Campion in Twelfth Night, and many other instances.

Beatrice Groves suggests that Shakespeare was simply playing upon an English Catholic tradition, rather than actually being Catholic, and was using the symbolic nature of Catholic ceremony to embellish his own theatre. Literary scholar David Daniell arrives at a similar conclusion, but from the opposite direction: as a good Protestant Shakespeare used many biblical allusions and quotations in his works, but only because his audience, well versed in the Bible in English, would quickly take his meaning. However, David Beauregard points out that the plays echo both Protestant and Catholic translations of the Bible, with some forty verbal correspondences to the 1582 Rheims New Testament, and they also conflict with the Elizabethan Homilies on at least ten theological topics, such as purgatory, prayers for the dead, indulgences, pilgrimages, merit, auricular confession and satisfaction. Schoenbaum suspects Catholic sympathies of some kind or another in Shakespeare and his family, but considers the writer himself to be a less than pious person with essentially worldly motives: "...the artist takes precedence over the votary".

Literary scholar and Jesuit Father Peter Milward and the writer Clare Asquith are among those who have written that Catholic sympathies are detectable in Shakespeare's works. Asquith believed that Shakespeare uses terms such as "high" when referring to Catholic characters and "low" when referring to Protestants (the terms refer to their altars) and "light" or "fair" to refer to Catholic and "dark" to refer to Protestant, a reference to certain clerical garbs. Asquith also detects in Shakespeare's work the use of a simple code used by the Jesuit underground in England which took the form of a mercantile terminology wherein priests were "merchants" and souls were "jewels", those pursuing them were "creditors", and the Tyburn gallows, where the members of the underground died, was called "the place of much trading". The Jesuit underground used this code so their correspondences looked like innocuous commercial letters, and Asquith believed that Shakespeare also used this code. Asquith's conclusions, however, have met with considerable criticism and evidence of a hidden code has been called "dubious". According to professor Jeffrey Knapp, the work of scholars like Peter Milward, who believe that "the deepest inspiration in Shakespeare's plays is both religious and Christian", has had "little influence on recent Shakespeare scholarship". John Finnis and Patrick Martin have argued more recently that Catholic martyr Anne Line is the eponymous phoenix of The Phoenix and the Turtle and her husband Roger is the eponymous turtle. They believe, with Asquith, that the poem's "bird of loudest lay" represents the composer William Byrd and that the crow is the Jesuit Henry Garnet.

=== Revision of older plays ===
Although Shakespeare commonly adapted existing tales, typically myths or works in another language, Joseph Pearce claims that King John, King Lear and Hamlet were all works that had been done recently and in English with an anti-Catholic bias, and that Shakespeare's versions appear to be a refutation of the source plays. Pearce believes otherwise he would not have "reinvented the wheel", revisiting recent English plays. Peter Milward is among those who hold the view that Shakespeare engaged in rebuttal of recent English "anti-Papist" works. Again, David Beauregard points out that, in the Italian source for Measure for Measure, the secular heroine is seduced and finally married, but Shakespeare revises his characterisation, so that her counterpart Isabella becomes a Poor Clare novice who maintains her virginity and does not marry. On the other hand, Jonathan Bate describes the process of Leir's transformation into Lear as replacing the "external trappings of Christianity" with a pagan setting. He adds that the devils plaguing "Poor Tom" in Shakespeare's version have the same names as the evil spirits in a book by Samuel Harsnett, later Archbishop of York, that denounces the "fake" Catholic practice of exorcism.

=== Inscriptions at the Venerable English College ===
The names "Arthurus Stratfordus Wigomniensis" and "Gulielmus Clerkue Stratfordiensis" are found within ancient inscriptions at the Venerable English College, a seminary in Rome which has long trained Catholic clergy serving in Britain. Scholars have speculated that these names might be related to Shakespeare, who is alleged to have visited the city of Rome twice during his life.

One critic states, "One cannot quite speak of a consensus among Shakespeare scholars on this point, though the reluctance of some to admit the possibility of Catholicism in Shakespeare's family is becoming harder to maintain." Other research by Jesuit scholars argues strongly against this speculation.

== Protestantism ==
In 1843, a presentation of Shakesperean religious extracts was published by Sir Frederick Beilby Watson and Frederic Dan Huntington as the Religious and Moral Sentences Culled from the Works of Shakespeare, Compared with Sacred Passages Drawn from Holy Writ. This was an early work that, in contrast to Catholic-directed studies, sought for Protestant and biblical allusions in the works of the writer. In Watson's words, this was carried out "by proving from Shakespeare's own writings, that he lived and died as a true protestant," collecting "presumptive evidence that the tenets of the religion which he professed were not of the Roman Catholic persuasion."

A century later, Shakespeare editor and historian A. L. Rowse wrote a biography of Shakespeare where, similarly, he firmly asserted that the writer was not a secret Catholic, but a Protestant: "He was an orthodox, confirming member of the Church into which he had been baptised, was brought up and married, in which his children were reared and in whose arms he at length was buried". Shakespeare had also become the godfather of William Walker in the Church of England, and he remembered his godson in his will with twenty shillings.

Rowse identifies anti-Catholic sentiment in Sonnet 124, taking "the fools of time" in the last lines of this sonnet, "To this I witness call the fools of time, / Which die for goodness who have lived for crime", to refer to the many Jesuits who were executed for treason in the years 1594–95. In regard to this, John Klause of Hofstra University accepts that Shakespeare intended "the fools of time" in the sonnet to represent executed Jesuits, but contends that the poet, by alluding to executed Jesuit Robert Southwell's Epistle of Comfort and its glorification of martyrdom, sympathises with them. Klause maintains that Southwell's influence is also identifiable in Titus Andronicus. A later assessment places Klause's interpretation as "against most recent trends".

Notwithstanding Pearce's identification (above) of Shakespeare's King John as a reworking of The Troublesome Reign of King John, made to refute its anti-Catholic bias, strong examples of Protestant sympathies, such as the denouncement of the Pope as an "unworthy and ridiculous ... Italian priest" with "usurped authority", remain in the text.

Yale's David Kastan sees no inconsistency in a Protestant dramatist lampooning the martyr Oldcastle in the play Henry IV (above): a contemporary audience would have identified Shakespeare's unsympathetic portrayal as a proof of his Protestantism because the knight's Lollardry was in the author's time identified with Puritanism, by then abhorred for undermining the established church.

Stephen Greenblatt acknowledges the convention that the "equivocator" arriving at the gate of hell in the Porter's speech in Macbeth is a reference to the Jesuit Father Henry Garnet, who had been executed in 1606. He argues that Shakespeare probably included the allusion for the sake of topicality, trusting that his audience would have heard of Garnet's pamphlet on equivocation, and not from any hidden sympathy for the man or his cause – indeed the portrait is not a sympathetic one. Literary editor Bishop Warburton declared that in the mind of Jacobean playgoers the policy of equivocation, adopted as an official doctrine of the Jesuits, would have been a direct reminder of Catholic treason in the "Gunpowder Plot". Shakespeare may have also been aware of the "equivocation" concept which appeared as the subject of a 1583 tract by Queen Elizabeth's chief councillor Lord Burghley, and the 1584 Doctrine of Equivocation by the Spanish prelate Martin Azpilcueta that was disseminated across Europe and into England in the 1590s.

Perhaps Shakespeare's most direct reference in the plays to contemporary religious issues comes at the birth of Queen Elizabeth in Henry VIII, during whose reign, as the character Archbishop Cranmer, architect of the reformation, predicts: "God shall be truly known". The playwright John Fletcher was a collaborator in the work, however, and may have written the speech.

One perspective is that to deduce from the evidence a definite Anglican Shakespeare is to misapprehend the religious circumstances of the time, the word "Anglican" not existing until nearly two decades after the writer's death and contemporary historians not recognising Anglicanism as a firm organisation or religious identity during his lifetime. In a similar vein, Maurice Hunt, Jean-Christophe Mayer and others have written of a Shakespeare with a syncretic or hybrid faith, in some sense both Catholic and Protestant. Anthony Nuttall argues Shakespeare's work defies identification of precise religious influences because Shakespeare's ranging and restless mind played with many ideas, alternately promoting and challenging assumptions throughout the plays; in Measure for Measure, Nuttall finds evidence of experimentation with heretical Gnostic theology. However, Eamon Duffy points out that although the majority of Tudor people were muddled and uncertain, accepting of compromise and accommodation, "Religious diversity was not a notion to conjure with in Tudor England. …Ritual and doctrinal diversity were evils, aspects of social and religious disunity."

Other scholars who have searched for Protestant rhetoric in Shakespeare's writings include Maurice Hunt (Baylor University), E. Beatrice Batson (Wheaton College), and Joseph William Sterrett (Aarhus University), the last of which insists that Shakespeare promoted religious tolerance in his writings. Shakespeare scholars such as Eric Sams and Robert Miola disagree with the traditional position that Shakespeare was a member of the established Anglican Church.

=== Shakespeare's will ===
Beilby Watson (1843) as well as John Donnan Countermine (1906) argued that Shakespeare's religious beliefs could be studied taking into account his will, which states:

In the name of God, Amen. I, William Shakespeare .., in perfect health and memory, God be praised, do make and ordain this my last will and testament in manner and form following. That is to say, first, I commend my soul into the hands of God my Creator, hoping and assuredly believing, through the only merits of Jesus Christ my Saviour, to be made partaker of life everlasting, and my body to the earth whereof it is made.

— Shakespeare's last will and testament, 25 March 1616

In the opinion of David Kastan, "this is as close as we can get to an expression of [Shakespeare's] own belief, and might well be taken as conclusive evidence". A. L. Rowse (2013), for instance, insisted that the statement in Shakespeare's will shows a conformist position to Protestant religion. Kastan discusses how some might see the phrase "through thonlie merittes of Jesus Christe" as a reference to the doctrine of solus Christus, but at the same time he argues that the expression "might have become merely conventional by 1616, and have little or any theological import". Thus, he asserts that this can hardly be considered as an ultimate evidence to define Shakespeare's religious affiliation, since the preamble was formulaic in the epoch.

== Atheism ==
Shakespeare's Christianity is not universally accepted. William John Birch in 1848 suggested that Shakespeare could have been an atheist, based on his interpretation of sentiments expressed in the works. His theory was not accepted by other scholars and his contemporary H. H. Furness dismissed it as a "rare tissue of perverted ingenuity". Some evidence used to support this thesis, however, was suggested by John Payne Collier, a notorious forger of historical documents, who examined the records of St Saviour's, Southwark, and found that Shakespeare, alone among his fellow Globe actors, was not shown as a churchgoer. Joseph Pearce again explains this as evidence of recusancy, rather than evidence of atheism. Herbert Thurston, writing in the 1912 edition of the Catholic Encyclopedia, questioned not only Shakespeare's Catholicism, but pondered "whether Shakespeare was not infected with the atheism, which, as we know from the testimony of writers as opposite in spirit as Thomas Nashe and [Robert] Persons, was rampant in the more cultured society of the Elizabethan age."

In a 1947 essay, George Orwell wrote that

The morality of Shakespeare's later tragedies is not religious in the ordinary sense, and certainly is not Christian. Only two of them, Hamlet and Othello, are supposedly occurring inside the Christian era, and even in those, apart from the antics of the ghost in Hamlet, there is no indication of a ‘next world’ where everything is to be put right. ...We do not know a great deal about Shakespeare's religious beliefs, and from the evidence of his writings it would be difficult to prove that he had any.

Russian Shakespeare scholar Vadim Nikolayev has stated "that Shakespeare put forward anti-church ideas and did not consider suicide to be a sin", that he "skillfully avoided conflicts with censorship". Nikolayev presented these theories in 2008, at an international conference; it caused intense discussion, though the majority of participants disagreed.

== Paganism ==
As flies to wanton boys are we to th' gods. They kill us for their sport.
—The Earl of Gloucester in King Lear, Act 4 Scene 1

Shakespeare's very frequent references to Paganistic gods and concepts, such as Hymen bringing about the resolution of As You Like It, are not a reflection of his own belief but a necessary device to present deity on stage, where Christian figures were, in contrast to the presentation of the mystery plays of earlier times, prohibited. Some commonplace Christian allusions, involving no physical manifestation of religion, in Quarto editions of the history cycle, were replaced with harmless references to pagan gods when the First Folio appeared.

== Views on Islam ==
Shakespeare's knowledge of Islam, according to a commentator writing in The Economist, was "sparse", yet he uses the religious inspiration delivered to the prophet Muhammad to make comparison with the visions experienced by the Catholic Joan la Pucelle (Joan of Arc) in Henry VI Part One: here "Shakespeare appropriates Islam for Protestant causes." Nonetheless, the writer asserts, Shakespeare was "ahead of his time in his sensitivity to the Islamic world and its inhabitants." According to academic Matthew Dimmock, Shakespeare's depiction of Islam "… does not bind […] the status of Mahomet to infamy."

Shakespeare had knowledge of Islam through his awareness of the Muslim hegemony in Spain, only recently relinquished, where Islamic caliphs had ruled the country for hundreds of years. In drama, his contemporary Christopher Marlowe's protagonist in Tamburlaine was a worshipper of "Mohomet", and the servant Ithamore is one of several Muslim characters in his The Jew of Malta. The 1600 visit to London of Abd el-Ouahed ben Messaoud, the ambassador from the Sultan of Morocco with his train, had aroused curiosity and great interest.

Two of Shakespeare’s characters were "Moors", (Note: The "Moor" Aaron in Titus Andronicus is a character from classical Rome, pre-dating Islam.) a term extended from its original meaning of an inhabitant of Morocco also to include someone from the islamic Ottoman Caliphate. The Prince of Morocco was an unsuccessful wooer to Portia in The Merchant of Venice. Othello, the Moor of Venice, converted to Christianity to become a general in the army of Venice. Shakespeare's one explicit reference to Muhammad, in Henry VI (see above) demonstrates a knowledge of the contemporary fable that Muhammad had trained a dove to nibble grain from his ear, rather than any insight into Islam.
