= Biblical allusions in Shakespeare =

Bible references by the English playwright

According to Dr. Naseeb Shaheen, Shakespeare, in writing his plays, "seldom borrows biblical references from his sources, even when those sources contain many references." Roy Battenhouse notes that the Shakespearean tragedy "frequently echoes Bible language or paradigm, even when the play's setting is pagan." Similarly, Peter Milward notes that despite their secular appearance, Shakespeare's plays "conceal an undercurrent of religious meaning which belongs to their deepest essence." Further, Milward maintains that although Shakespeare "may have felt obliged by the circumstances of the Elizabethan stage to avoid Biblical or other religious subjects for his plays," such obligation "did not prevent him from making full use of the Bible in dramatizing his secular sources and thus infusing into them a Biblical meaning." Milward continues that, in writing his plays (in particular, the tragedies), Shakespeare "shows the universal relevance of the Bible both to the reality of human life 'in this harsh world' and to its ideal in the heart of God." Steven Marx suggests "a thorough familiarity with the Scriptures" is a prerequisite to understanding the Biblical references in the plays, and that the plays' references to the Bible "illuminate fresh and surprising meanings in the biblical text." Marx further notes that "it is possible that Shakespeare sometimes regarded his own role of playwright and performer as godlike, his own book as potent and capacious as 'The Book'." As a recent study points out, "The diversity of versions reflected in Shakespeare's writing indicates that 'Shakespeare's Bible' cannot be taken for granted as unitary, since it consists of a network of different translations".

== Specific examples ==
- In 2 Henry VI, Shakespeare suggests his own biblical verses. Per Shaheen:
  - "The many biblical references that occur throughout the play are Shakespeare's own. Shakespeare's use of Scripture in the play can be seen in the way he drew the character of the king. [Edward] Hall depicts Henry as 'a man of a meke spirite, and of a simple witte, preferryng peace before warre, reste before businesse, honestie before profite, and quietnesse before laboure…. There could be none, more chaste, more meke, more holy, nor a better creature…. He gaped not for honor, nor thirsted for riches, but studied onely for the health of his soule: the savyng wherof, he estemed to bee the greatest wisedome' [Union of the Two Noble and Illustre Famelies of Lancastre and Yorke, first published in 1548] (3.105). But Hall makes no biblical references when depicting Henry as a meek, pious ruler, void of ambition. Shakespeare, however, gives the entire play a religious cast, and puts many biblical references and religious expressions in the mouths of his characters."
  - "Some of these religious utterances strongly suggest Scripture, but do not seem to be biblical references." Shaheen notes for example the lines "O Lord, that lends me life, Lend me a heart replete with thankfulness!" (1.1.19–20) and "God's goodness hath been great to thee. Let never day nor night unhallowed pass, But still remember what the Lord hath done." (2.1.82–84) contain "strong overtones of Scripture, but no actual references seem to be involved. The play contains many similar passages that are difficult to deal with, passages that are best classified as religious sentiments rather than actual biblical references."
- In 3 Henry VI, Shakespeare took a biblical theme from a prior source and expanded its usage of biblical references. Per Shaheen:
  - "[Edward] Hall's theme [per his Union of the Two Noble and Illustre Famelies of Lancastre and Yorke, first published in 1548] was moral. He sought to demonstrate God's providence towards England, and repeatedly points out that those who commit evil will sooner or later be punished. Yet his account contains very few biblical references. Inspired by Hall's theme of divine retribution, Shakespeare adds biblical references that reflect that theme (1.4.168 "My blood upon your heads!"; 2.2.129 "Their blood upon thy head."; 2.6.55 "Measure for measure must be answered.")."
  - "An example of how Shakespeare added biblical references to what he found in his sources can be seen in the passage in Hall relating the death of Warwick's brother. Hall simply says: 'He [Lord Fitzwater] was slayne, and with hym the Bastard of Salisbury, brother to the erle of Warwycke, a valeaunt yong gentelman.' (3.181). In 2.3.14–23 Shakespeare expands that statement into a passage that contains at least three biblical references:"
    - 2.3.15: Thy brother's blood the thirsty earth hath drunk. (Genesis 4.10–11)
    - 2.3.17: And in the very pangs of death he cried. (Compare 2 Samuel 22.5)
    - 2.3.22: [Possible biblical reference] "gave up the ghost" (Genesis 49.33; Compare also Genesis 35.18; Matthew 27.50; Acts 5.10)
    - 2.3.23: Then let the earth be drunken with our blood! (Per Shaheen, "A common biblical expression." Compare Judith 6.4; Isaiah 49.26; Revelation 17.6. Compare also Deuteronomy 32.42; Jeremiah 46.10; Ezekiel 39.19)
- In Henry V, Shakespeare adds biblical themes to his prior sources. Per Shaheen: "[T]here is nothing in any of Shakespeare's sources that is parallel to Henry's discussion on the responsibility for war and the fate of the soldiers who die therein (4.1.124-91), or to Henry's musings on kingship (4.1.230-84), which contain a large number of biblical and liturgical references. These passages with their references are original with Shakespeare."
- Per Shaheen, "Shakespeare's use of the book of Revelation in Antony and Cleopatra is outstanding…. Since only three chapters of Revelation were read during Morning and Evening Prayer in the Church of England (…[reference to chapters and church days]…), Shakespeare must have privately read much of Revelation shortly before or during the composition of the play." He further states, "The references to Exodus in act 3 scene 13 are also noteworthy."
- Per Shaheen, Timon of Athens "provides rare insights into his manner of composition and has several biblical references that are of considerable interest." He further states, "As is Shakespeare's custom throughout his plays, his use of Scripture in Timon is primarily intended to serve dramatic ends rather than to have theological significance."
- In Macbeth, Act IV, Scene iii, Macduff offers his assistance to Malcolm, saying, "Thy royal father / Was a most sainted king; the queen that bore thee, / Oftener upon her knees than on her feet / Died every day she lived." The last part is a direct allusion to 1 Corinthians 15, verse 31: "I affirm, by the boasting in you which I have in Christ Jesus our Lord, I die daily."

All of the foregoing examples as provided by Shaheen suggest that Shakespeare was well-acquainted with the Bible and its various themes via individual verses spread throughout its various chapters enough so that he could easily expand upon any said theme with his own continuation of such verses.

== Versions of the Bible used by Shakespeare ==
=== Geneva Bible ===
R. A. L. Burnet states: "[A]s Professor E. P. Dickie has pointed out to me, words found in the margin [of the Geneva Bible] will not have circulated very readily nor become proverbial sayings. Shakespeare would not have heard these words either in church or in conversation; he could only have read them."

=== Rheims New Testament ===
Although Naseeb Shaheen's important study calls attention to three references to the Rheims translation of the New Testament, it overlooks a number of other allusions or correspondences. For example, Matthew 3.2 is translated in the Tyndale, Geneva, Great and Bishops' translations as "Repent: for the kingdom of heaven is at hand," but in the Rheims translation it is "Do penance: for the kingdom of heaven is at hand." This significant difference in translation, of importance for the Catholic sacrament of penance and the theological notion of satisfaction for sins, occurs numerous times in the Rheims New Testament and nineteen times in Shakespeare's plays. There are some seventy other possible references, according to David Beauregard.

== See also ==
- The quick and the dead § Shakespeare's Hamlet

== Bibliography ==
- Abend, Murray. "Some Biblical Influences in Shakespeare's Plays" Notes and Queries CXCV (23 Dec 1950): 554–8.
- Ackermann, Carl. The Bible in Shakespeare Columbus, Ohio: The Lutheran Book Concern, n.d.
- Anders, Henry R. D. "Chapter 6: The Bible and the Prayer Book" Shakespeare's Books: A Dissertation on Shakespeare's Reading and the Immediate Sources of His Works Berlin: Georg Reimer, 1904.
- Batson, Beatrice ed. Shakespeare's Christianity: The Protestant and Catholic Poetics of Julius Caesar, Macbeth and Hamlet Waco, Texas: Baylor University Press, 2006.
- Batson, Beatrice ed. Word and Rite: The Bible and Ceremony in Selected Shakespearean Works Newcastle upon Tyne: Cambridge Scholars Publishing, 2010.
- Battenhouse, Roy ed. Shakespeare's Christian Dimension: An Anthology of Commentary Bloomington: Indiana University Press, 1994.
- Beauregard, David. "Shakespeare and the Rheims New Testament (1582): Old Claims and New Evidence" Renascence XLVII.2 (2015), 107–26.
- Bullock, Charles. Shakespeare's Debt to the Bible London: Hand and Heart Publishing Offices, 1879.
- Burgess, William. The Bible in Shakespeare: A Study of the Relation of the Works of William Shakespeare to the Bible New York: Thomas Y. Crowell Company, 1903.
- Burnet, R. A. L. "A Further Echo of Gilby's 'Commentary on Micah' in Macbeth" Notes and Queries 29(2) (Apr 1982): 123–4.
- Burnet, R. A. L. "Macbeth's 'I Have Lived Long Enough': A Gilby Echo?" Notes and Queries 27(2) (Apr 1980): 181.
- Burnet, R. A. L. "Shakespeare and the First Seven Chapters of the Genevan Job" Notes and Queries 29(2) (Apr 1982): 127–8.
- Burnet, R. A. L. "Shakespeare and the Marginalia of the Geneva Bible" Notes and Queries 26(2) (Apr 1979): 113–4.
- Burnet, R. A. L. "Some Echoes of the Genevan Bible in Shakespeare and Milton" Notes and Queries 27(2) (Apr 1980): 179–81.
- Burnet, R. A. L. "Two Further Echoes of the Genevan Margin in Shakespeare and Milton" Notes and Queries 28(2) (Apr 1981): 129.
- Carter, Thomas. Shakespeare and Holy Scripture: With the Version He Used London: Hodder and Stroughton, 1905.
- Coleman, Hamilton. Shakespeare and the Bible New York: Vantage Press Inc., 1955.
- Colton, Garden Quincy; ed. and enhanced by Giovanni A. Orlando. Shakespeare and the Bible Future Technologies, Inc., 2011–2012.
- DeCook, Travis and Alan Galey ed. Shakespeare, the Bible, and the Form of the Book: Contested Scriptures New York: Routledge, Taylor & Francis Group, 2012.
- Eaton, T[homas] R[ay]. Shakespeare and the Bible London: James Blackwood, 1858.
- Ellis, Charles. Shakespeare and the Bible: Sonnets with their Scriptural Harmonies n.p., 1896.
- Fisch, Harold. The Biblical Presence in Shakespeare, Milton and Blake: A Comparative Study Oxford University Press, 1999.
- Frye, Roland Mushat. Shakespeare and Christian Doctrine Princeton, New Jersey: Princeton University Press, 1963.
- Groves, Beatrice. "Shakespeare's Sonnets and the Genevan Marginalia" Essays in Criticism 57(2) (Apr 2007): 114–28.
- Groves, Beatrice. Texts and Traditions: Religion in Shakespeare 1592–1604 Oxford University Press, 2007.
- Groves, Beatrice. "'The Wittiest Partition': Bottom, Paul, and Comedic Resurrection" Notes and Queries 54(3) (Sep 2007): 277–82.
- Hall, Grace R. W. The Tempest as Mystery Play: Uncovering Religious Sources of Shakespeare's Most Spiritual Work Jefferson, North Carolina: McFarland & Company, Inc., 1999.
- Hamlin, Hannibal. The Bible in Shakespeare Oxford University Press, 2013.
- Hankins, John Erskine. Shakespeare's Derived Imagery University of Kansas Press, 1953; reprinted 1967; 2nd Octagon printing New York: Octagon Books, 1977.
- Hassel, Chris R. Jr. Shakespeare's Religious Language: A Dictionary New York: Continuum, 2005.
- Henley, William Ernest. English Lyrics: Chaucer to Poe, 1340–1809 n.p., 1897; 2nd ed. London, 1905. [Shakespeare is given 11 pages for 22 lyrics]
- Huntington, Frederic D. Religious and Moral Sentences culled from the Works of Shakespeare, compared with Sacred Passages drawn from Holy Writ n.p., 1859.
- Jaeger, Ronald W. "A Biblical Allusion in Shakespeare's Sonnet 154" Notes and Queries 19(4) (Apr 1972): 125.
- Malcolm, W. H. Shakspere and Holy Writ London: Marcus Ward & Co., Limited, n.d.
- Marx, Steven. Shakespeare and the Bible Oxford University Press, 2000.
- Milward, Peter. Biblical Influences in Shakespeare's Great Tragedies Bloomington, Indiana: Indiana University Press, 1987.
- Milward, Peter. Biblical Themes in Shakespeare: Centring on King Lear Tokyo, Japan: The Renaissance Institute, 1975.
- Milward, Peter. Shakespeare's Religious Background Chicago: Loyola University Press, 1973.
- Moore, Peter R. "A Biblical Echo in Romeo and Juliet" Notes and Queries 51(3) (Sep 2004): 278–9.
- Nicholson, B[rinsley]. "Shakespeare and the Bible" Notes and Queries s3-IX(212) (20 Jan 1866): 55–6.
- Nicholson, Brinsley. "Shakespeare and the Bible" Notes and Queries s4-I(16) (18 Apr 1868): 368–70.
- Noble, Richmond. Shakespeare's Biblical Knowledge and Use of the Book of Common Prayer as Exemplified in the Plays of the First Folio Society for Promoting Christian Knowledge, 1935; reprinted Octagon Books, 1970.
- Pearce, Joseph. Through Shakespeare's Eyes: Seeing the Catholic Presence in the Plays San Francisco: Ignatius Press, 2010.
- Rees, James. Shakespeare and the Bible Philadelphia: Claxton, Remsen & Haffelfinger, 1876.
- Seiss, J. A. "The influence of the Bible on literature" The Evangelical Review 27, Jul 1853, 1–17. [parallels in Portia's speech on 'the quality of mercy']
- Selkirk, James Brown. Bible Truths with Shakspearean Parallels: Being Selections from Scripture, Moral, Doctrinal, and Preceptial, with Passages Illustrative of the Text, from the Writings of Shakspeare London: Whittaker and Co., 1862.
- Shaheen, Naseeb. Biblical References in Shakespeare's History Plays, Newark: University of Delaware Press, (1989), ISBN 978-0-87413-341-7.
- Shaheen, Naseeb. Biblical References in Shakespeare's Plays Newark: University of Delaware Press, 1999, ISBN 978-0-87413-677-7. "This volume provides a survey of the English Bibles of Shakespeare's day, notes their similarities and differences, and indicates which version the playwright knew best. The biblical references in each of Shakespeare's plays are then analyzed, as are his references to the Prayer Book and the homilies. The question of what constitutes a valid biblical reference is also discussed."
- Shaheen, Naseeb. Biblical References in Shakespeare's Plays Newark: University of Delaware Press, 2011, ISBN 978-1-61149-358-0.
- Shaheen, Naseeb. Biblical References in Shakespeare's Tragedies, Newark: University of Delaware Press, (1987) ISBN 978-0-87413-293-9.
- Shaheen, Naseeb. "Henry V and Its Quartos" Shakespeare Newsletter (Fall 2007) 57 (2): 43–48.
- Shaheen, Naseeb. "A Note on Troilus and Cressida, II.iii.1–37" Notes and Queries 44(4) (Dec 1997): 503–5.
- Shaheen, Naseeb. "Ruth 3:15 – The 'He' and 'She' Bibles" Notes and Queries 56(4) (Dec 2009): 621–4.
- Shaheen, Naseeb. "Shakespeare and the Authorized Version" Notes and Queries 45(3) (Sep 1998): 343–5.
- Shaheen, Naseeb. "Shakespeare and the Bishops' Bible" Notes and Queries 47(1) (Mar 2000): 94–7.
- Shaheen, Naseeb. "Shakespeare and the Rheims New Testament" American Notes & Queries (Jan/Feb 1984) 22 (5/6): 70.
- Shaheen, Naseeb. "Shakespeare and the Tomson New Testament" Notes and Queries 42(3) (Sep 1995): 290–1.
- Shaheen, Naseeb. "Shakespeare's Knowledge of the Bible – How Acquired" Shakespeare Studies Vol. 20, (1988): 201.
- Shaheen, Naseeb. "Shakespeare's Knowledge of Italian" Shakespeare Survey (1994) 47: 161. "Studies the Italian narrative sources of William Shakespeare's plays. Shakespeare's acquaintance with John Florio's language manuals; Adherence of Shakespeare's plays to his Italian sources; Evidence in `The Merchant of Venice.'"
- Shaheen, Naseeb. "Shakespeare's Sonnet 146" English Language Notes (Jun 2004) 41 (4): 15–19.
- Shaheen, Naseeb. "The Taverner Bible, Jugge's Edition of Tyndale, and Shakespeare" English Language Notes (Dec 2000) 38 (2): 24.
- Shaheen, Naseeb. "'Trifles Light as Air': A Note on Othello, III.iii.313" Notes and Queries 27(2) (Apr 1980): 169–70.
- Shaheen, Naseeb. "A Young Scholar from Rheims" English Language Notes (Mar 1993) 30 (3): 7.
- Sherbo, Arthur. "More on the Bible in Shakespeare" Notes and Queries 56(2) (Jun 2009): 270–4.
- Sim, James H. Dramatic Uses of Biblical Allusions in Marlowe and Shakespeare, Gainesville: University of Florida Press, 1966.
- Slater, Ann Pasternak. "Variations Within a Source: from Isaiah xxix to 'The Tempest'"" Shakespeare Survey: An Annual Survey of Shakespearian Study and Production 25, Cambridge University Press, 1972, 125–35.
- Stritmatter, Roger. "The Heavenly Treasure of Sonnets 48 and 52" Notes and Queries 46(2) (Jun 1999): 226–8.
- Stritmatter, Roger. "The Influence of a Genevan Note from Romans 7:19 on Shakespeare's Sonnet 151" Notes and Queries 44(4) (Dec 1997): 514–6.
- Stritmatter, Roger A. The Marginalia of Edward de Vere's Geneva Bible: Providential Discovery, Literary Reasoning, and Historical Consequence Feb 2001.
- Stritmatter, Roger. "A New Biblical Source for Shakespeare's Concept of 'All Seeing Heaven'" Notes and Queries 46(2) (Jun 1999): 207–9.
- Stritmatter, Roger. "'Old' and 'New' Law in The Merchant of Venice: A Note on the Source of Shylock's Morality in Deuteronomy 15" Notes and Queries 47 (1) (2000): 70–72.
- Stritmatter, Roger. "By Providence Divine: Shakespeare's Awareness of Some Geneva Marginal Notes of I Samuel" Notes and Queries 47(1) (Mar 2000): 97–100.
- Stritmatter, Roger. "The Biblical Source of Harry of Cornwall's Theological Doctrine" Notes and Queries 48 (3) (2001): 280–282.
- Stritmatter, Roger. "Shakespeare's Ecclesiasticus 28.2–5: A Biblical Source for Ariel's Doctrine of Mercy" Notes and Queries 56(1) (Mar 2009): 67–70.
- Stritmatter, Roger. "Revelations 14:13 and Hamlet I.v.91–108: 'Write, Blessed are the Dead!'" Notes and Queries 60 (3) (2013): 415–418.
- Stritmatter, Roger. "'My Name Be Buried Where My Body Is': The Influence of Ecclesiasticus 41 on Sonnets 71–74" Notes and Queries 62 (4) (2015): 583–586.
- Swinburne, Charles Alfred. Sacred & Shakesperian Affinities: Being Analogies Between the Writings of the Psalmists and of Shakespeare 1890, reprinted New York: Haskell House Publishers Ltd., 1971.
- Timmins, J. F. The Poet-Priest: Shakespearian Sermons Compiled for the Use of Students and Public Readers 1884.
- Waugaman, Richard M. "Psalm Echoes in Shakespeare's 1 Henry VI, Richard II, and Edward III" Notes and Queries 57(3) (Jun 2010): 359–64.
- Waugaman, Richard M. "The Sternhold and Hopkins Whole Book of Psalms is a Major Source for the Works of Shakespeare" Notes and Queries 56(4) (Dec 2009): 595–604.
- Wordsworth, Charles. Shakespeare's Knowledge and Use of the Bible London 1864, 4th ed. revised London: Eden, Remington & Co. Publishers, 1892.

Zinman, Ira, ed. (2009).Shakespeare's Sonnets and the Bible. foreword by HRM Charles the Third, by the Grace of God of the United Kingdom of Great Britain and Northern Ireland and of His other Realms and Territories. Bloomington. World Wisdom. ISBN 978-1933316758
