= Sonnet 123 =

« » Sonnet 123
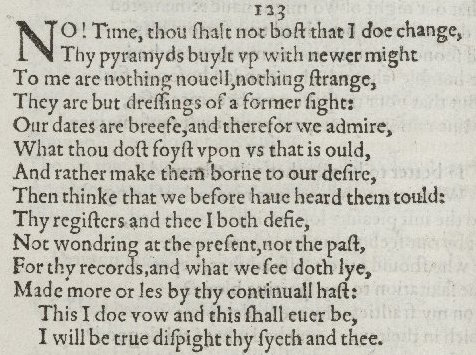
- Sonnet 123 in the 1609 Quarto
Q1
Q2
Q3
C
No, Time, thou shalt not boast that I do change:
Thy pyramids built up with newer might
To me are nothing novel, nothing strange;
They are but dressings of a former sight.
Our dates are brief, and therefore we admire
What thou dost foist upon us that is old;
And rather make them born to our desire
Than think that we before have heard them told.
Thy registers and thee I both defy,
Not wondering at the present nor the past,
For thy records and what we see doth lie,
Made more or less by thy continual haste.
This I do vow, and this shall ever be,
I will be true, despite thy scythe and thee.
—William Shakespeare
4
8
12
14

Sonnet 123 is one of 154 sonnets written by the English playwright and poet William Shakespeare. It is a member of the Fair Youth sequence, in which the poet expresses his love towards a young man.

== Structure ==
Sonnet 123 is an English or Shakespearean sonnet. The English sonnet has three quatrains, followed by a final rhyming couplet. It follows the typical rhyme scheme of the form ABAB CDCD EFEF GG and is composed in iambic pentameter, a type of poetic metre based on five pairs of metrically weak/strong syllabic positions. The 3rd line exemplifies a regular iambic pentameter:

 ×  / ×    /  ×    / ×    /  ×      / 
To me are nothing novel, nothing strange; (123.3)

/ = ictus, a metrically strong syllabic position. × = nonictus.

Although every line may be scanned regularly, some lines may be otherwise construed, such as line 13 which can be read with an initial reversal:

  /  ×  ×  /   ×     /    ×   / ×   / 
This I do vow, and this shall ever be, (123.13)

The meter demands a few variant pronunciations: line 10's "wondering" functions as two syllables, and line 12's "continual" as three; line 11's "records" (although it is a noun, not a verb) is to be stressed on the second syllable.

== Analysis ==
Shakespeare addresses the ideas of change and growth in one's lifetime by metaphorically standing up against time Father Time. The major theme is that years continue to pass and the narrator is naturally getting older with each passing year, but he does not feel that it is necessary for his character to change accordingly. There are changes in the physical world that may happen within one's lifetime (pyramids), but that is not substantial on a personal level. Even so, we ought to respect what was done before us; however, that does not mean we have to revere it and at the same time an individual's pride would persuade one to think of these ideas as one's own, rather than something merely copied from the past (lines 5–8). There is little point in worrying about what has already happened, or for that matter worrying about what is happening now, but one should just live one's life for what it is. Copying down events and comparing written records with mental recollection is pointless because it wastes time in the present to do so, and time is continually moving (lines 9–12). Finally, the narrator resolves that no matter what happens in life (as new events to come are "done" by Time) he will stick to his own constitution and be true to himself regardless of what any consequences may be.

There are numerous other takes on the sonnet ranging from the poem's use of time (or lack thereof) as a metaphor for the tyranny of post-modernist working life as well as the potential sociopolitical themes apparent in the poem's thematic fear of change (conservatism).

This sonnet is one of the few pieces in Shakespeare that references ideas such as time, change, and death without the use of direct biblical or literary allusion.
