= George Rodrigue =

American painter

- Born: March 13, 1944; New Iberia, Louisiana, United States
- Died: December 14, 2013 (aged 69); Houston, Texas, United States
- Education: University of Louisiana at Lafayette, Art Center College of Design
- Known for: Painter

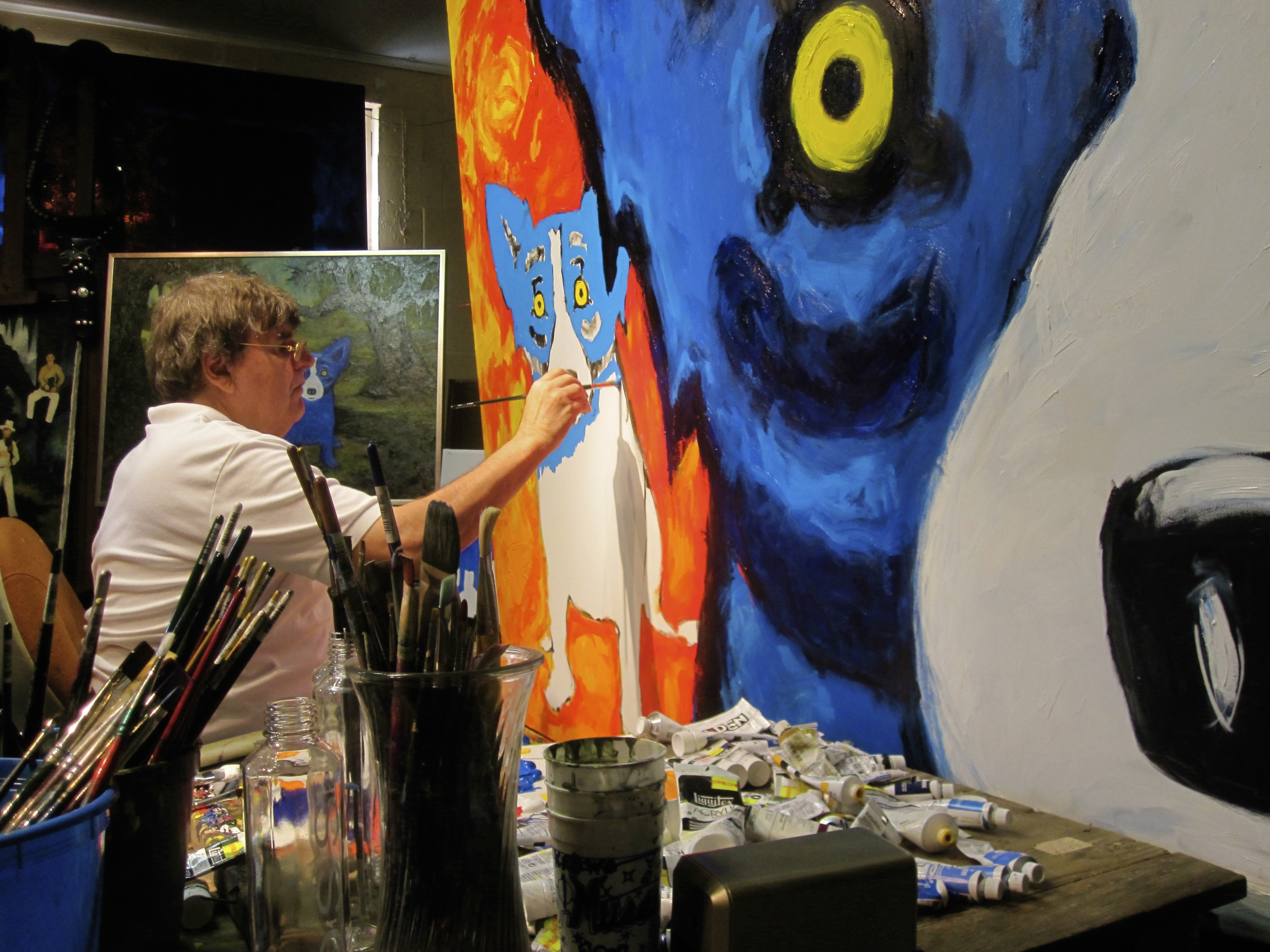
Rodrigue in his studio in 2009

George Rodrigue (March 13, 1944 – December 14, 2013) was an American artist who in the late 1960s began painting Louisiana landscapes, followed soon after by outdoor family gatherings and southwest Louisiana 19th-century and early 20th-century genre scenes. His paintings often include moss-clad oak trees, which are common to an area of French Louisiana known as Acadiana. In the mid-1990s Rodrigue's Blue Dog paintings, based on a Cajun legend called Rougarou, catapulted him to worldwide fame.

His funeral Mass was open to the public and held at St. Louis Cathedral in Jackson Square, New Orleans.

== Biography ==
Rodrigue was born March 13, 1944, in New Iberia, Louisiana. Rodrigue attended the Brothers of the Christian Schools all-male high school called St. Peter's College (now Catholic High School), which was located near St. Peter's Church, and near the banks of the Bayou Teche running through New Iberia. He formally studied art at the University of Louisiana at Lafayette (then named the University of Southwestern Louisiana) and the Art Center College of Design in Pasadena, California. He returned to Louisiana in the late 1960s, and became well known for his interpretations of Cajun subjects and landscapes, inspired by his roots.

Rodrigue's early notable works include The Aioli Dinner, which divides its time between the New Orleans Museum of Art and the Ogden Museum of Southern Art, and The Class of Marie Courrege, which won an honorable mention from Le Salon in Paris, France, 1975, prompting the French newspaper, Le Figaro, to dub Rodrigue "America's Rousseau." His most famous works include the Acadian heroine Evangeline, portrayed in Henry Wadsworth Longfellow's epic poem, "Evangeline: A Tale of Acadie" (1847), and the Cajun modern-day Evangeline, Jolie Blonde. He also designed three posters for the New Orleans Jazz & Heritage Festival, which feature portraits of Louis Armstrong, Pete Fountain and Al Hirt. Between 1985 and 1989, Rodrigue painted the Saga of the Acadians, a series of fifteen paintings chronicling the Acadian journey from France to Nova Scotia to Louisiana and ending with the official return visit to Grand Pré.

"The yellow eyes are really the soul of the dog. He has this piercing stare. People say the dog keeps talking to them with the eyes, always saying something different. People who have seen a Blue Dog painting always remember it. They are really about life, about mankind searching for answers. The dog never changes position. He just stares at you. And you’re looking at him, looking for some answers, ‘Why are we here?,’ and he's just looking back at you, wondering the same. The dog doesn't know. You can see this longing in his eyes, this longing for love, answers."
— Rodrigue on the Blue Dog

More recently and worldwide he is known for his creation of the Blue Dog series of paintings, featuring a blue-hued dog. He used the shape and stance of his deceased dog named Tiffany, and was primarily influenced by the loup-garou legend — the first painting in the series bears the title Watch Dog, painted for Bayou, a book of Louisiana ghost stories. The Blue Dog was made popular by Absolut Vodka in 1992, when Rodrigue was honored as an Absolut Vodka artist joining famous artists such as Andy Warhol and glass artist Hans Godo Frabel. The Blue Dog was used by both Absolut Vodka and the Xerox Corporation through national ad campaigns The ghostly blue spaniel/terrier is often featured with a white nose and yellow eyes.

Rodrigue has galleries in Carmel, California; Lafayette, Louisiana; and New Orleans, Louisiana. In 2007, the Dixon Gallery and Gardens hosted a 40-year Rodrigue retrospective exhibition, which traveled in 2008 to the New Orleans Museum of Art. Rodrigue was awarded an honorary doctorate at the University of Louisiana at Lafayette on May 17, 2009. In 2011 the Boy Scouts of America honored him with the Distinguished Eagle Award. In 2013 he received the Opus Award from the Ogden Museum of Southern Art.

In 2004, Rodrigue came to Shreveport with another incoming Democratic governor, Kathleen Blanco of Lafayette, with whom he made an appearance at the Louisiana State Exhibit Museum, where he autographed Hathaway's menu from more than twenty years earlier.

=== Death ===
In October 2013, George and his wife Wendy told the New Orleans Magazine that Rodrigue had been diagnosed in 2012 with Stage 4 lung cancer and that tumors had spread throughout his body. Rodrigue believed it could be linked to his spraying canvases with a toxic varnish inside an unventilated studio early in his career. On December 14, 2013, Rodrigue died at the age of 69. A mass was held on December 19 at St. Louis Cathedral in New Orleans.

== Response to Hurricane Katrina ==
Forced to relocate, Rodrigue temporarily moved his base of operations to Lafayette. Days after the disaster, he created We Will Rise Again, depicting the American flag covered with water, to benefit the Red Cross in response to Hurricane Katrina and the flooding of New Orleans. "The Blue Dog is partly submerged, and its eyes, normally yellow, are red with a broken heart," Rodrigue wrote in September 2005. "Like a ship's S.O.S., the red cross on the dog's chest calls out for help."

"We Will Rise Again" was the first of five works that the artist created for his new initiative, Blue Dog Relief: George Rodrigue Art Campaign for Recovery. To directly benefit the New Orleans Museum of Art, which was closed for six months due to flood damage, he also painted Throw Me Something FEMA and You Can't Drown the Blues.

Following those releases, Rodrigue launched a campaign for New Orleans levee protection. He sent prints of To Stay Alive We Need Levee 5 to every member of the U.S. Congress. Sales proceeds from silkscreen prints and related campaign materials — including T-shirts, lapel pins, bumper stickers and buttons — were donated to NOMA.

Rodrigue donated his Cut Through the Red Tape image to the United Way for use in promoting the Louisiana 2-1-1 phone system. Louisiana 2-1-1 (an easy-to-remember Information & Referral phone number) seeks to eliminate barriers to reaching human-service agencies — particularly in the wake of disasters such as Hurricane Katrina.

As of September 2006, the donation tally to Blue Dog Relief beneficiaries was $700,000, including a check for $100,000 that Rodrigue presented to NOMA on March 3, 2006, to help kick off its grand re-opening: "The HeART of New Orleans," a three-day weekend celebration of the arts.

== George Rodrigue Foundation of the Arts ==
In 2009, Rodrigue formed the George Rodrigue Foundation of the Arts (GRFA), a non-profit organization which advocates the importance of the visual arts in children's development. GRFA encourages the use of art within all curricula and supports a variety of art educational programs. Programs of the Rodrigue Foundation include an annual Scholarship Art Contest, and George's Art Closet, which donates art supplies to schools and Louisiana A+ Schools (LAA+). LAA+ trains hundreds of teachers annually in arts integration so that students can unlock their traditional subjects through the arts.

== Publications ==
- The Cajuns of George Rodrigue (Oxmoor House, 1976)
- A Couple of Local Boys: Paintings by George Rodrigue, Poetry by Gus Weill (Baton Rouge: Claitor's Publishing Division, 1981); Gus Weill is a political consultant and novelist originally from Lafayette, Louisiana, who resides in New York City.
- Le Petit Cajun: Conversations with André Rodrigue, from his son's perspective
- Bayou; text by Chris Segura, paintings by George Rodrigue (Inkwell, 1984)
- Blue Dog by George Rodrigue and Lawrence Freundlich (Viking / Penguin, 1994; a Book of the Month Club selection)
- George Rodrigue; A Cajun Artist (Penguin Studio, 1997)
- Blue Dog Man (foreword by Tom Brokaw, Stewart Tabori & Chang, 1999)
- A Blue Dog Christmas (Stewart Tabori & Chang, 2000)
- Blue Dog Love (Stewart Tabori & Chang, 2001)
- "Why is Blue Dog Blue?" (Abrams, 2002)
- The Art of George Rodrigue a 40-year retrospective by Ginger Danto & George Rodrigue, Harry N. Abrams, Inc. (November, 2003; revised 2012)
- Blue Dog Speaks (Sterling, 2008)
- George Rodrigue Prints: A Catalogue Raisonne (Abrams, 2008)
- Are You Blue Dog's Friend? (Abrams, 2009)
- The Other Side of the Painting (UL Press, 2013)
- Rodrigue: The Don Sanders Collection (Rodrigue Studio, 2015)

== Sundry titles ==
- The Loup-Garou of Côte Gelée by Morris Raphael, Harlo Press (June 1990); illustrator, George Rodrigue
- Claire by Moonlight by Lynne Kositsky, Tundra Books (April 12, 2005); cover painting: Traiteur by George Rodrigue
- Dog: 5000 years of the Dog in Art by Tamsin Pickeral (2010, Merrell Publishers); Rodrigue painting featured, with descriptive text
- Rascal: A Dog and His Boy by Ken Wells (2010, Knopf Books for Young Readers); cover painting by George Rodrigue
- A Unique Slant of Light: A Bicentennial History of Art in Louisiana edited by Michael Sartisky, J. Richard Gruber, John R. Kemp (2012, University Press of Mississippi); Rodrigue paintings featured, with descriptive text
