= Naseeb Shaheen =

American scholar (1931–2009)

Naseeb Azeez Shaheen (June 21, 1931 - September 26, 2009) was an American scholar who specialized in Biblical allusions in the work of Shakespeare.

Born in Chicago, he graduated in 1962 from the American University of Beirut in Lebanon with a Bachelor of Arts. In 1965, he received a Master of Arts and, in 1969, a Ph.D. in English Literature from the University of California at Los Angeles. Shaheen was a professor of English Literature at the University of Memphis. His course work included Shakespeare, English Renaissance Literature, and The Bible as Literature.

Shaheen authored four books on the biblical allusions in Shakespeare's plays: tragedies (1987); histories (1989); comedies (1993); a selection of plays (Biblical References in Shakespeare's Plays, 1999).

== Selected works ==
- "Of Oreb, or Of Sinai" English Language Notes (Sep 1971) 9 (1): 25-28.
- "Spenser and the New Testament" American Notes & Queries (Sep 1971) 10 (1): 4.
- "Milton's Muse and the De Doctrina" Milton Quarterly (Oct 1974) 8 (3): 72-76.
- Biblical References in The Faerie Queene, Memphis State University Press (1976).
- "Binder Unbound, Or, How Not to Convert the Jews" Studies in Short Fiction (Summer 1976) 13 (3): 376.
- "Butler's Use of Scripture in the Way of All Flesh" Essays in Literature (Spring 1978) 5 (1): 39-51.
- “Like the Base Judean” Shakespeare Quarterly Vol. 31, No. 1 (Spring, 1980), pp. 93-95.
- "‘Trifles Light as Air': A Note on Othello, III. iii. 313" Notes and Queries (1980) 27 (2): 169-170.
- "A Warning for Fair Women and the Ur-Hamlet" Notes and Queries (1983) 30 (2): 126-127.
- "Misconceptions about the Geneva Bible" Studies in Bibliography Vol. 37, (1984), pp. 156–158.
- "Shakespeare and the Rheims New Testament" American Notes & Queries (Jan/Feb 1984) 22 (5/6): 70.
- "The Incest Theme in Hamlet" Notes and Queries (1985) 32 (1): 51-a-51.
- "Shakespeare and the True Tragedy of Richard the Third" Notes and Queries (1985) 32 (1): 32-33.
- "Shakespeare and the Geneva Bible: "Hamlet", I.iii.54" Studies in Bibliography Vol. 38, (1985), pp. 201–203.
- Biblical References in Shakespeare's Tragedies, Newark: University of Delaware Press, (1987) ISBN 978-0-87413-293-9.
- "Shakespeare's Knowledge of the Bible - How Acquired" Shakespeare Studies Vol. 20, (1988), p. 201.
- Biblical References in Shakespeare's History Plays, Newark: University of Delaware Press, (1989), ISBN 978-0-87413-341-7.
- "Biblical References in Love's Labour's Lost" Notes and Queries (1991) 38 (1): 55-56.
- "Shylock's ‘Abram’ in The Merchant of Venice" Notes and Queries (1991) 38 (1): 56-57.
- "Shakespeare, the Psalter, and the Vulgate in "Henry V" Shakespeare Quarterly Vol. 43, No. 1 (Spring, 1992), pp. 71–72.
- "A Young Scholar from Rheims" English Language Notes (Mar 1993) 30 (3): 7.
- "Shakespeare's Knowledge of Italian" Shakespeare Survey (1994) 47: 161. "Studies the Italian narrative sources of William Shakespeare's plays. Shakespeare's acquaintance with John Florio's language manuals; Adherence of Shakespeare's plays to his Italian sources; Evidence in `The Merchant of Venice.'"
- "Shakespeare and the Tomson New Testament" Notes and Queries (1995) 42 (3): 290-291.
- "Biblical Echoes in Troilus and Cressida" Notes and Queries (1996) 43 (2): 160-162.
- "A Note on Troilus and Cressida, II.iii.1–37" Notes and Queries (1997) 44 (4): 503-505.
- "Shakespeare and the Authorized Version" Notes and Queries (1998) 45 (3): 343-345.
- Biblical References in Shakespeare's Plays, Newark: University of Delaware Press, (1999), ISBN 978-0-87413-677-7. "This volume provides a survey of the English Bibles of Shakespeare's day, notes their similarities and differences, and indicates which version the playwright knew best. The biblical references in each of Shakespeare's plays are then analyzed, as are his references to the Prayer Book and the homilies. The question of what constitutes a valid biblical reference is also discussed."
- "Shakespeare and the Bishops' Bible" Notes and Queries (2000) 47 (1): 94-97.
- "The Taverner Bible, Jugge's Edition of Tyndale, and Shakespeare" English Language Notes (Dec 2000) 38 (2): 24.
- "Biblical References in Julius Caesar" Notes and Queries (2002) 49 (2): 226-227.
- "Collecting Pre-King James English Bibles" Private Library (Summer 2003) 6 (2): 52-61.
- "Shakespeare's Sonnet 146" English Language Notes (Jun 2004) 41 (4): 15-19.
- "Henry V and Its Quartos" Shakespeare Newsletter (Fall 2007) 57 (2): 43-48.
- "Ruth 3:15—The ‘He’ and ‘She’ Bibles" 'Notes and Queries' (2009) 56 (4): 621-624.
- Biblical References in Shakespeare's Plays University of Delaware Press, (2011), ISBN 978-1-61149-358-0.

== Book Reviews by Shaheen ==
- "Book Review of Shakespeare's Religious Background by Peter Milward (1973)" Shakespeare Studies (1977) 10: 368.
- "Book Review of Christian Ritual and the World of Shakespeare's Tragedies by Herbert R. Coursen, Jr. (1976)" Shakespeare Studies (1979) 12: 300.
- "Book Review of Shakespeare and the Bible by Steven Marx (2000)" Notes & Queries (Mar 2001) 48 (1): 58.

== Reviews of Shaheen's Books ==
- Keenan, Hugh T. "Book Review of Biblical References in 'The Faerie Queene'" Library Journal (4/1/1977) 102 (7): 812.
- Schell, Richard. "Book Review of Biblical References in 'The Faerie Queene'" Spenser Newsletter (1977) 8 (1): 11-12.
- Lewis, Cynthia. "Book Review of Biblical References in Shakespeare's Tragedies" Shakespeare Quarterly (Spring 1989) 40 (1): 108-111.
- Dollard, Peter. "Book Review of Biblical References in Shakespeare's Comedies" Library Journal (6/15/1993) 118 (11): 70.
- Evans, Robert C. "Book Review of Biblical References in Shakespeare's Comedies" Sixteenth Century Journal (1994) 25 (3): 707.
- Stritmatter, Roger. "Book Review of Biblical References in Shakespeare’s Comedies" Elizabethan Review (Autumn 1995) 3 (2).
- Nichols, Heidi L. "Book Review of Biblical References in Shakespeare's Plays" Sixteenth Century Journal (Spring 2000) 31 (1): 290-292.
- "Book Review of Biblical References in Shakespeare's Plays" Shofar: An Interdisciplinary Journal of Jewish Studies (Winter 2001) 19 (2): 203.
- Curren-Aquino, Deborah T. "Book Review of Biblical References in Shakespeare's Plays" Shakespeare Quarterly Spring 2001, Vol. 52 (1): 148.
- Beauregard, David. "Book Review of Biblical References in Shakespeare's Plays" Religion & the Arts Sep 2001, Vol. 5 (3): 317-330.
