= Sonnet 121 =

« » Sonnet 121
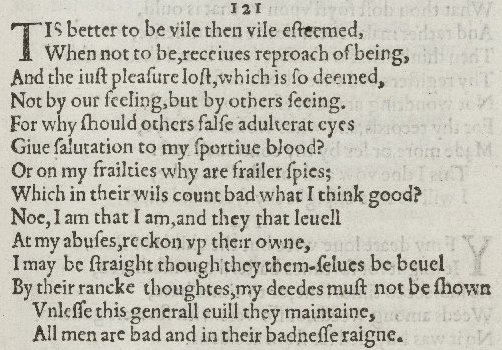
- Sonent 121 in the 1609 Quarto
Q1
Q2
Q3
C
’Tis better to be vile than vile esteemed,
When not to be receives reproach of being,
And the just pleasure lost, which is so deemed
Not by our feeling, but by others’ seeing:
For why should others’ false adulterate eyes
Give salutation to my sportive blood?
Or on my frailties why are frailer spies,
Which in their wills count bad what I think good?
No, I am that I am, and they that level
At my abuses reckon up their own:
I may be straight, though they themselves be bevel;
By their rank thoughts my deeds must not be shown;
Unless this general evil they maintain,
All men are bad and in their badness reign.
—William Shakespeare
4
8
12
14

Sonnet 121 is one of 154 sonnets written by the English playwright and poet William Shakespeare. It is a member of the Fair Youth sequence, in which the poet expresses his love towards his young lover.

== Synopsis ==
The speaker argues that being falsely accused of vice is worse than actually being vicious, since honest pleasure is ruined by others' judgment rather than one's own conscience. The speaker rejects the "spies" who project their own corrupt desires onto him, insisting he alone knows his true character ("I am that I am"). He accuses his critics of judging him by their own corrupt standards. He closes by rejecting the cynical, universal claim that "all men are bad," refusing to let others' faults define or excuse his own conduct.

== Structure ==
Sonnet 121 is an English or Shakespearean sonnet. The English sonnet has three quatrains, followed by a final rhyming couplet. It follows the typical rhyme scheme of the form ABAB CDCD EFEF GG and is composed in iambic pentameter, a type of poetic metre based on five pairs of metrically weak/strong syllabic positions. The 1st line exemplifies a regular iambic pentameter:

  ×   /  ×   /  ×  /     ×   /   ×  / 
'Tis better to be vile than vile esteem'd, (121.1)

Four lines (2, 4, 9, and 11) have a final extrametrical syllable or feminine ending, as for example:

 /   × ×    /  ×     /   × /  ×     /(×) 
Not by our feeling, but by others' seeing: (121.4)

/ = ictus, a metrically strong syllabic position. × = nonictus. (×) = extrametrical syllable.

Line 4 (above) also exhibits another common metrical variation, an initial reversal. Initial reversals are potentially present in lines 7, 8, and 11. The 3rd line features one (potentially two; the second can be otherwise scanned) rightward movements of an ictus (resulting in a four-position figure, × × / /, sometimes referred to as a minor ionic):

×     ×  /     /  ×    /      ×   ×   /  / 
And the just pleasure lost, which is so deem'd (121.3)

A similar minor ionic is potentially present in line 12's "By their rank thoughts", though not if "their" receives contrastive accent.

The meter demands that line 13's "general" function as two syllables.
