= St Benet Sherehog =

Former church in London

Coordinates: 51°30′47.5″N 0°5′29″W

- St Benet Sherehog
- OS grid reference: TQ 32536 81089
- Location: London
- Country: England
- Denomination: Anglican

Architecture
- Years built: in Saxon times
- Demolished: 1666

St Benet Sherehog, additionally dedicated to St Osyth, was a medieval parish church built before the year 1111, on a site now occupied by No 1 Poultry in Cordwainer Ward, in what was then the wool-dealing district of the City of London. A shere hog is a castrated ram after its first shearing.

== History ==
The church was originally dedicated to St Osyth. Sise Lane in the parish uses an abbreviated form of the saint's name. The historian John Stow believed that the later dedication of "Benet Sherehog" was derived from a corruption of the name of Bennet Shorne, a benefactor of the church in the reign of Edward II.

Archaeological excavations in 1994-5 discovered well-preserved remains of the first phase of the building, probably dating from around 1080. The church seems to have originally consisted of a single space measuring 10m x 5m internally with doors on the north and south sides. It was built from reused Roman ragstone and tile, with limestone quoins. There was a mortar floor, successive additional layers of which had raised the level by more than a metre by the early 13th century. Ragstone foundations and chalk footings around the original church indicated later phases of enlargement.

The patronage of the church belonged to the monastery of St Mary Overy until the Dissolution, when it passed to the Crown.

Matthew Griffith chaplain to Charles I was rector from 1640 until 1642, when he was removed from the post and imprisoned after preaching a sermon entitled "A Pathetical Persuasion to Pray for Publick Peace" in St Paul's Cathedral.

== Destruction ==
St Benet's was one of the 86 parish churches destroyed in the Great Fire of London, and it was not selected to be rebuilt when the Rebuilding of London Act 1670 (22 Cha. 2. c. 11) became law. The parish was united to that of St Stephen Walbrook in the same year, but continued to be represented by its own churchwarden. In 1685, a church report judged the unification a success. Nearly two hundred years later, however, this arrangement was still capable of causing tension. Some of its parish records survive, and have been collated.

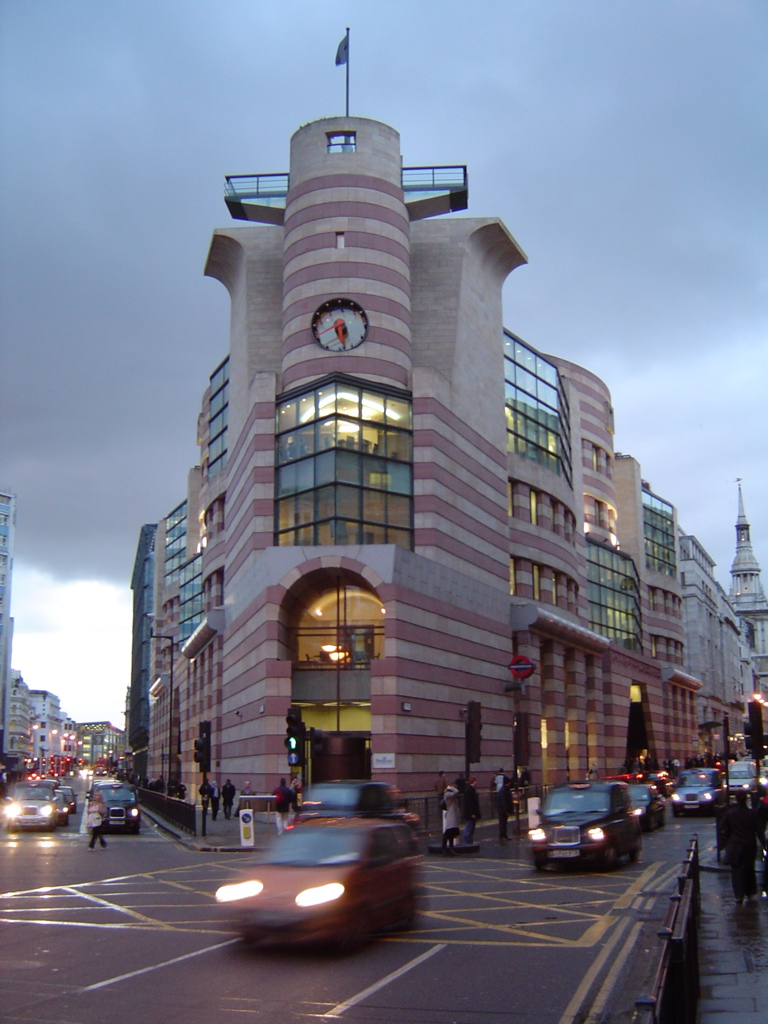
The site is now occupied by No 1 Poultry

The site of the church was used as a burial-ground for the united parishes until closed in 1853 under the Burial Act 1852. It was excavated between 1994 and 1996, before the current office block was erected.

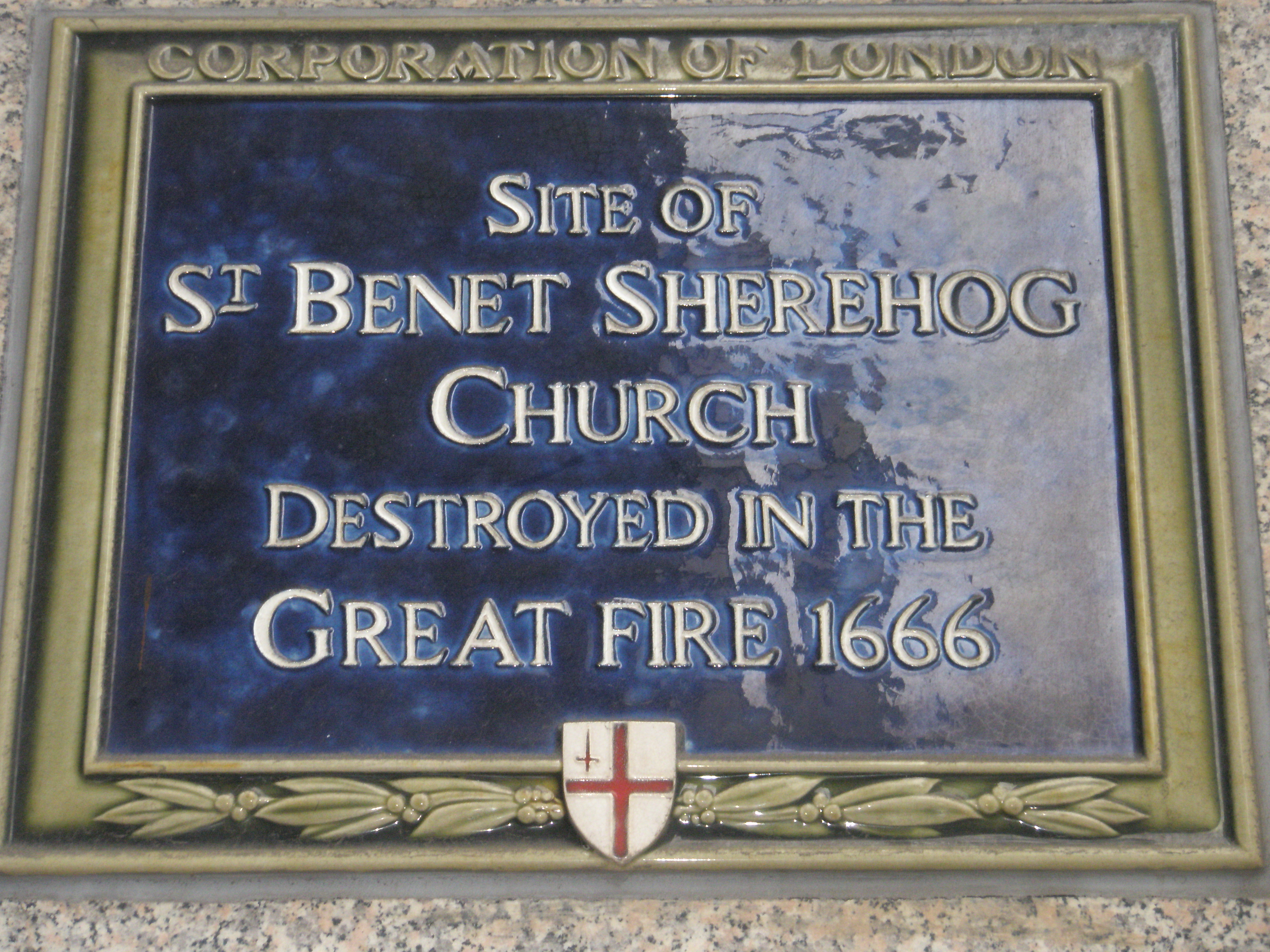
Plaque marking the site of the church in Sise Lane

== Burials ==
- John Fresshe (d. 1397) alderman of Cordwainer Ward and Lord Mayor of London from 1394 to 1396.
- Edward Hall (1497–1547), was an English lawyer, Member of Parliament, and historian.
- Katherine (Fowler) Philips (1632–1664), was an English poet.
- Hector Philips (1655–1655), was the infant son of Katherine Philips, about whose death two of her more famous poems were written.
- Joan Lake (d.8 October 1573), from her first marriage Lady Warren, wife of Sir Ralph Warren, Lord Mayor of London; from her second marriage Lady White, wife of Sir Thomas White, founder of St John's College, Oxford.

== Bibliography ==
- Bannerman, W.B, RAOC Harleian Society 1919–20 The Registers of St, Stephen, Walbrook, and St. Benet Sherehog, London. Part I (Baptisms 1557 to 1790; Marriages 1557 to 1754; Burials 1557 to 1716) & Part II (Baptisms 1790 to 1860; Marriages 1754 to 1860; Burials 1716 to 1860) London, Harleian Society, 1920
- Betjeman, John, Sovereign City of London Churches, Andover: Pitkin, 1967 rpnt 1992 ISBN 0-85372-565-9
- Cobb, G London City Churches: London, B T Batsford Ltd., 1977
- 'Church of England, Parish of St. Stephen Walbrook: Visitation order issued by the Archdeacon of London to the united parishes, 1685'. - M0015630CL cited in City of London Parish Registers Guide 4 Hallows, A.(Ed) - London, Guildhall Library Research, 1974 ISBN 0-900422-30-0.
- A Dictionary of London Harben, H: London, Herbert Jenkins, 1918
- Huelin, G, Vanished Churches of the City of London, London, Guildhall Library Publications, 1996ISBN 0900422424
- The London Encyclopaedia Hibbert, C; Weinreb, D; Keay, J: London, Pan Macmillan, 1983 (rev 1993, 2008) ISBN 978-1-4050-4924-5
- Miles, A., Tankard, D. White, W. Burial at the site of the parish church of St Benet Sherehog before and after the Great Fire: excavations at 1 Poultry, City of London London, Museum of London Archaeological Service, Monograph Series, 2007
- Reynolds, H, The Churches of the City of London, London, The Bodley Head, 1922
- 'Letter from Michael Gibbs, 33 Walbrook concerning the separateness of two church wardens’ duties'. The Times, Thursday, Sep 21, 1843; pg. 5; Issue 18407; col E
