= Sonnet 122 =

« » Sonnet 122
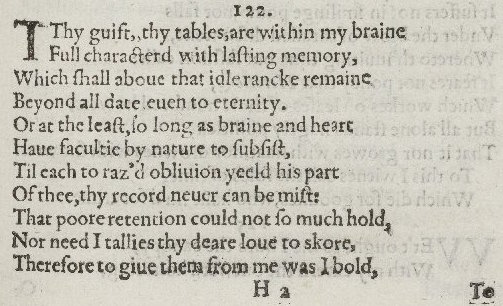
- The first eleven lines of Sonnet 122 in the 1609 Quarto
Q1
Q2
Q3
C
Thy gift, thy tables, are within my brain
Full character’d with lasting memory,
Which shall above that idle rank remain,
Beyond all date, even to eternity:
Or, at the least, so long as brain and heart
Have faculty by nature to subsist;
Till each to raz’d oblivion yield his part
Of thee, thy record never can be miss’d.
That poor retention could not so much hold,
Nor need I tallies thy dear love to score;
Therefore to give them from me was I bold,
To trust those tables that receive thee more:
To keep an adjunct to remember thee
Were to import forgetfulness in me.
—William Shakespeare
4
8
12
14

Sonnet 122 is one of 154 sonnets written by the English playwright and poet William Shakespeare, and first published in 1609. It is a member of the Fair Youth sequence, in which the poet expresses his love towards a young man. Although the relationship started exuberantly in Sonnet 18 ("Shall I compare thee to a summer's day") by now it has given way to an almost defensive tone. The poet justifies giving away or losing a notebook ("tables") given him by the youth to record shared events by saying that his memories of them are stronger.

== Structure ==
Sonnet 122 is an English or Shakespearean sonnet. The English sonnet has three quatrains, followed by a final rhyming couplet. It follows the typical rhyme scheme of the form ABAB CDCD EFEF GG and is composed in iambic pentameter, a type of poetic metre based on five pairs of metrically weak/strong syllabic positions. The 1st line exemplifies a regular iambic pentameter:

  ×  /      ×  / ×    /    ×  /   ×   / 
Thy gift, thy tables, are within my brain (122.1)

/ = ictus, a metrically strong syllabic position. × = nonictus.

Line 4 exhibits a mid-line reversal:

 × /   ×    /    /     × × /  × / 
Beyond all date; even to eternity: (122.4)

Lines 3, 5, 11, and 14 all have potential initial reversals. Line 10 potentially incorporates a rightward movement of the third ictus (resulting in a four-position figure, × × / /, sometimes referred to as a minor ionic):

 ×   /   ×  /  ×     ×  /    /    ×   / 
Nor need I tallies thy dear love to score; (122.10)

However, if "thy" receives emphasis, the line becomes regular again.

The meter demands that line 4's "even" function as one syllable, and line 7's "oblivion" as three.
