= Sonnet 125 =

« » Sonnet 125
- The first two lines of Sonnet 125 in the 1609 Quarto
Q1
Q2
Q3
C
Were’t aught to me I bore the canopy,
With my extern the outward honouring,
Or laid great bases for eternity,
Which prove more short than waste or ruining?
Have I not seen dwellers on form and favour
Lose all, and more, by paying too much rent,
For compound sweet forgoing simple savour,
Pitiful thrivers, in their gazing spent?
No, let me be obsequious in thy heart,
And take thou my oblation, poor but free,
Which is not mix’d with seconds, knows no art
But mutual render, only me for thee.
Hence, thou suborn’d informer! a true soul
When most impeach’d stands least in thy control.
—William Shakespeare
4
8
12
14

Sonnet 125 is one of 154 sonnets written by the English playwright and poet William Shakespeare. It is a member of the Fair Youth sequence, in which the poet expresses his love towards a young man.

== Structure ==
Sonnet 125 is an English or Shakespearean sonnet. The English sonnet has three quatrains, followed by a final rhyming couplet. It follows the typical rhyme scheme of the form abab cdcd efef gg, although (as discussed below) in this case the f rhymes repeat the sound of the a rhymes. It is composed in iambic pentameter, a type of poetic metre based on five pairs of metrically weak/strong syllabic positions. The 6th line exemplifies a regular iambic pentameter:

 ×   /    ×    /     ×  / ×    /   ×    / 
Lose all, and more, by paying too much rent,

 ×   /  ×      /    ×  /×    /  ×   /(×) 
For compound sweet forgoing simple savour, (125.6-7)

/ = ictus, a metrically strong syllabic position. × = nonictus. (×) = extrametrical syllable.

Lines 7 (scanned above) and 5 each have a final extrametrical syllable or feminine ending. Line 13 contains both an initial reversal and a rightward movement of the fourth ictus (resulting in a four-position figure, × × / /, sometimes referred to as a minor ionic):

 /       ×   × /     ×  /  ×   ×   /   / 
Hence, thou suborn'd informer! a true soul (125.13)

An initial reversal is also found in line 8, while a mid-line reversal occurs in line 4. Due to the flexibility of emphasis in monosyllables, the beginning of line 11 may be scanned as regular, an initial reversal, or a minor ionic.

The meter demands that line 9's "obsequious" function as three syllables, and line 12's "mutual" as two.

=== Analysis of the repeated rhyme ===
As seen in Sonnet 125, the meter of the poem or the rhyme scheme is occasionally altered from the typical ABAB CDCD EFEF GG structure. Sonnet 125 uses a varying rhyme scheme of ABAB CDCD EAEA FF, with "free" (line 10) and "thee" (line 12) corresponding to the rhyme of "canopy" in line 1 and "eternity" in line 3. There are many views as to why Shakespeare chose to vary the rhyme scheme in Sonnet 125.

Philip McGuire believes this type of free verse is meaningful. McGuire argues that Shakespeare, with his variation in verse, is claiming to not be a "dweller on form" (line 5) and "free" (line 10) from the repetitive form of the traditional "English sonnet", adding to the symbolism contained in the lines. McGuire also states that the speaker of the sonnet exclaims that his "oblation" (line 10 ) to his beloved is "poor but free" (line 10) and "knows no art/, But mutual render, only me for thee" (lines 11-12) which directly pertains to the rhyme scheme, as rhyme in itself is "mutual render" (line 12), dependent on two separate words to exist. The speaker states that his art is "poor but free", "poor" in a sense that it is missing one of the perfect seven rhymes found in typical sonnet structure, but has only six, an imperfect structure missing an important piece, alluding to the mindset of the speaker in his loss of the Fair Youth's affections, directly corresponding to the "mutual render" embodied in the rhyme scheme and the "mutual render" he feels towards his beloved. In effect, the atypical character of the "mutual render" binding the a rhymes of sonnet 125 is a literal testimony of the selfless generosity that the speaker ascribes to the "mutual render” he and his beloved share - "only me for thee".

Helen Hennessy Vendler agrees that Shakespeare's variation in verse is a deliberate emphasis on the symbolism and meaning to the speaker's words. Vendler comments on the intention of the rhyme scheme, claiming that Shakespeare as a poet is conscious of grammatical and syntactic possibility as "ingredients of invention" and he "routinely, but not idly, varies tense, mood, subject-position, and clause-patterns in order to make conceptual or rhetorical points". Vendler acknowledges Shakespeare's art within words and claims that any variation to the rhyme scheme is intended to add purpose to the poem itself.

Paul Edmondson and Stanley Wells also argue that varying rhyme scheme is intentional but is not necessarily premeditated to attach further symbolism to the speaker's words. Rather, states Edmondson and Wells, the altered rhyme scheme, if not only for the literal symbolism contained in the lines, is meant to keep the mind of the reader engaged. To go further, Edmondson and Wells believe that the variation of the rhyme mirrors the fluctuation of the poet's emotions and thoughts as he writes, or the emotional uncertainty of the speaker, conveyed to the reader through the abnormal rhyme pattern.

== Analysis ==
This sonnet's message appears to be two-fold. First, the author is contemplating the fragility of life and the short life span of mankind's ventures. Second, the author directly addresses a significant other, offering himself in exchange for the addressee, with no ulterior motives. In fact, sonnet "125 expresses unequivocally its preference for the simple". Most likely, the addressee of this sonnet is the "Fair Youth" that is commonly featured throughout Shakespeare's sonnets because it falls within the sequence of 1-126. Much like other sonnets from what scholars call the "Fair Youth" sequence, this one is apparently instructing the young man to consider his mortality and make the most of his life. In the final two lines, or couplet, the author suddenly addresses an unknown "suborned informer" and tells him or her that he is outside of their control.

=== Quatrain 1 ===
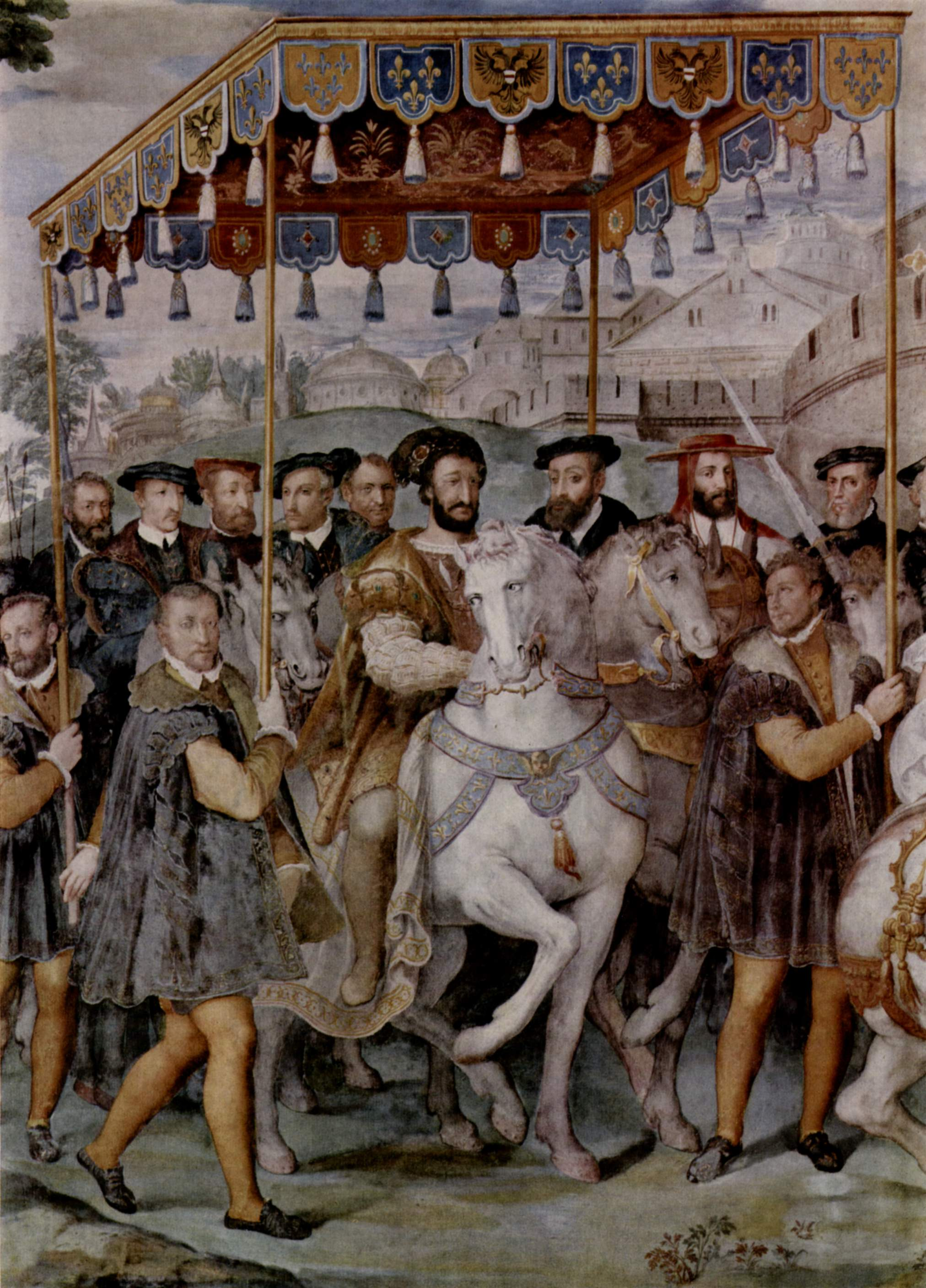
A canopy borne by courtiers over king Francis I of France

The first quatrain introduces the reader to the author's general argument of mankind's endeavors. In the author's opinion, earthly ventures such as carrying the "canopy", which would have been held above the head of a celebrity during a ceremony, or "great bases" to mean massive foundations, are meaningless because time and "ruining" destroy them. Booth also notes the author's play on words in lines 3-4. By placing eternity at the end of line 3 and saying, "proves more short", Shakespeare is highlighting the lack of timelessness in such endeavors. As aforementioned, this is a common theme of Shakespeare's sonnets and this quatrain of Sonnet 125 reiterates the motif of mortality.

=== Quatrain 2 ===
The second quatrain continues this theme on mankind's pointless attempts. However, as the first quatrain started with broad and majestic endeavors, this quatrain begins to relate more to the common desires of mankind. In line 5, the quatrain starts by mentioning people's obsessions with their "form and favor", which should be understood as "outward appearance" and "the good will of superiors". Next, in line 6, the quatrain addresses how people give up simpler pleasures in order to spend all of their resources "and more" on their foolish obsessions. This line hints that people often go into debt over their "pitiful" attempts at luxurious living.

=== Quatrain 3 ===
The final quatrain offers the poem's volta, or "turn in thought" ("volta" def. 1). This third section changes the focus from general reflection to a direct address of the "Fair Youth". The author begins with a declaration that he will be "obsequious" and dutiful to the "Youth". The speaker then asks the "Fair Youth" to accept his "oblation" or offer, which is free of both monetary obligations and underhanded motivations. Line 11 highlights that the promise is "without seconds", or consisting of pure intentions. Booth also states that because the initial "h" was often dropped in Elizabethan English, this word may in fact mean heart and have a double entendre. Finally, Shakespeare reminds the "Youth" that his love is given freely in exchange for his.

=== Couplet ===
Like all sonnets, the final two lines form a couplet. These final two rhyming lines abruptly change the focus of the poem once again by addressing a new party called a "suborned informer". While it is not clear who this "informer" is, many critics disagree on why the author chooses to end this sonnet by directly addressing them. For example, Vendler believes that the "informer is a third party that views "the speaker's motives in cultivating the young man are mercenary". However, according to another critic, Heather Ousby, the unknown character of the "subdued informer" is actually the "Fair Youth" himself. She argues that Shakespeare is purposefully taking a stern and direct approach because Shakespeare is approaching the end of the sequence. Regardless of the "informer's" identity, this couplet offers a final and interesting turn to this sonnet.

=== Symbolism, character identity, and tone ===
Sonnet 125 carries a great deal of symbolic language, but the purpose and structure of a sonnet do not allow nor require detailed explanation of the meaning of this language. Due to the ambiguous nature of Shakespeare's words, this sonnet can be understood in a variety of ways. A number of scholars have examined Sonnet 125 and come away with different conclusions about its message. The number of characters identified by scholars ranges between two and four depending on how the language throughout this particular sonnet and the entire sonnet cycle is interpreted. As the number of characters fluctuates, the meanings assigned to each action within the sonnet take on new meaning.

According to Thomas M. Greene, Sonnet 125 contrasts the true values of grand external gestures in opposition to simple acts of inward devotion as a means of attaining the affections of the Friend. The First Quatrain sets out the argument that the Speaker could perform grand external gestures such as the bearing of a ceremonial canopy or the building of some great monument, but that these actions cannot outlast ruination. The idea being that these actions are fleeting and are therefore of little value to either the Speaker or the Friend.

Greene recognizes the "great bases" of line 3 to be a manor house which carry over into his understanding of the Second Quatrain. According to Greene, this "manor house is faintly sustained by "ruining", "dwellers", "rent", and the possible allusion to compound and simple interest". This economic terminology transforms the actions of the suitors into a sort of currency that is spent too quickly. In line 7, the compound sweet is seen by Greene as an artificial confection or overwrought style of poetry in great use by the other suitors who are themselves poets. It is a reference to Sonnet 76 in "which the poet reproached himself for omitting it from his own verse". The symbolism behind dwellers and rent is meant to show that a large number of people are offering grand gestures of affection with nothing to show for it in the end. There is no returned investment when you rent a property, because the owner receives and retains all of the expense you put into it. Greene puts a great deal of meaning to the closing line of the Second Quatrain. According to Greene, the word "spent" means bankrupted, exhausted, and failed while also referring to being "drained of semen". He sums this up by adding, "Unsuccessful entrepreneurs, with only the groundworks built of their mansion of love, the failure of their misguided, formalist generosity is symbolized by the suitors' symbolic distance from their prize, observable but not touchable". The suitors are "pittifull thrivors" who have expended so much to win affection only to find themselves wanting.

In the Third Quatrain, Greene recognizes the shift from the overt actions of the other suitors toward the inverted and humble actions of the Speaker. The Speaker wishes to be seen as dutiful and devout by the Friend. To do so, the Third Quatrain employs language that evokes thoughts of a religious servant who makes sacrifice. According to Greene, "In this secularized sacrament, the dutiful poet freely makes an offering intended to manifest the inwardness and simplicity of his own devotion, knowing, or thinking that he knows, that his oblation will win him the unmediated, inner reciprocity which is his goal". Greene adds that the "unformulated implication of the work as a whole seems to be that expense is never truly recuperated". Though the Speaker is seeking a relationship of reciprocity through means not employed by the other suitors, he still uses the art of poetry to make his case for the affection of the Friend. Greene sees this as the wedge between the Speaker and the object of his affection. He says, "Language is condemned to be compound; poetry is art; it shapes and forms and distorts; it introduces inequalities, like the inequality between an offering and an exchange, or the inequality between a secular offering and the sacramental body of Christ". Thus, the Speaker has created a distance between himself and the Friend by creating these sonnets.

In the Couplet, Greene determines that the "informer" is not someone who slanders the Speaker, but that the voice within himself is the enemy. By giving his actions form through poetry, the Speaker has joined up with the other failed suitors in paying rent for which he gets no return.

Ronald Levao agrees with Thomas M. Greene's understanding that the Speaker replaces "superficial pomp, external loyalty, and possibly the "art" of poetry itself" with "pure simplicity and single-minded, quasi-religious devotion" in order to receive "mutual render". He does disagree with Greene's summation of the informer from line 13. Levao sees the informer as some unnamed person who has broken the mood of Sonnet 125 by bringing forth accusations against the Speaker. This changes the meaning of the sonnet for Levao. He sees it as "not a defiance of Time or court gossip nor even a reproach to the young man for spurning the proffered mutuality, but the poet's final attempt to revive his commitment".

Heather Ousby points out that the identity of the "subbornd Informer" has proved especially contentious for critics. She points to several interpretations of the informer which include the Friend, some sort of spy, and "an abstract force such as jealousy". In her interpretation of the Sonnet, Ousby settles on the idea that the informer represents the Friend. She bases this thought on the various meanings of the word "suborn" during this time period. Rather than spying, informing could also be seen as inspiring and thus it would refer to the inspiration for the sonnet. Likewise, the term suborn meant corruption in loyalty which the Speaker accuses the Friend of in other sonnets. Ousby is making a case for eliminating the informer as some third party, much like Greene. The difference is that Ousby uses the subtraction of this would-be character to shift the tone of the sonnet. She agrees that the first two quatrains concern how the "dwellers on form and favor are destroyed by that humiliating process" of giving unreciprocated affection. She sees the third quatrain as a plea to the Friend or as a directive to both of them. The couplet, however, becomes a means of stating the Speaker's independence from the Friend due to his "poor but free" oblations which mean a lot but cost so little. For Ousby, the Speaker seems to be separating himself from a disloyal patron who demeans his work.

C.R.B. Combellack openly challenges Ousby's interpretation of the Informer's identity. He feels that since, "Shakespeare's objections to false accusations against him are the very subject matter of the poem, an Informer who lays information against another is particularly apropos in the poem". Combellack subscribes to the idea that there are four characters represented in Sonnet 125: the Speaker, the Friend, the Informer, and the Suborner. He believes that the actions of the first quatrain were accusations leveled against Shakespeare as the Speaker. For Combellack, Shakespeare becomes the canopy-bearer as a means of advancement toward fame and fortune. In the second quatrain, Shakespeare shows how those who participate in these grand gestures often pay too much and lose a great deal only to have their gestures be seen as empty. Combellack sees the third quatrain as the offer of genuine love to the Friend, "uncomplicated by any secondary thought of self-interest, in return for love". The couplet then changes tone once more as Combellack views it. He sees it as Shakespeare defending himself against gossip by pointing out how "outrageously untrue gossip" could not possibly be believed by his Friend. There is more hope in Combellack's interpretation of Sonnet 125, because he sees the altruism of the love offered by Shakespeare and how vehemently he denies the rumors against him.
