= Sonnet 126 =

« » Sonnet 126
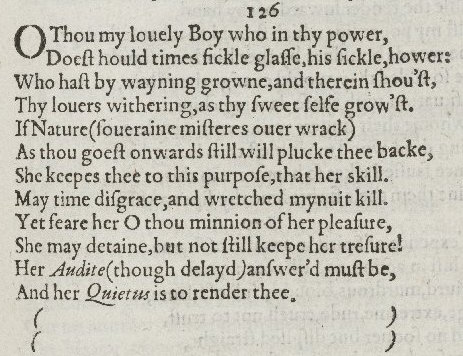
- Sonnet 126 in the 1609 Quarto
O thou, my lovely boy, who in thy power
Dost hold Time’s fickle glass, his sickle, hour;
Who hast by waning grown, and therein show’st
Thy lovers withering as thy sweet self grow’st;
If Nature, sovereign mistress over wrack,
As thou goest onwards, still will pluck thee back,
She keeps thee to this purpose, that her skill
May time disgrace and wretched minutes kill.
Yet fear her, O thou minion of her pleasure!
She may detain, but not still keep, her treasure:
Her audit, though delay’d, answer’d must be
And her quietus is to render thee.
( )
( )
—William Shakespeare
2
4
6
8
10
12

Sonnet 126 is one of 154 sonnets by William Shakespeare. It is the final member of the Fair Youth sequence, in which the poet shows how Time and Nature coincide.

== Synopsis ==
The sonnet was rendered in prose paraphrase by A. L. Rowse as:

O you, my lovely boy, who hold in your power Time's hour-glass and his sickle—you who wane as you grow older and in that show your friends withering as you yourself grow up: if Nature, sovereign mistress over chaos, as you go onwards will ever pluck you back, she keeps you to demonstrate her power to hold up time. Yet fear her, you who are Nature's darling: she may detain her treasure, but not keep it forever. Her last account, though delayed, must be paid and her discharge is to render you up.

== Structure ==
Although known as "Sonnet 126", this poem is not formally a sonnet in the strict sense, and is one of only two poems in the series (the other being Sonnet 99) which do not conform to Shakespeare's typical rhyme scheme. Instead of 14 lines rhyming abab cdcd efef gg, the poem is composed of six couplets (aa bb cc dd ee ff). Like the other sonnets (except Sonnet 145) it is composed in iambic pentameter, a type of poetic metre based on five pairs of metrically weak/strong syllabic positions. The 5th line exemplifies a regular iambic pentameter:

×   / ×     /   ×     /   ×   / ×    / 
If Nature, sovereign mistress over wrack, (126.5)

The 9th and 10th lines each have a final extrametrical syllable or feminine ending:

 ×   /    ×   /   ×   /  ×  /   ×    / (×) 
Yet fear her, O thou minion of her pleasure! (126.9)

/ = ictus, a metrically strong syllabic position. × = nonictus. (×) = extrametrical syllable.

It is possible that the first couplet also has feminine endings, though Booth reads "pow'r" and "hour" as monosyllabic. Line 11 has a mid-line reversal ("answer'd"):

 ×  /  ×     /     × /     /   ×     ×    / 
Her audit, though delay'd, answer'd must be (126.11)

The meter demands that line 4's "withering" function as two syllables, and line 6's "goest" as one.

== Envoi ==
Sonnet 126 has been dubbed the envoi to the "Fair Youth" sonnets. An envoy or envoi, as defined by the Oxford English Dictionary is "The action of sending forth a poem; hence, the concluding part of a poetical or prose composition; the author's parting words; a dedication, postscript. Now chiefly the short stanza which concludes a poem written in certain archaic metrical forms."

Sethna has argued that Sonnet 126 was handed to William Herbert (the "Fair Youth" in his view) just before his 27th birthday, completing the period of their 9-year friendship with words that were clear, allusive, highly emotional and deeply pensive. Paul Ramsey, author of The Fickle Glass: A Study of Shakespeare's Sonnets, also writes that, "sonnet 126 seems a very natural envoy".

The same idea of closing is paralleled by the authors of The Norton Anthology. This "sonnet" or envoi, of six couplets, concludes the part of the sequence apparently addressed to the youth and formally signals a change in tone and subject matter in the remaining sonnets.

== Analysis ==
Ramsey, when examining the overview of plot of the sonnet, observes that Shakespeare begins Sonnet 126 with a claim, then moves to a fear, and then ends with a stark, precise accepting of the power and unavoidability of time and death. When analyzing these 12 lines, Sethna suggests that the lovely boy is becoming substantially older in years without losing any beauty. In fact, he is increasing with beauty: he has grown by waning, he has turned more boyishly lovely as the span of his life lessens further and further. Sethna believes that the boy's lack of aging underscores Shakespeare's aging, and Shakespeare's aging highlights nature's ability to ignore Time in the boy's case. This is emphasized by Nature's capacity to foil Time's destructiveness. Nonetheless, the capacity can only last so long.

Slightly paralleled by A. L. Rowse, author of Shakespeare's Sonnets: The Problems Solved, lines 3-4 are interpreted as alluding to the youth's beauty as a contrast with his friends. As the youth's beauty wanes, so his friends wither, as he grows older, contrasting Sethna's view of the youth's beauty accentuating Shakespeare's lack of beauty. Rowse also suggests that this idea may also imply a further consistency; Shakespeare's concern is with the ebb and flow of things, their waxing and waning, perhaps displaying the influence of constant Ovidian thought.

Anspacher, too, interprets the idea of time with a similar view stating that Love is not Time's fool. In other words, even Time, "the most willful and absolute dictator in the world, cannot treat Love as he would treat his fool or his jester", and eventually Time must succeed to Nature. As Murray Krieger – author of A Window to Criticism: Shakespeare's Sonnets and Modern Poetics – notes, Time's sickle represents an “ignoble reduction of time. A reduction that cannot be produced, no matter the tool nor the wistfulness.

When analyzing the final couplet, author and critic R. Graves reasons that this couplet is not only the pictographic "Quietus" of line 12 but also the "delayed Oddity" mentioned in line 11: "Audite (though delayd) answer'd must be." (Here even the parentheses seem like a predictive pun).

One meaning of this line is, "My reader must try to explain my terminal 'Oddity'. Another pun occurs in the verb "to render," which has three relevant meanings. The first, "to repeat", seems connected with the punning phrase "two rendered he" and with the couplet's "repetition." But the other two meanings are "to melt (fat, etc.)", and to "reproduce or represent, esp. by artistic means; to depict". These meanings join the tangled double entendres in "Enter [Endure, End here, And hear] Quietuses two [to] render thee" to suggest such readings of line 12 as "You're suffering a melt-down over this couplet" and "Nature's two 'Quietuses' intrude here to depict you". Because an "Audit" was originally a "hearing," one ironic idea here is that something silent (like the missing couplet) can be "heard" and "must be answered--or can be "Anne's word." The pun "End here" (line 12) signals the poet's early ending in line 12, not 14. A different kind of runic wit occurs in the punning conceit "Enter Quietuses to [two]" where two abstractions—the empty couplet lines—hover like hooded figures in a medieval morality.

Though scholars may differ in their interpretation of text, the central idea seems to be very clear. Sonnet 126 deals with a marked lapse of time and leads the reader to the realization that the relationship between author and subject has continued on for years but has now begun to wane or fizzle out. Ramsey, too, believes that the central idea rests in the reality of the natural relation that must be paid and the truth that must be faced by the author. Through these words, it is divulged that love changes, beauty passes, and men die.

== Missing text ==
While previous sonnets of this sequence act to console against attempt to circumvent time's inevitable destructive victory, scholars have argued that 126 concedes the point. Rather than suggest that the boy can indeed find a way around time, "here the speaker makes no such proposals; this twelve-line poem lacks the final two lines where, in the sonnet, the speaker often constructs his consolations. By the end of this subsequence, mutability has proved to be the speaker's ally rather than a foe to be defeated. Instead of seeking consolations for the destruction of beauty, the final three couplets simply warn the young man of nature's inevitable defeat at the hands of time". The speaker here seems to accept, rather than fight against, the inevitability of time's changes.

While inherent, unpreventable change at the hands of time stand as a negative throughout the previous poems, it here takes on a beneficial role. Although the boy's beauty may be destroyed by time, time has also waned the speaker's love, making this destruction more bearable. As Stockard argues, "Shakespeare…constructs the sequence so as to demonstrate the consolation provided by the waning of the speaker's love, and in the final sonnet of the first subsequence the speaker accepts the consolation that changing reality provides". In accepting the reality of his unrequited, and ultimately shifting, love, the speaker is able to find peace, to some extent, in his relationship with the boy.
