= Sonnet 120 =

« » Sonnet 120
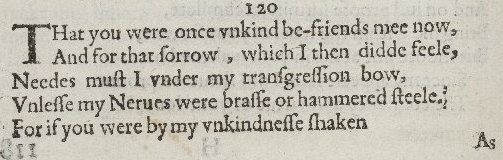
- The first five lines of Sonnet 120 in the 1609 Quarto
Q1
Q2
Q3
C
That you were once unkind befriends me now,
And for that sorrow which I then did feel
Needs must I under my transgression bow,
Unless my nerves were brass or hammer’d steel.
For if you were by my unkindness shaken,
As I by yours, you’ve pass’d a hell of time;
And I, a tyrant, have no leisure taken
To weigh how once I suffer’d in your crime.
O, that our night of woe might have remember’d
My deepest sense, how hard true sorrow hits,
And soon to you, as you to me then, tender’d
The humble salve which wounded bosoms fits!
But that your trespass now becomes a fee;
Mine ransoms yours, and yours must ransom me.
—William Shakespeare
4
8
12
14

Sonnet 120 is one of 154 sonnets written by the English playwright and poet William Shakespeare. It's a member of the Fair Youth sequence, in which the poet expresses his love towards a young man.

== Structure ==
Sonnet 120 is an English or Shakespearean sonnet. The English sonnet has three quatrains, followed by a final rhyming couplet. It follows the typical rhyme scheme of the form ABAB CDCD EFEF GG and is composed in iambic pentameter, a type of poetic metre based on five pairs of metrically weak/strong syllabic positions. The 4th line exemplifies a regular iambic pentameter:

×  /    ×  /      ×     /   ×   /  ×      / 
Unless my nerves were brass or hammer'd steel. (120.4)

Four lines (5, 7, 9, and 11) have a final extrametrical syllable or feminine ending, as for example:

 ×  /   ×   /    ×  / ×  /   ×     /(×) 
For if you were by my unkindness shaken, (120.5)

/ = ictus, a metrically strong syllabic position. × = nonictus. (×) = extrametrical syllable.

== Interpretations ==
- Paul Rhys, for the 2002 compilation album, When Love Speaks (EMI Classics)
