= Lynne Kositsky =

Canadian author

Lynne Kositsky (born 1947) is a Canadian author of poetry and young adult historical fiction. Kositsky, who was born in Montreal, Quebec and grew up in London, England, now lives in the Niagara region of Ontario. As of 2010 she has published ten novels, set in such varied historical contexts as Ireland during the Great Famine of the 1840s, Nova Scotia during the early 19th century, Elizabethan London, and the Holocaust.

Her books often have in common the theme of a youthful protagonist (usually, but not always, female) surviving social disruption or ostracism in a world dominated by the mistakes of adults. Her four books in the Our Canadian Girl series issued by Penguin all focus on an African Canadian ex-slave, Rachel, who is forced to relocate with her parents to Nova Scotia after the Revolutionary War. Like many of Kositsky's other books, the Rachel series received critical acclaim. The first and fourth books of the Rachel series, in the series were both nominated for the prestigious Hackmatack Award, and A Mighty Big Imagining won a White Raven Award, given by the International Youth Library in Munich to books which "contribute to an international understanding of a culture and people."

The Thought of High Windows garnered extensive critical acclaim and won the Canadian Jewish Book Award for Youth in 2006. Reviewers for Kirkus, The Washington Post, Hornbook Magazine, The Center for Children's Books, and the School Library Journal all voiced critical praise for it.

Kositsky's A Question of Will (2000) deals with the Shakespearean authorship question, exploring the Oxfordian perspective, and she has since co-authored with Roger Stritmatter a series of articles for academic journals on the date, sources, and symbolism of Shakespeare's Tempest. A Question of Will was included in the Folger Shakespeare Library's "Golden Lads and Lasses" exhibit (2006).

== Books ==
- Candles (Roussan 1998)
- Rebecca's Flame (Roussan 1999)
- A Question of Will (Roussan 2000)
- A Mighty Big Imagining (Penguin 2001)
- The Maybe House (Penguin 2002)
- Certificate of Freedom (Penguin 2003)
- An Elephant Tree Christmas (Penguin 2004)
- The Thought of High Windows (Kids Can 2004)
- Claire By Moonlight (Tundra 2005)
- Minerva's Voyage (Dundurn 2009)
- Our Canadian Girl (Puffin Canada 2010)
- With Roger Stritmatter, On the Date, Sources and Design of Shakespeare's The Tempest, McFarland & Company, 2013.
- The Plagues of Kondar (Dundurn 2014)
- With Fearful Bravery (Dancing Cat Books 2014)

== Selected works ==
- With Roger Stritmatter, "Shakespeare and the Voyagers Revisited" Review of English Studies 58:236 (September 2007): 447–472.
- With Roger Stritmatter, "O Brave New Worlde: The Tempest and Peter Martyr's De Orbe Novo" Critical Survey 21: 2 (Summer 2009): 7-42.
- With Roger Stritmatter, "A Movable Feast: The Tempest as Shrovetide Revelry" The Shakespeare Yearbook (Volume XVII): 365-404.
