= Sonnet 124 =

« » Sonnet 124
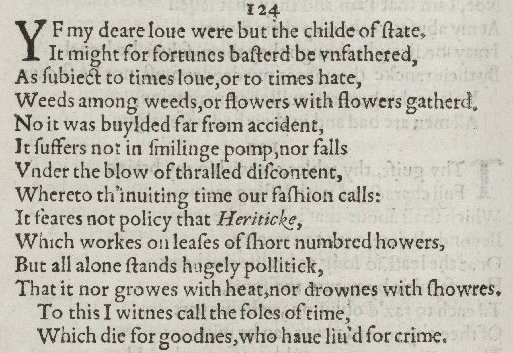
- Sonnet 124 in the 1609 Quarto
Q1
Q2
Q3
C
If my dear love were but the child of state,
It might for Fortune’s bastard be unfather’d,
As subject to Time’s love or to Time’s hate,
Weeds among weeds, or flowers with flowers gather’d.
No, it was builded far from accident;
It suffers not in smiling pomp, nor falls
Under the blow of thralled discontent,
Whereto the inviting time our fashion calls:
It fears not policy, that heretic,
Which works on leases of short-number’d hours,
But all alone stands hugely politic,
That it nor grows with heat nor drowns with showers.
To this I witness call the fools of time,
Which die for goodness, who have liv’d for crime.
—William Shakespeare
4
8
12
14

Sonnet 124 is one of 154 sonnets written by the English playwright and poet William Shakespeare. It's a member of the Fair Youth sequence, in which a poet expresses his love towards a young man.

== Overview ==
This sonnet observes the poet's personal transition on his interpretation of love. The speaker is no longer referring to "Fair Youth" when he utters the word 'love'. Rather, the poet has come to realize his own shortsightedness in his obsession with youth's materialism. The materialism of youth demonstrates the large issue at hand for this sonnet, the political and human state.

References to the political world of Shakespeare's time are littered throughout this sonnet. As literary scholar Murray Krieger states "Shakespeare is not likely to overlook the possibilities of metaphorical extension". The idea of that state is held highly in this sonnet, "primarily it functions in the majestic world of sovereignty, the summit of political hierarchy". The poet, however, realizes the fragility of the state as even the state is "subject to Time's love or to Time's hate" (124.3). The English state during Shakespeare's life was ruled by Queen Elizabeth, who was regarded as high in virtue, intelligence and status. However, throughout Europe political assassinations ruled the continent and Elizabeth was not exempt. She continually evaded numerous attempts at her life. The sonnet extends out from the state as a political feature to "envelop the contingencies of the human condition, the generic 'accident' of line 5". Shakespeare does this to show the linkages between the physical state of a nation as well as the 'state' of it populous. Once the speaker demonstrates this link, "'state' and 'accident' are finally one, so that the instabilities of the political condition may be read back into the human state at large – or at least the human state without love"

== Structure ==
Sonnet 124 is an English or Shakespearean sonnet. The English sonnet has three quatrains, followed by a final rhyming couplet. It follows the typical rhyme scheme of the form abab cdcd efef gg and is composed in iambic pentameter, a type of poetic metre based on five pairs of metrically weak/strong syllabic positions. The 6th line exemplifies a regular iambic pentameter:

×   /  ×    /  ×    / ×    /     ×   / 
It suffers not in smiling pomp, nor falls (124.6)

Many metrical variants occur in this poem. Line 4 contains two of the most common: an initial reversal and a final extrametrical syllable or feminine ending:

 /    × ×    /     ×    /      ×     / ×    / (×) 
Weeds among weeds, or flowers with flowers gather'd. (124.4)

/ = ictus, a metrically strong syllabic position. × = nonictus. (×) = extrametrical syllable.

Line 2 (as required by the rhyme scheme) also has a feminine ending. An initial reversal also occurs in line 7, with potential initial reversals occurring in lines 5, 11, and 12.

Line 3 contains two occurrences of the rightward movement of an ictus (resulting in a four-position figure, × × / /, sometimes referred to as a minor ionic):

×   /  ×    ×  /      /   ×   ×  /      / 
As subject to Time's love or to Time's hate, (124.3)

Minor ionics are also potentially present in lines 1 and 10.

The meter demands a few variant pronunciations: in line 4 "flowers" first functions as one, then as two syllables. Line 7's "thrallèd" is two syllables, and line 8's "th'inviting" is three.

This sonnet's form, like many other of Shakespeare's sonnets, uses the two-part structure of a typical Petrarchan sonnet in which, "eight lines are logically or metaphorically set against the last six [and] an octave-generalization will be followed by a particular sestet-application, an octave question will be followed by a sestet answer or at least a quatrain answer before the summarizing couplet". In Sonnet 124 the volta occurs in the eleventh and twelfth line, though arguable there could be two voltas in this sonnet—as there are at least two times in the poem where a new phrase of ideas is put forth. The first quatrain describes what the speakers' love would be like if it was simply a result of circumstance. There is then a change in thought as the second quatrain begins to attack the fickle state of the world in which the speaker and addressee reside where there is a lack of enduring resolve found wanting in politics, love, and fashion. The third quatrain continues with the description of the heretical society in which they live, but then presents the idea that the speaker's love "alone stands" against time, which is then supported by the appeal to witnesses in the ending couplet.

== Context ==
Shakespeare places Sonnet 124 towards the end of the Fair Youth section of sonnets which are addressed to or concern a young man. Over the course of this first section the speaker "tells a 'high' story of devotion, in the course of which the poet discovers that the reality of his love is the love itself rather than anything he receives from the beloved". Shakespeare accomplishes this through a three cycled love phase witnessed within this "Fair Youth" section. The first cycle sees the poet being confident in "Youth's" love, where the poet "feels that his genius as a poet is being released by [youth's love]". However, as this first cycle is completed and the second begins, youth has taken the poet's mistress and has created a rival poet. This causes the poet to become focused on his own old age and his love's winter. The final cycle witnesses the poet's rebirth, where in Sonnet 97 "a great rush of coming-of-spring images" flood the poem. This final portion of the poet's love cycle is where Sonnet 124 is positioned. Within this final section "[The poet] replaces reproach with self-reproach, or, more accurately, he replaces disillusionment with self-knowledge, and gradually finds the possession of what he has struggled for, not in the youth as a separate person, but in the love that unites him with the youth".

Another alternate contextual interpretation of this sonnet can be explained by Leslie Hotson. In the previous sonnet, 123, the speaker addresses time by stating "Thy pyramids built up with newer might / To me are nothing novel". Shakespearean critic Leslie Hotson argues that the speaker in 123 is unimpressed by Time, which she claims to be a prince of Shakespeare's time. Hotson states that this prince is referred to in Sonnet 124 where "This 'fortune's bastard', this victim of the 'time's hate', is ... King Henri III of France". The atrocities that are described within Sonnet 124 parallel actions that King Henri III committed against his people as "The first great 'accident' (line 5) or misfortune that befell [Henri III] was Paris's famous Day of Barricades". Ultimately, Hotson argues that "the blow of tralled discontent" (Sonnet 124.7) was the speaker's reaction against a prince "as strong as his love, Shakespeare calls to witness the English fools of the inviting time, who die 'for their religion', having lived to murder their Queen". This interpretation becomes one of praise for the speaker's queen, which is clearly an "affirmation of the strength of his love voice ... of every true-born Englishman in the preservation of his Queen from all the treacherous attempts on her life". Shakespeare allows this speaker to praise the Queen as reference to the numerous failed "conspiracy and other plots of assassination" that Queen Elizabeth successfully evaded; effectively making "love untouched by assassins' attempts".

== Analysis of key terms and themes ==
=== Quatrain one ===
If my dear love were but the child of state,
It might for Fortune's bastard be unfather'd,
As subject to Time's love or to Time's hate,
Weeds among weeds, or flowers with flowers gather'd.

Shakespeare critic Eugene Wright suggests in his book The Structure of Shakespeare's Sonnets that in the first four lines of Sonnet 124 the speaker puts forth a hypothetical; if the speakers' love were the product of circumstance, then it would have no strong foundations and would be "Fortune's bastard". Being "unfather'd" the love would then be subject to "Time's love or to Times' hate". The next set of lines then alludes to the personification of Time found in Sonnet 123, in which Time has a scythe (Sonnet 123. 14). In Sonnet 124, the scythe used by Time subjects its victims to either "Times hate" by putting "weeds among weeds" or to "Time's love" by gathering "flowers with flowers". While this interpretation is valid, other critics have interpreted the phrase "child of state" differently. Beeching, in his introduction to The Sonnets of Shakespeare, also understands "state" to refer to circumstance and accident; another critic, Dowden, in his work The Sonnets of William Shakespeare, believes it to mean "born of place and power". In his notes to Shakespeare's Sonnets, editor Gollanz believes it to refer to the earl of Southampton having been a ward of Lord Burghley and therefore a "child of state".

The rhyming words in this quatrain are "state" with "hate" and "unfather'd" with "gathered". "State", a political term, is coupled with "hate"—foreshadowing the speakers' negative descriptions of the political world in later lines. "Unfather'd"/ "gathered" suggests that love that does not have a firm and fixed foundation may by subject to whim and exploited/gathered by others. Eugene Patrick Wright maintains that the argument of this quatrain is that "Love based upon pleasure or on political, psychological, or sociological needs has no constancy, depending on the relative nature of its foundations."

=== Quatrain two ===
No, it was builded far from accident;
It suffers not in smiling pomp, nor falls
Under the blow of thralled discontent,
Whereto th' inviting time our fashion calls:

The second quatrain argues against the hypothetical "if" that the speaker's "dear love" is the "child of state". The speaker's love was created where it cannot be scathed by unpredictable events, an "accident", the "slings and arrows of outrageous Fortune" (Hamlet Act III. Sc.i 3). The sonnet shifts to criticizing the transitory nature of the society in which the speaker and addressee exist. Love is not subject to, "the whims of the powerful, the anger of tyrants, or the fads of mere fashion". In a historical context, in The Sonnets of Shakespeare, Raymond Alden suggests that, "The time referred to is unmistakably that after the ascension of James; and the gunpowder plot is such a remarkable instance of a plot to strike a 'blow of thralled discontent'. This is also supported by Lee who concurs in his analysis in Shakespeare's Sonnets. A Reproduction in Facsimile of the First Edition (1609). With Introduction and Bibliography by Sidney Lee that the "time" being alluded to mirrors the political unrest that characterized the last decade of Queen Elizabeth's reign and the first decade of King James I's reign.

The rhyming words in this quatrain are "accident" and "discontent", and "falls" and "calls". "Accident"/ "Discontent" builds on the theme introduced in the first quatrain that love that is accidental/foundation-less will lead to unhappiness/discontent. "Falls"/"Calls" are words that suggest dependency. If someone falls, they must use something to catch themselves and when someone "calls" they are reliant upon another to answer.

=== Quatrain three ===
It fears not policy, that heretic,
Which works on leases of short-number'd hours,
But all alone stands hugely politic,
That it nor grows with heat, nor drowns with showers.

In the third quatrain there is a continuation from the second quatrain in the argument that because of "my dear love's" constant nature "it" does not fear "policy". Policy, is "self-serving political pragmatism"—"that heretic/ Which works on leases of short-number'd hours". In contrast to the fashion and politics of the time the speaker's love "all alone stands hugely politic". Dowden interprets this as meaning that Love if infinitely prudent, and therefore, "It" (the speaker's love) is the ideal policy because it is not transitory in nature, such as the policies of the governing body. There is again imagery of nature in the description that the love neither "grows with heat, nor drowns with showers", like a plant of flower would. "Being beyond the physical, it is not affected by the inconstancy of things physical".

=== Couplet ===
To this I witness call the fools of time,
Which die for goodness, who have lived for crime.

Much has been made out of Sonnet 124's ending couplet. In The Sonnets of Shakespeare, edited by Raymond Alden, one critic describes them as, "hopelessly obscure". The couplet calls forth the evidence the speaker has for his claim. As noted by Eugene Wright, the words used in the couplet, "I witness call", "die", "crime" use trial imagery to call forth evidence to support the sonnet's argument. Those called to "witness" in this trail scene are the "fools of Time" – a phrase that has been dissected by numerous critics.

In his work, The Secret Drama of Shakespeare's Sonnets, Gerald Massey argues that the allusion of the "fools of Time" called to witness is no doubt, "directed to Essex and his companions". Critic Tyler (found in Raymond Alden's The Sonnets of Shakespeare) further supports this, claiming, "These expressions ... become intelligible when considered as referring to Essex and his companions, and to the consequences of the rebellion," also noting that during his life Essex was known as the "good Earl", but died guilty of treason. The logic of assigning Essex or other exemplars of traitors as the identity of the "fools of Time" is also supported by Wright in his analysis in The Structure of Shakespeare's Sonnets where he argues that the phrase of dying for "goodness, who have lived for crime" demonstrates "human propensity to think of moral propriety only when death is imminent". He links this idea back to Sonnet 116, arguing that those who live their lives in sin and "crime" and then repent at the end of their lives to "die for goodness" have discovered that "Love's not Time's fool" (Sonnet116 ).

The afore mentioned critics are consistent with the point argued by Stephen Booth in Shakespeare's Sonnets / Edited with Analytic Commentary by Stephen Booth, that the "fools" are not necessarily "witnesses", but rather "exhibits" whose deaths are called to offer a cautionary tale of those whose crimes have caught up to them. In his article "Politics, Heresy, and Martyrdom in Shakespeare's Sonnet 124" John Klause argues against this view, noting that " One does not 'call' exhibits, but witnesses. It is more likely that the fools are being summoned to testify from beyond the grave ... If the foolish are to speak, it is to be on behalf of constant love". He believes that the most plausible identity for those who have died as exemplars of constant love are the martyrs, arguing, "But martyrs will have chosen a foolish goodness over a wise compliance that would have saved them from crime. In the fatal choice they evoke admiration in a poet who feels that their love in some way establishes a precedent for his own". While this explanation certainly seems plausible, Russell Fraser in his work Young Shakespeare claims that, "Martyrs, Protestant or Catholic, were only grist to Shakespeare's mill." To prove Klause's logic would require more conclusive evidence of Shakespeare's sympathy for martyrs.

The Jesuit conspirators, Guy Fawkes, the Earl of Essex, the conspirators of the Gunpowder Plot, and others have been suggested as the possible historical identities for "fools of Time". However, there is no clear evidence that any of these people were meant to be specifically referenced in this sonnet. As Wright suggests, "had Shakespeare wanted to point at some particular individual or group, he likely could have found the words to do so. What the sonnet does is to use evidence adequate to support a general idea".

== Bibliography ==
- Blackmur, Richard P.; etc. (Edward Hubler; Northrop Frye; Leslie A. Fielder) "The Riddle of Shakespeare's Sonnets" Basic Books Inc.,U.S.; Stated First Edition (December 1962). ISBN 978-0-465-06987-3
- Hubler, Edward; "The Sense of Shakespeare's Sonnets" Hill & Wang (January 1962). ASIN: B0029Z00U4
- Felch, Susan M., Stump, Donald. "Elizabeth I and Her Age". New York: W.W. Norton & Company. 1st Edition. 2009
- Hotson, Leslie, "Mr. W.H." New York: Alfred A. Knopf. 1964.
- Wright, Eugene Patrick. "The Sonnets and Analyses." The Structure of Shakespeare's Sonnets. Lewiston, NY: Edwin Mellen, 1993. 314–15. Print

First edition and facsimile

- Shakespeare, William (1609). Shake-speares Sonnets: Never Before Imprinted. London: Thomas Thorpe.
- Lee, Sidney, ed. (1905). Shakespeares Sonnets: Being a reproduction in facsimile of the first edition. Oxford: Clarendon Press. OCLC 458829162.

Variorum editions

- Alden, Raymond Macdonald, ed. (1916). The Sonnets of Shakespeare. Boston: Houghton Mifflin Harcourt. OCLC 234756.
- Rollins, Hyder Edward, ed. (1944). A New Variorum Edition of Shakespeare: The Sonnets [2 Volumes]. Philadelphia: J. B. Lippincott & Co. OCLC 6028485. — Volume I and Volume II at the Internet Archive

Modern critical editions

- Atkins, Carl D., ed. (2007). Shakespeare's Sonnets: With Three Hundred Years of Commentary. Madison: Fairleigh Dickinson University Press. ISBN 978-0-8386-4163-7. OCLC 86090499.
- Booth, Stephen, ed. (2000) [1st ed. 1977]. Shakespeare's Sonnets (Rev. ed.). New Haven: Yale Nota Bene. ISBN 0-300-01959-9. OCLC 2968040.
- Burrow, Colin, ed. (2002). The Complete Sonnets and Poems. The Oxford Shakespeare. Oxford: Oxford University Press. ISBN 978-0192819338. OCLC 48532938.
- Duncan-Jones, Katherine, ed. (2010) [1st ed. 1997]. Shakespeare's Sonnets. Arden Shakespeare, third series (Rev. ed.). London: Bloomsbury. ISBN 978-1-4080-1797-5. OCLC 755065951. — 1st edition at the Internet Archive
- Evans, G. Blakemore, ed. (1996). The Sonnets. The New Cambridge Shakespeare. Cambridge: Cambridge University Press. ISBN 978-0521294034. OCLC 32272082.
- Kerrigan, John, ed. (1995) [1st ed. 1986]. The Sonnets ; and, A Lover's Complaint. New Penguin Shakespeare (Rev. ed.). Penguin Books. ISBN 0-14-070732-8. OCLC 15018446.
- Mowat, Barbara A.; Werstine, Paul, eds. (2006). Shakespeare's Sonnets & Poems. Folger Shakespeare Library. New York: Washington Square Press. ISBN 978-0743273282. OCLC 64594469.
- Orgel, Stephen, ed. (2001). The Sonnets. The Pelican Shakespeare (Rev. ed.). New York: Penguin Books. ISBN 978-0140714531. OCLC 46683809.
- Vendler, Helen, ed. (1997). The Art of Shakespeare's Sonnets. Cambridge, Massachusetts: The Belknap Press of Harvard University Press. ISBN 0-674-63712-7. OCLC 36806589.
