= Roger Stritmatter =

US academic

Roger A. Stritmatter (born 1958) is a Professor of Humanities at Coppin State University and the former general editor of Brief Chronicles, a delayed open access journal covering the Shakespeare authorship question from 2009 to 2016, now the Brief Chronicles Book series (2019-present). He was a founder of the modern Shakespeare Fellowship, an organization that promotes Edward de Vere, 17th Earl of Oxford, as the true author of the works of William Shakespeare. He is one of the leading modern-day advocates of the Oxfordian theory of Shakespeare authorship, and has been called the “first professional Oxfordian scholar”.

Stritmatter was educated at Evergreen State College (B.A. 1981) and the New School for Social Research (M.A., 1988). In 2001 he was awarded a PhD in comparative literature from the University of Massachusetts Amherst on the basis of a dissertation that assumed the authorship of Edward de Vere and accepted the work of Oxfordians J. Thomas Looney, B. M. Ward, and Charlton Ogburn, Jr., as sources on a par with peer-reviewed academic scholarship. It comprised a study of 1,043 marked passages found in de Vere's Geneva Bible, which is now owned by the Folger Shakespeare Library. Stritmatter claimed to find that 246 of those (23.6 percent) appear in Shakespeare's works as a theme, an allusion, or a quotation, which is presented as evidence for the Oxfordian theory.

In 2007, Stritmatter and writer Lynne Kositsky published an essay in the Review of English Studies proposing that William Strachey’s eyewitness account of the 1609 Sea Venture shipwreck on the island of Bermuda, A True Reportory of the Wracke and Redemption of Sir Thomas Gates, Knight, was misdated and largely plagiarized, and arguing that sources earlier than Strachey's letter account for Shakespeare's imagery and wording. The narrative, dated 1610 but not published until 1625, is generally accepted as a source for Shakespeare’s The Tempest, and a composition date later than the first recorded performance of the play would disqualify it as a possible source for the play.

== Selected works ==
- The Marginalia of Edward de Vere's Geneva Bible: Providential Discovery, Literary Reasoning, and Historical Consequence. University of Massachusetts PhD Dissertation, February 2001.
- "A Law Case in Verse: Venus and Adonis and the Authorship Question." University of Tennessee Law Review 72:1 (Fall 2004): 171-219.
- With Lynne Kositsky, "Shakespeare and the Voyagers Revisited" Review of English Studies 58:236 (September 2007): 447-472.
- With Lynne Kositsky, On the Date, Sources and Design of Shakespeare's The Tempest, McFarland & Company, 2013.
