= Edward Hall =

16th-century English lawyer, politician, and historian

Member of Parliament for Bridgnorth
- In office 16 January 1542 – 31 January 1547

Common Serjeant of London
- In office 17 March 1533 – 2 June 1535
- Preceded by: John Onley
- Succeeded by: Sir Robert Southwell

Personal details
- Born: Unknown date, c. 1496 Poultry, London, England
- Died: c. May 1547 (aged 50–51) London, Middlesex, England
- Resting place: St Benet Sherehog, London
- Parent(s): John Hall, Katherine Geddyng
- Education: Eton College; King's College
- Occupation: Lawyer, historian, politician
- Inn of Court: Hon. Society of Gray's Inn
- Notable work: Hall's Chronicle (1548)

Edward Hall (c. 1496 – c. May 1547) was an English lawyer and historian, best known for his The Union of the Two Noble and Illustre Families of Lancastre and Yorke—commonly known as Hall's Chronicle—first published in 1548. He was also several times a member of the Parliament of England.

== Family ==
Edward Hall, born in 1497, was the son of John Hall (died 22 February 1528) of Northall in Kynnersley, Shropshire, a London grocer and Merchant of the Staple who resided in the parish of St Mildred in the Poultry. The surname Hall appears in the records of the Worshipful Company of Grocers for several generations prior to Hall's birth, suggesting that members of the family had been London merchants for some time. Hall's father served as Warden of the Grocers in 1512.

According to some sources, Hall's mother, Katherine Geddyng, was the daughter and coheir of Thomas Geddyng of Norfolk, while according to others she was the daughter of John Geddyng, great-grandson of William Geddyng of Lackford, Suffolk, and Mirabel Aspale, daughter and heiress of Sir John de Aspale. Katherine (née Geddying) Hall's burial on 19 June 1557 in the church of St Benet Sherehog was recorded by the diarist Henry Machyn.

She appointed as executor of her will Sir William Garrard, and as supervisor Dame Joan Warren, the second wife of Sir Ralph Warren, Lord Mayor of London. According to some sources, Katherine was the 'Mistress Hall' who in 1555 was imprisoned in Newgate for her faith under Queen Mary Tudor, and with whom the religious reformer John Bradford corresponded. Hall had a brother, William, who survived him, but no other known brothers or sisters.

=== Marriage and issue ===
There is no evidence as to whether Hall ever married. His will, made in 1546–1547, makes no mention of a wife or children, and the only family members named are his brother, William, whom he appoints as executor of his will, and his mother, whom he appoints as overseer.

In his will he requested burial in the Greyfriars, London, but he was instead buried in the church of St Benet Sherehog, which was subsequently destroyed in the Great Fire of London in 1666 and not rebuilt. He left all his books in French and English to his brother, William, and his manuscript of his chronicle to Richard Grafton, entrusting him with its publication.

== Career ==
Hall began his education at Eton College. In 1514 he was admitted to King's College, Cambridge, graduating BA in 1518. At about the time of Hall's graduation from university, the second son of Robert Fabyan (died 1513) became apprentice to Hall's father, and according to Herman, it was perhaps through this connection that Hall developed what became a lifelong interest in chronicling the events of English history. Hall was a student at Gray's Inn by 1521, and became a lawyer by profession. He was Autumn Reader at his Inn in 1533, and Lent Reader in 1540.

According to Herman, Hall may have been first elected to Parliament as early as 1523. He was elected to represent Much Wenlock in 1529, and represented the borough again in 1539. In 1542, and again in 1545, he was elected for Bridgnorth. Hall served as Common Serjeant of London from 17 March 1533 to 2 June 1535, and as Under-Sheriff from 2 June 1535 until his death.

=== Chronicle ===
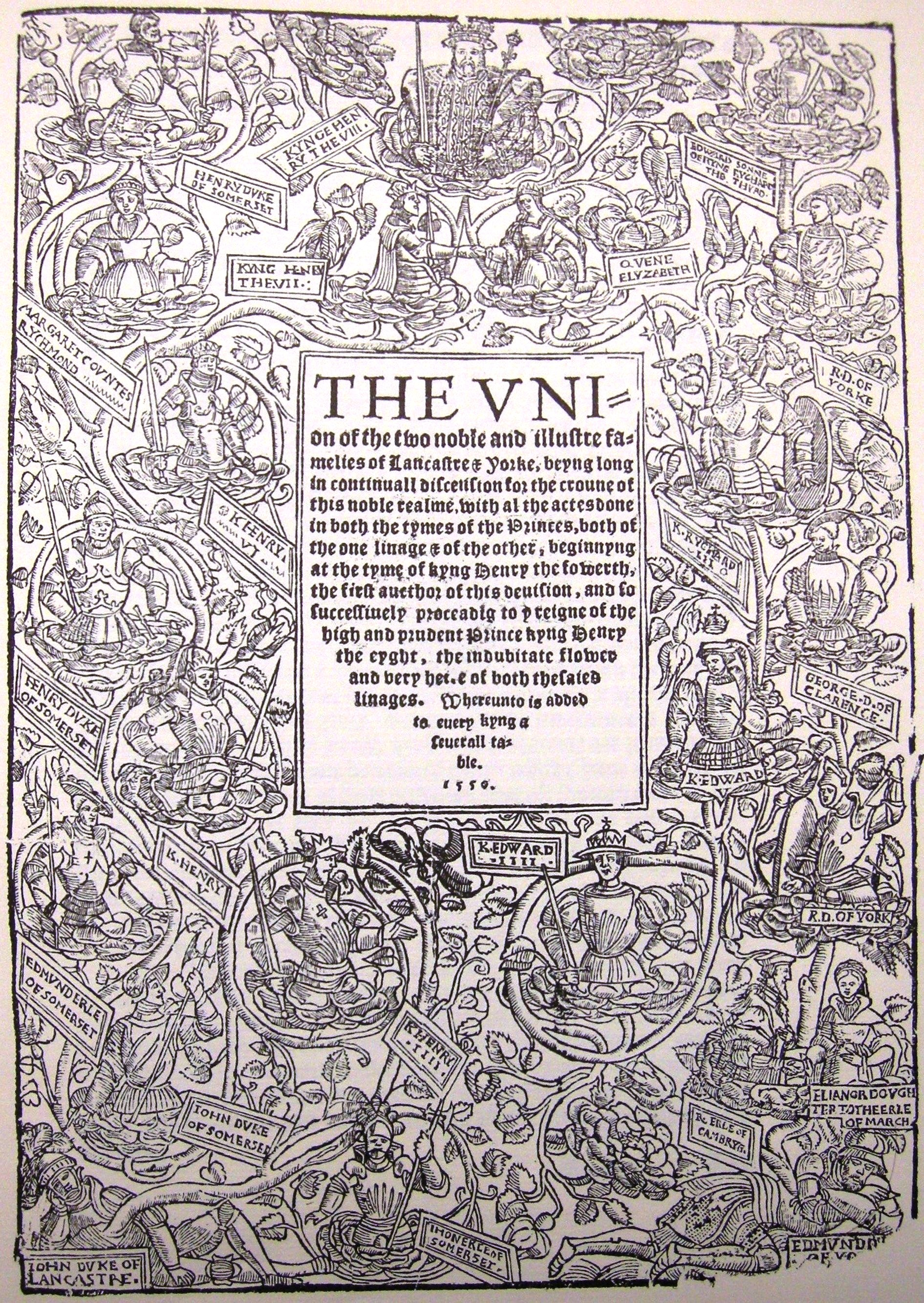
The 1550 edition of Hall's Union of the Two Noble and Illustre Families of Lancastre and Yorke, depicting the descent of Henry VIII from John of Gaunt and Edmund of Langley

Hall's best-known work, The Union of the Two Noble and Illustre Families of Lancastre and Yorke, commonly called Hall's Chronicle, was published by the printer Richard Grafton in 1548, the year after Hall's death. A revised edition (printed for Grafton by Richard Jugge) appeared in 1550. Both included a continuation from 1532 compiled by Grafton from the author's notes. The only complete modern edition, entitled Hall's Chronicle, Containing the History of England During the Reign of Henry IV and the Succeeding Monarchs to the End of the Reign of Henry VIII, was prepared under the supervision of Sir Henry Ellis and published in 1809. A reprint was issued in 1965. In 1904, the concluding chapter dealing with the reign of Henry VIII was edited by Charles Whibley.

The Chronicle begins with the accession of Henry IV to the English throne in 1399; it follows the strife between the houses of Lancaster and York, and with Grafton's continuation carries the story down to the death of Henry VIII in 1547. Hall presents the policy of this king in a very favourable light and shows his own sympathy with the Protestants. He has a lawyer's respect for ceremonial of all kinds, and his pages are often adorned and encumbered with the pageantry and material garniture of the story.

The value of the Chronicle in its early stages is not great, but increases when dealing with the reign of Henry VII and is considerable for the reign of Henry VIII. To the historian it furnishes what is evidently the testimony of an eyewitness on several matters of importance which are neglected by other narrators, and to the student of literature it is of interest as one of the prime sources of Shakespeare's history plays.

On 22 June 1940, Alan Keen, a dealer in antiquarian books, discovered an extensively annotated copy of Hall's Chronicle among the contents of a library from outside London which he had just purchased. Keen considered that the marginal annotations, most of which are found in the chapters covering the reigns of Henry IV, Henry V, and Henry VI, were made by Shakespeare. Keen published his findings in two journal articles, and in a book co-authored with Roger Lubbock in 1954, The Annotator. After his death Keen left the volume in the hands of trustees, who placed it in the British Library, where until 2007 it was catalogued as Loan MS 61.
