= Peter Milward =

Jesuit priest and literary scholar

Father Peter Milward, SJ
- Born: Peter Christopher Milward; 12 October 1925; London, England
- Died: 16 August 2017 (aged 91); Tokyo, Japan
- Occupations: Jesuit priest; academic, educator and scholar
- Writing career
- Period: 20th century

Father Peter Milward, SJ (12 October 1925 – 16 August 2017) was a Jesuit priest and literary scholar. He was emeritus professor of English Literature at Sophia University in Tokyo and a leading figure in scholarship on English Renaissance literature. He was chair of the Renaissance Institute at Sophia University from its inception in 1974 until it was closed down in 2014 and director of the Renaissance Centre from its start in 1984 until it was closed down in 2002. He primarily published on the works of William Shakespeare and Gerard Manley Hopkins.

== Life ==
=== Education ===
Born in London in 1925, Milward was educated at Wimbledon College, entering the Society of Jesus in 1943 at the age of 18. He went on to study Classics and English Literature in Heythrop College and Campion Hall, Oxford. In Oxford he made a point of attending the lectures of C. S. Lewis and the meetings of the Socratic Club. In 1954 he was sent to Japan, where he learnt the Japanese language and completed his study of Theology. He was ordained to the priesthood in 1960.

=== Academic career ===
Milward joined the Department of English Literature at Sophia University in 1962. In time he became vice-chairman of the Renaissance Institute at Sophia University, and editor of the institute's Renaissance Monographs. He was the first director of the university's Renaissance Centre, opened in 1984. After his retirement he continued to provide lectures at the Renaissance Centre. He is best known in Japan as the author of a series of readers and textbooks for the study of the English language and English literature, and as an essayist on comparative culture.

Outside Japan, he is best known to academics as a specialist in Renaissance literature who, largely on the basis of research in the Huntington Library, compiled two fundamental aids for the study of religion in early modern England: Religious Controversies of the Elizabethan Age (1977) and Religious Controversies of the Jacobean Age (1978). Milward was also a book reviewer for Monumenta Nipponica. After his retirement he was one of the leading proponents of the view that Shakespeare was a crypto-Catholic. He wrote regularly for the St. Austin Review.

== Select list of publications ==
=== As author ===
==== General works ====
- Christian Themes in English Literature. Tokyo: Kenkyusha, 1967. LCCN 75304081. Reprinted Folcroft: Folcroft Press, 1970.
- Fortunate Failures: an Autobiography of Error. Azuma Shobo, 1975.
- Oddities in Modern Japan: Observations of an Outsider [Nihonjin no Nihon shirazu]. Tokyo: Hokuseido Press, 1980.
- The Bible as Literature. Tokyo: Kenkyusha, 1983. ISBN 4-327-42034-4.
- An Encyclopedia of Flora and Fauna in English and American Literature. Lewiston, N.Y., and Lampeter: Edwin Mellen Press, 1992. ISBN 0-7734-9539-8.
- A Poetic Approach to Ecology. Ann Arbor, MI : Sapientia Press of Ave Maria University, 2004. ISBN 1-932589-06-6
- What is a University?. London: Shepheard-Walwyn, 2006. ISBN 0-85683-233-2.
- The English Reformation : from tragic reality to dramatic representation. Oxford, UK : Family Publications, 2007. ISBN 978-1-871217-71-1
- The Secret Life of Insects: an Entomological Alphabet. New Brunswick, N.J.: Transaction Publishers, 2009. ISBN 1-4128-1011-6

==== On Renaissance literature ====
- Shakespeare's Religious Background. Bloomington: Indiana University Press, 1973. ISBN 0-253-35200-2.
- "Teaching Shakespeare in Japan", Shakespeare Quarterly 25:2 (1974), pp. 228–233. Available on JSTOR to subscribers.
- "The Jewel-Harding Controversy", Albion 6:4 (1974), pp. 320–341. Available on JSTOR to subscribers.
- Biblical Themes in Shakespeare. Renaissance Monographs 3. Tokyo: Renaissance Institute, Sophia University, 1975.
- An Anthology of Medieval Thinkers: Prolegomena to Medieval and Renaissance Literature. Renaissance Monographs 7. Tokyo: Renaissance Institute, Sophia University, 1975.
- Religious Controversies of the Elizabethan Age: a Survey of Printed Sources. With a foreword by G.R. Elton. Lincoln, Nebraska, and London: University of Nebraska Press, 1977. ISBN 0-8032-0923-1.
- Religious Controversies of the Jacobean Age: a Survey of Printed Sources. Lincoln, Nebraska, and London: University of Nebraska Press, 1978. ISBN 0-8032-3058-3.
- The Catholicism of Shakespeare's Plays. Tokyo: Renaissance Institute, Sophia University, 1997. Reprinted Southampton: Saint Austin Press, 1997. ISBN 1-901157-10-5.
- Shakespeare's Apocalypse. Saint Austin Literature & Ideas series. London: Saint Austin Press, 2000. ISBN 1-901157-32-6.
- "Shakespeare's Secular Bible: A Modern Commentary", Logos: A Journal of Catholic Thought and Culture 4:3 (2001), pp. 108–114.
- Shakespeare's Meta-drama: Hamlet and Macbeth. Renaissance Monographs 30. Tokyo: Renaissance Institute, Sophia University, 2003.
- Shakespeare's Meta-drama: Othello and King Lear. Renaissance Monographs 31. Tokyo: Renaissance Institute, Sophia University, 2003.
- Shakespeare the Papist. Ann Arbor, MI: Sapientia Press, 2005. ISBN 1-932589-21-X.
- Jacobean Shakespeare. Naples, FL: Sapientia Press of Ave Maria University, 2007. ISBN 1-932589-33-3.
- Elizabethan Shakespeare. Naples, FL: Sapientia Press of Ave Maria University, 2008. ISBN 1-932589-47-3.
- Elizabethan Controversialists. Campbell, CA: FastPencil, 2012.

==== On modern literature ====
- A Commentary on G. M. Hopkins' "The Wreck of the Deutschland". Tokyo: Hokuseido Press, 1968. Reprinted Lewiston: E. Mellen Press, 1991. ISBN 0-88946-584-3.
- A Commentary on the Sonnets of G.M. Hopkins. Tokyo: Hokuseido Press, 1969. Reprinted London: C. Hurst, 1970. Reprinted Chicago: Loyola University Press, 1985. ISBN 0-8294-0494-5.
- Landscape and Inscape: Vision and Inspiration in Hopkins's Poetry. London: Elek, 1975. ISBN 0-236-40000-2.
- The Heart of Natsume Soseki: first impressions of his novels; with notes by Kii Nakano. [Tokyo]: Azuma Shobo, 1982.
- A Challenge to C. S. Lewis. London: Associated University Presses, 1995. ISBN 0-8386-3568-7.
- A Lifetime with Hopkins. Ave Maria: Sapientia Press, 2005. ISBN 1-932589-22-8.

=== As editor ===
==== Literary volumes ====
- G. K. Chesterton, Essays on Shakespeare. Kenkyusha Pocket English series 233. Tokyo: Kenkyusha, 1968.
- John Donne, Holy Sonnets, edited with notes by Peter Milward and Shonosuke Ishii. Kenkyusha Pocket English Series 270. Tokyo: Kenkyusha, 1980.
- Natsume Sōseki, The Tower of London, translated and edited with introduction, commentary, and notes by Peter Milward and Kii Nakano. Brighton: In Print, 1992. ISBN 1-873047-90-8.

==== Academic volumes ====
- Readings of The Wreck: essays in commemoration of the centenary of G. M. Hopkins' "The Wreck of the Deutschland", edited by Peter Milward, assisted by Raymond Schoder. Chicago: Loyola University Press, 1976. ISBN 0-8294-0249-7.
- Poetry and Faith in the English Renaissance: essays in honour of Professor Toyohiko Tatsumi's seventieth birthday, edited by Peter Milward. Renaissance Monographs 13. Tokyo: Renaissance Institute, Sophia University, 1987.
- The Mutual Encounter of East and West, 1492–1992, edited by Peter Milward. Renaissance Monographs 19. Tokyo: Renaissance Institute, 1992.
- Portuguese Voyages to Asia and Japan in the Renaissance Period: proceedings of the international conference held at Sophia University, edited by Peter Milward. Renaissance Monographs 20. Tokyo: The Renaissance Institute, Sophia University, 1994.
