= Charles Sidney Beauclerk =

British Jesuit priest

Fr Charles Sidney de Vere Beauclerk SJ (1 January 1855 – 22 November 1934) was a Jesuit priest who attempted to turn the town of Holywell into the "Lourdes of Wales". He was also notable for his connection to the novelist Frederick Rolfe, and for his involvement in the Oxfordian theory of Shakespeare authorship.

== Early life ==
Beauclerk was the third child of Charles Beauclerk, a Fellow of Gonville and Caius College, Cambridge, and Joaquina Zamora, daughter of Don J M Zamora, Chief Magistrate of Cuba. Beauclerk (pronounced bo-clair) was a male line great-grandson of Topham Beauclerk, and consequently direct descendant of Charles Beauclerk, 1st Duke of St Albans, illegitimate son of Charles II and Nell Gwyn. He was also descended from Edward de Vere, 17th Earl of Oxford and Charles Spencer, 3rd Duke of Marlborough. Educated at Beaumont College, he became a Jesuit in 1875 and was ordained to the priesthood in 1888. One of his brothers, Henry Beauclerk, also became a Jesuit, serving as a missionary in British Guiana (now Guyana), and another brother, Robert Beauclerk, joined the Jesuits but left before completing his seminary training.

== Holywell ==
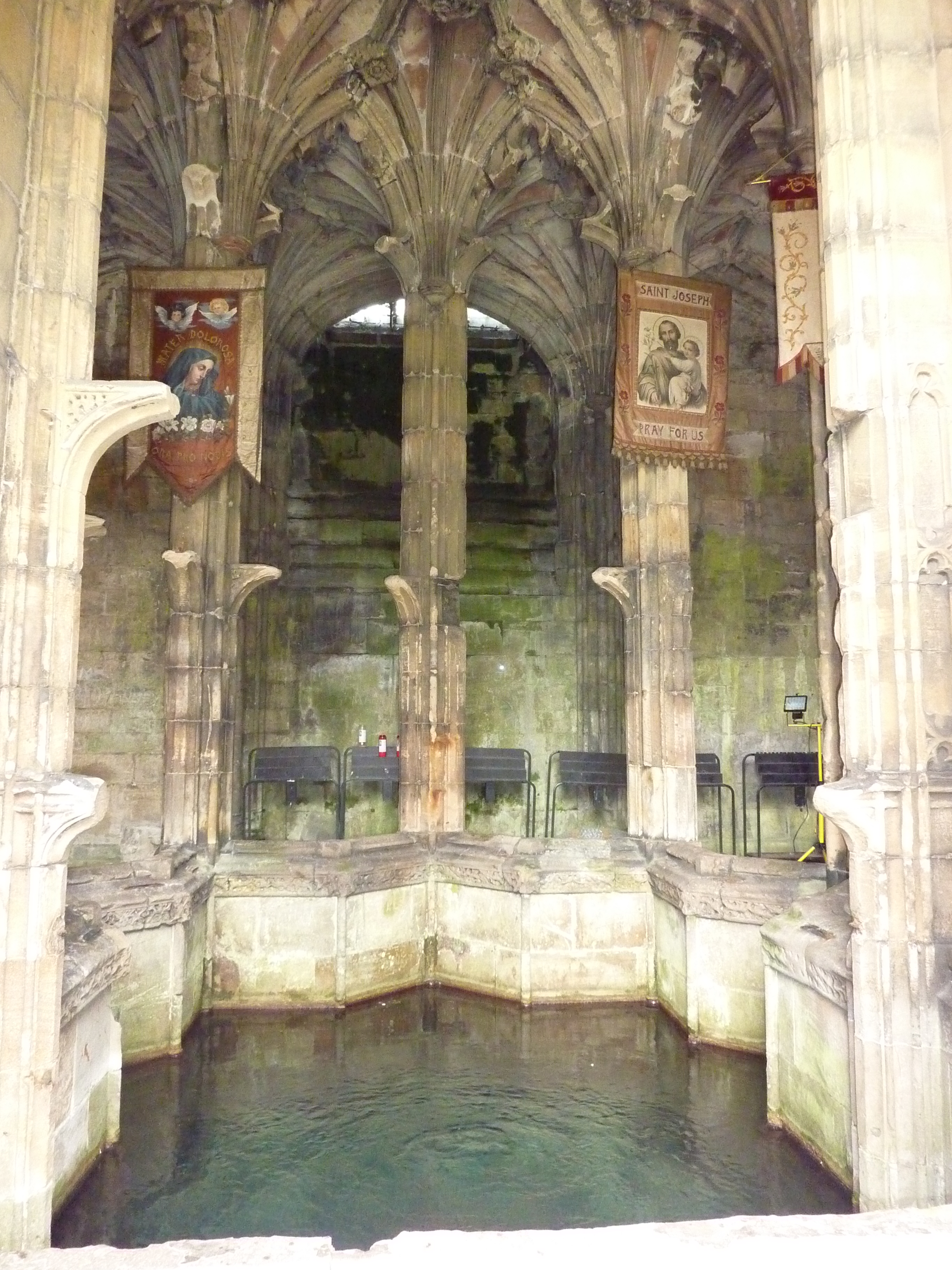
St. Winefride's Well, Holywell

Beauclerk was Parish Priest at Holywell in North Wales from 1890 to 1898. Holywell was named from St Winefride's Well, a holy well surrounded by a chapel. The well has been known since at least the Roman period, and has been a site of pilgrimage since about 660 when Saint Winefride was beheaded there. At the time of Beauclerk's arrival the town was in a state of apparently "terminal decay", with industrial decline and poor housing. Beauclerk intended to restore Holywell to its former status as a centre of Catholic pilgrimage, aspiring to "purify it with literature and art". He developed the Holywell processions, and promoted the events through a journal, the Holywell Record, bringing in a significant number of pilgrims. He was assisted by Father Fletcher who established the Guild of Our Lady of Ransom in the town and predicted that Holywell would become the "centre for the conversion of England" to Catholicism. Beauclerk also believed that this would soon occur. He promoted a beautification programme for the town, including church rebuilding and public decorative schemes. He also commissioned Catholic religious art, most notably a statue of Jesus as The Sacred Heart, which was transported through the town in a massive procession.

Beauclerk's assertions about conversion and his attempts to dominate the public space with Catholic imagery caused a backlash from Protestants, especially nonconformists. The heart from his Sacred Heart statue was removed. However, the increase in the number of pilgrims coming to the town was beneficial to local traders, a fact which mollified criticism.

=== Rolfe ===
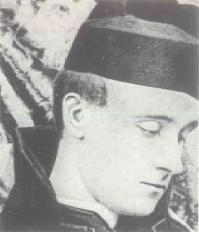
Frederick Rolfe

In April 1895, the writer Frederick Rolfe, then using the pseudonym "Mr Austin", arrived in Holywell and was engaged by Beauclerk to paint some new banners for use in the town's regular Catholic processions. Beauclerk allowed Rolfe to set up his studio in an unused schoolroom, and Rolfe took over as editor and chief writer for the Holywell Record. However, it was not long before Rolfe's relations with the parish priest began to deteriorate, and broke down altogether when Beauclerk rejected his request to be paid a hefty sum for painting the banners. Eventually Rolfe had to agree to a small fee of £50, but he used his control of the Holywell Record to attack Beauclerk relentlessly. By early 1897 Rolfe was drawing his every Holywell acquaintance into his feud with Beauclerk. Eventually the priest's position became untenable and the Jesuit Provincial decided to transfer him.

Beauclerk later recognised versions of himself in Rolfe's 1904 novel Hadrian the Seventh, in several characters. One is referred to as "that detestable and deceitful Blackcote" (p. 15), "a hare-brained and degenerate priest" (p. 30). There is also "Fr St Albans", the Jesuit General (p. 274), and "the bad priest" (p. 324). However, Beauclerk had the generosity to write and congratulate Rolfe when it was published.

After Beauclerk left, Holywell's capacity to attract pilgrims declined.

== Later life ==
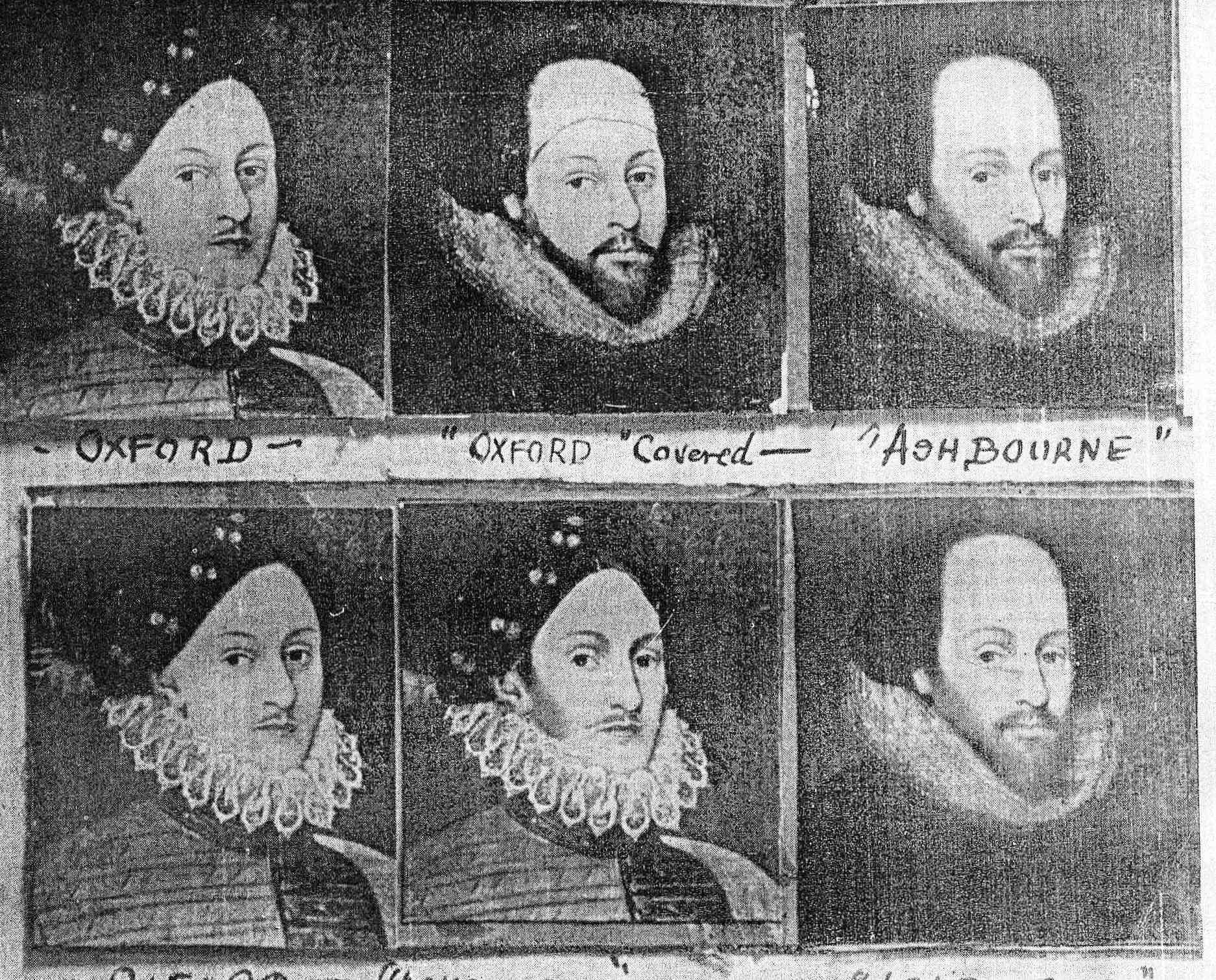
One of Beauclerk's composite image-sequences, mutating a portrait of de Vere into Shakespeare

After he left Holywell, Beauclerk served at several other Jesuit houses: the community of retired Jesuits at Boscombe in Bournemouth; Manresa House at Roehampton, Surrey; chaplain of the Services College in Malta; and finally the Jesuit church in Accrington in Lancashire.

In his later years his personal hobby was the accumulation of evidence to prove that his ancestor Edward de Vere, 17th Earl of Oxford, was the true author of Shakespeare's plays, an idea first suggested in 1920 by J. Thomas Looney. He was the first person to propose that de Vere was the subject of the Ashbourne portrait, an idea he passed to Looney's follower Percy Allen. According to Allen, Beauclerk created composite images by merging the established Welbeck portrait of de Vere with various known and alleged portraits of Shakespeare. In addition to the Ashbourne portrait, Beauclerk applied his method to the Grafton, Felton and Droeshout portraits. Allen believed that Beauclerk's method "shows them all to be portraits of the same man - Edward de Vere".
