= Hubert's Arthur =

Hubert's Arthur is an alternative history novel by the eccentric English writer Frederick Rolfe ('Baron Corvo') posthumously published by A. J. A. Symons in 1935. It started as a collaboration between Rolfe and Harry Pirie-Gordon, but in the end the latter only supplied the copious heraldic details pertaining to the characters.

In the novel, Arthur I, Duke of Brittany defeats his uncle John, King of England and rises to the English throne. With Henry III killed in combat by Arthur, Arthur is the king who faces the rebellion of Simon de Montfort in the novel's version of the Second Barons' War.

The novel is controversial for its antisemitism. It depicts the Jews of England offering Little Saint Hugh of Lincoln and other boys as human sacrifices.

== Plot ==
The novel is presented as the lengthy narrative of the aged Hubert de Burgh, Earl of Kent, who is supposed to have saved the life of Arthur I, Duke of Brittany and accompanied him on crusade to the Holy Land, where Arthur becomes King of Jerusalem and eventually returns to England, defeats his uncle King John of England and kills his son Henry Plantagenet (the historical Henry III) in single combat. The remainder of the book details the prosperous reign of King Arthur, his defeat of the Barons under Simon de Montfort, and his eventual miraculous death.

=== Historicity ===
Arthur was guarded by Hubert de Burgh at the Chateau de Falaise after captured by John in Battle of Mirebeau. According to contemporaneous chronicler Ralph of Coggeshall, John ordered two of his servants to blind and castrate the duke. De Burgh could not bring himself to let Arthur be mutilated. Fearful of John, de Burgh leaked news that Arthur had died of natural causes. The following year Arthur was transferred to Rouen, under the charge of William de Braose. Arthur vanished in April 1203, in the background of several military victories by Philip II of France against King John, presumably murdered by John.

Arthur's elder sister Eleanor, Fair Maid of Brittany, presumably captured along with him, was also imprisoned, albeit under honorable treatment as a princess. When Hubert acted as the regent of Henry III from 1219 to 1227, he showed no more special care to her than other periods, as well as in 1230 when he was appointed Constable of Bristol Castle, where Eleanor was held from 1224; in contrast, during his regency multiple instructions were made to add, appoint, monitor and change her guards and staff, and several certain expenses from 1225 to 1227 on locks and keys of Bristol Castle implied that she was once shut up in her tower or room.

== Publication and reception ==
After Rolfe's death in 1913, his works were relatively obscure. A. J. A. Symons read his novel Hadrian VII and was inspired to write a biography of Rolfe, published in 1934 as The Quest for Corvo: An Experiment in Biography. During his research, Symons also located and published as many of Rolfe's manuscripts as he could, including Hubert's Arthur. The book was advertised with the tagline "You have never read anything like this."

When first published, the novel was reviewed positively in the Herald of Wales. A review in The Observer was more mixed, saying that the novel's attempts at historical drama are often unintentionally humorous. It was also reviewed in The Age.

== Sources ==
- Jones, Dan (2014). The Plantagenets: The Warrior Kings and Queens Who Made England. Penguin Books.
