= Ashbourne portrait =

Painting falsely claimed to be of Shakespeare

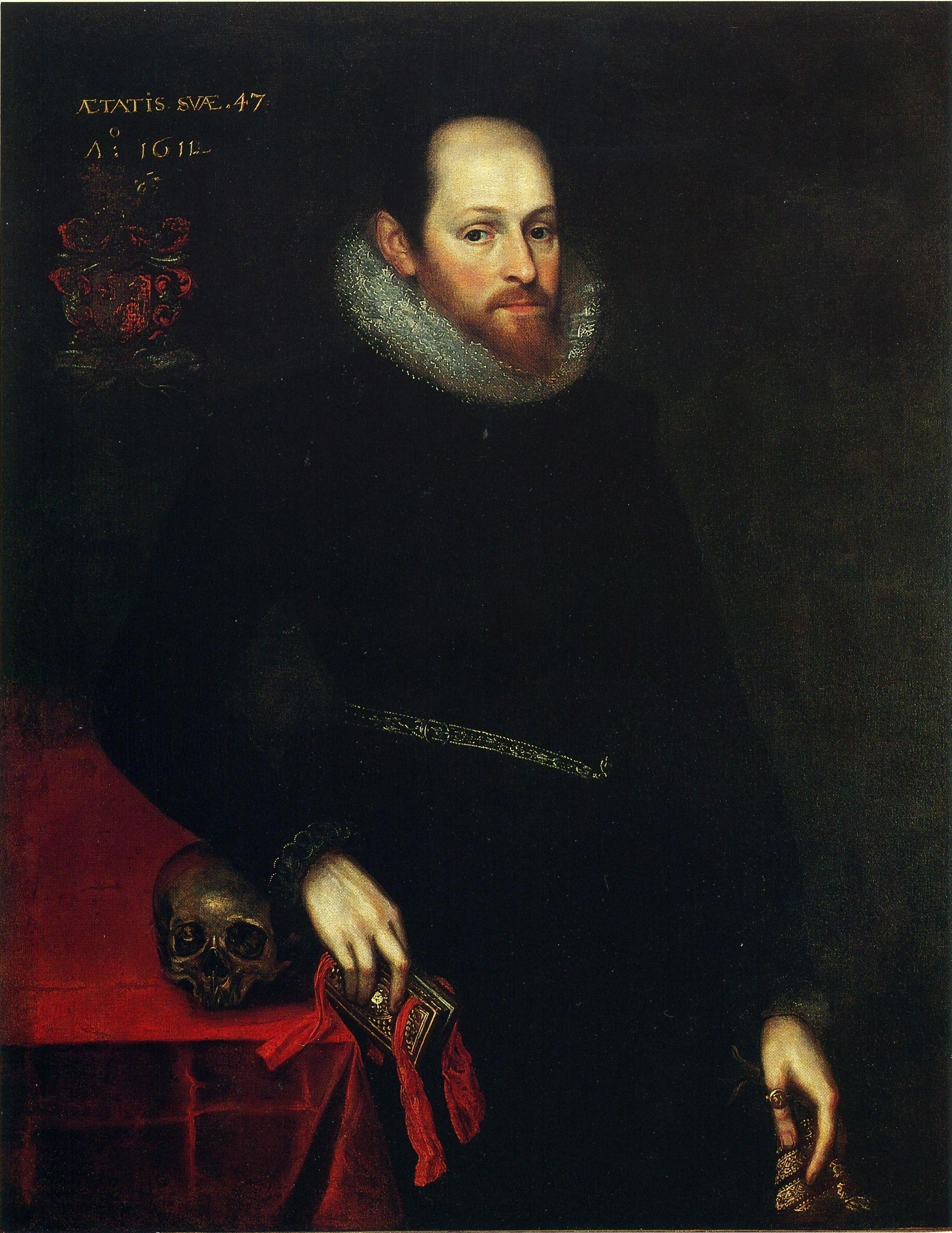
- The Ashbourne portrait as it now appears after restoration.
- Artist: Unknown
- Year: 1612
- Medium: oil on canvas
- Dimensions: 120 cm × 94.6 cm (47 in × 37 1/4 in)
- Location: Folger Shakespeare Library; Washington D.C.

The Ashbourne portrait is one of several portraits that have been falsely identified as portrayals of William Shakespeare. At least 60 such works had been offered for sale to the National Portrait Gallery in the 19th century within the first forty years of its existence; the Ashbourne portrait was one of these. The portrait is now a part of the collection of the Folger Shakespeare Library in Washington, DC.

The identity of the artist is unknown. At some point the portrait was altered to cater to public demand for more pictures of the bard and to conform to 19th century ideas of Shakespeare. The hair over the forehead was scraped out and painted over to create a bald patch. It was also lengthened at the sides, an appearance associated with Shakespeare. The date was also altered to fit Shakespeare's age. The coat of arms was painted over. In this form the painting bore the date 1611 and purported to show Shakespeare at the age of 47.

In 1940, Charles Wisner Barrell argued on the basis of x-ray evidence that the portrait originally depicted Edward de Vere, 17th Earl of Oxford and that this was evidence that Oxford was the true author of Shakespeare's plays. In 1979 the coat of arms was rediscovered following restoration. It was identified as that of Hugh Hamersley (1565–1636), Lord Mayor of London in 1627.

== History ==
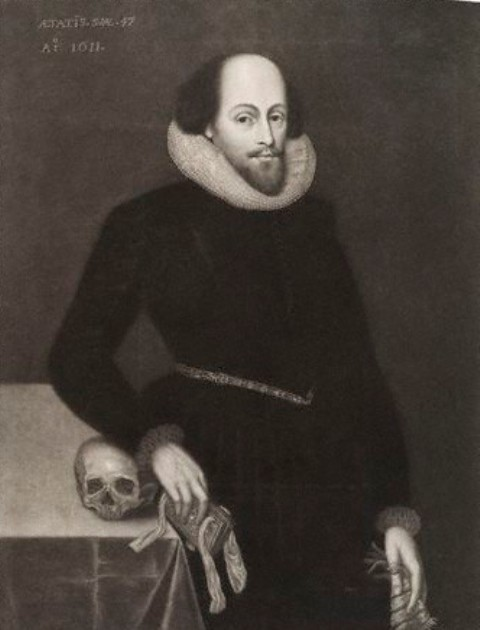
The portrait as it appeared in G.F. Storm's mezzotint.

It was first brought to light by Clement Usill Kingston in 1847. Kingston was a schoolmaster at the Ashbourne School and amateur painter living in the town of Ashbourne, Derbyshire, after which the portrait came to be named. He wrote to Abraham Wivell, an authority on Shakespeare portraits, explaining the circumstances in which he claimed to have found it. According to Kingston, "a friend in London sent me word that he had seen a portrait of Shakespeare, that he was positive it was a genuine picture, and that the owner only valued it as being a very fine painting. Being too poor to purchase it himself, he advised me by all means to have it." He immediately purchased it. Kingston told Wivell that the design on the book held in the subject's hand was a combination of "the crest of the Shakespeare family and the tragic mask". After examining the work, Wivell enthusiastically endorsed it.

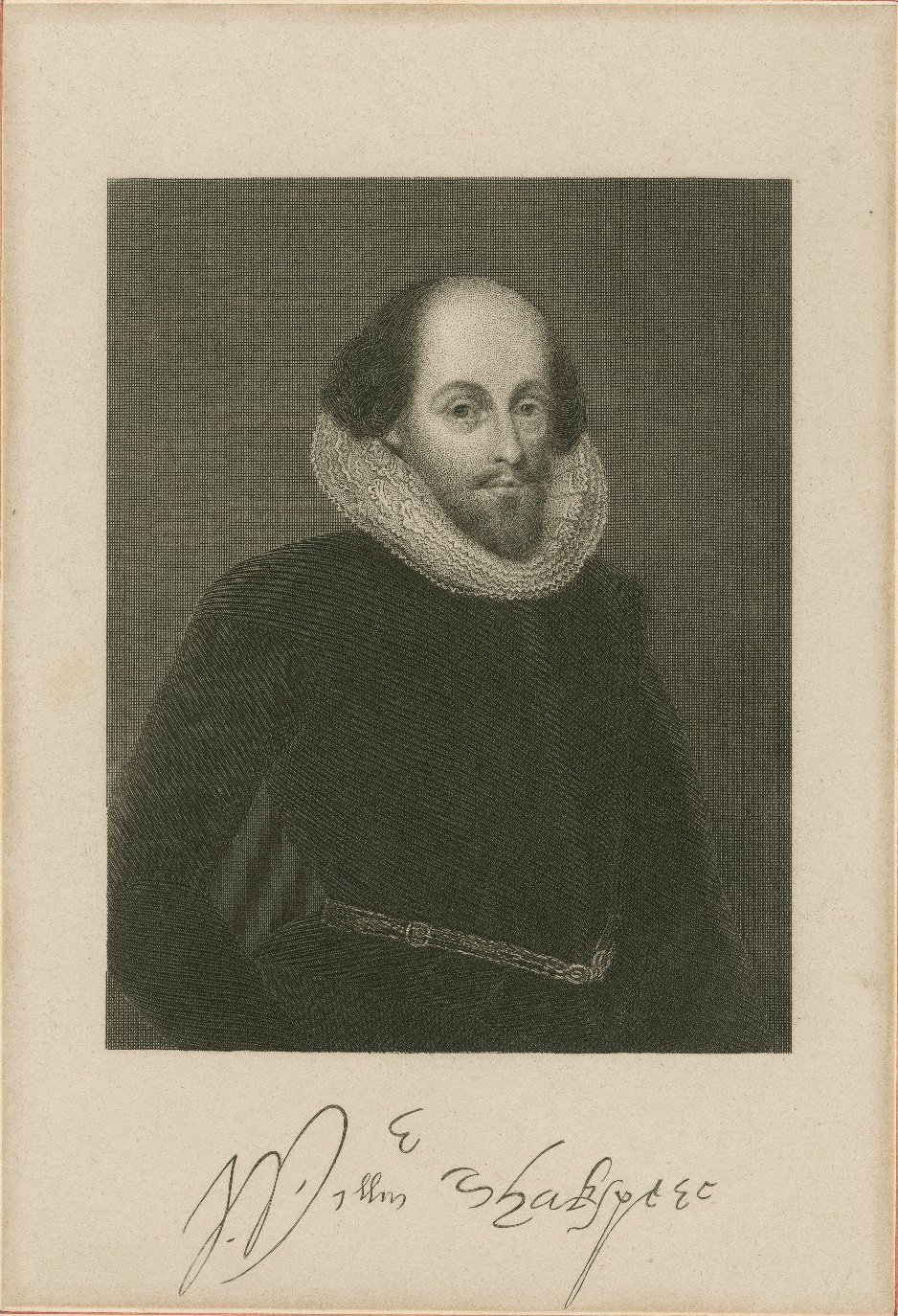
19th-century print based on the Ashbourne portrait, when the sitter was presumed to be William Shakespeare

It was subsequently reproduced in mezzotint by G.F. Storm. In this form it was widely reproduced during the 19th century, having entered the canon of Shakespeare portraits.

In 1910 M.H. Spielmann devoted two articles to a critical analysis of the portrait, with regard to provenance, attribution and identification. He dismissed Kingston's claim that the Shakespeare "family crest" could be seen on the book. He also rejected a suggestion that the subject was portrayed in the character of Hamlet. He concluded that the aristocratic nature of the portrait did not conform to Shakespeare's status as a playwright, and that the painting's historical subject was a mystery. However, he accepted that Shakespeare could be the portrait's subject.

The painting was auctioned at Sotheby's in 1928, and sold for £1,000 ($5,000) to Eustace Conway, an American lawyer, who in turn sold it to Henry Clay Folger's widow, Emily Jordan Folger in 1931, for the sum of $3,500, as a gift to the Folger Shakespeare Library, which opened the following year.

In 1932, the writer Percy Allen argued that the painting originally depicted Edward de Vere, 17th Earl of Oxford, but had been later retouched. In 1940, Charles Wisner Barrell investigated the portrait using X-rays and concurred with Allen's view. Art historian William Pressly, who catalogued the Folger's paintings, and directed the 1988 restoration of the work, states that the controversy surrounding the sitter's identity was resolved in 1979, when restorative work on the painting revealed conclusively (Note: "Michaels, in removing much of the overpaint, exposed the coat of arms, making it possible for the first time to identify the sitter with certainty. … the coat of arms … [was] linked conclusively … to the armorial coat of Hamersley.") that it had been begun as a portrait of Sir Hugh Hamersley. The Folger Library dates the painting to 1612, and while stating that most researchers identify the painting's subject as Sir Hugh Hamersley, notes that some Oxfordians contend it depicts Edward de Vere. It currently hangs in the Folger Shakespeare Library.

== Allen and Barrell's theories ==
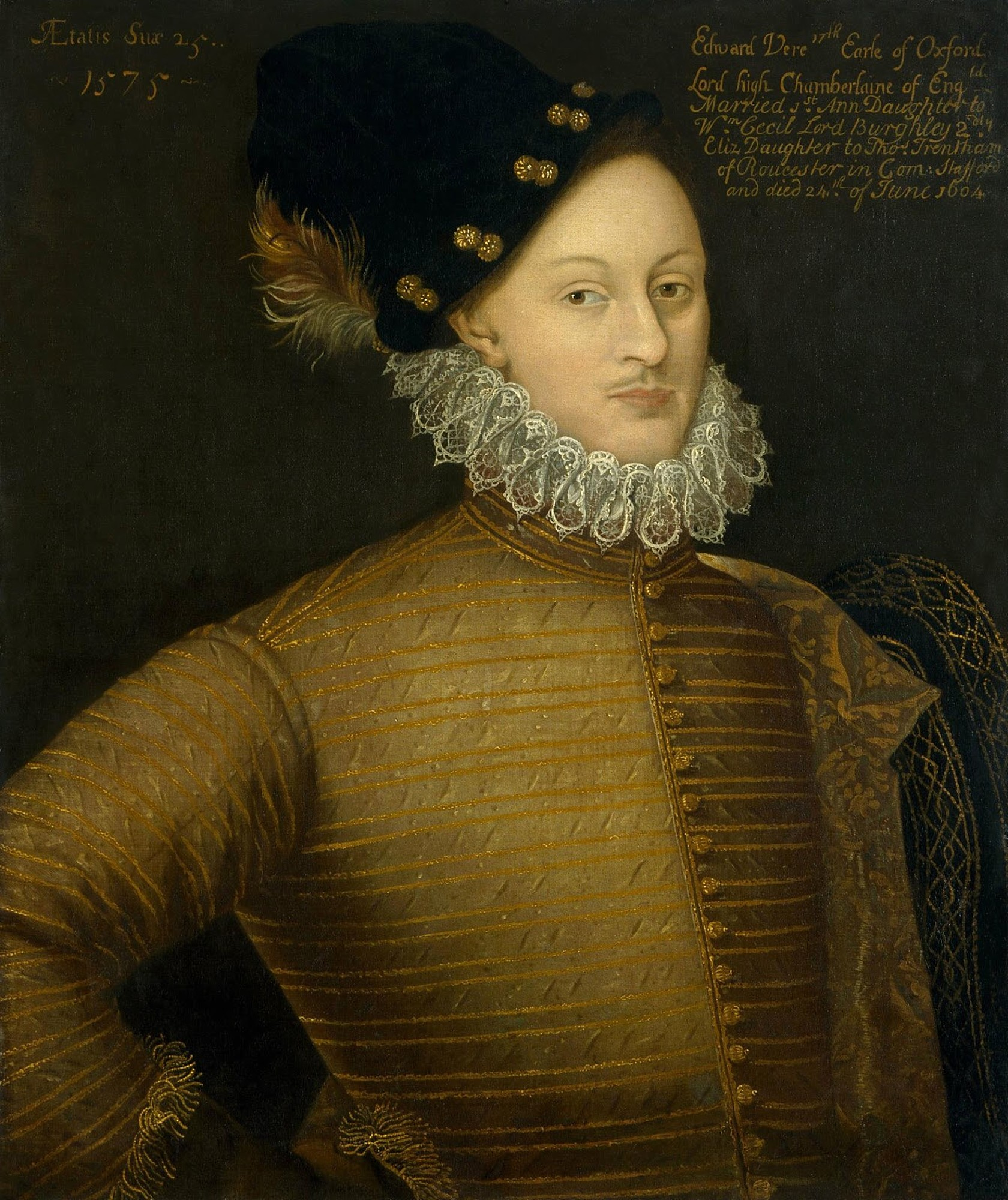
Percy Allen argued that this portrait of Edward de Vere matched the physiognomy of the Ashbourne portrait.

In 1932, Percy Allen published The Life Story of Edward de Vere as "William Shakespeare". Allen was a supporter of J. Thomas Looney's theory that the works of Shakespeare were written by de Vere, the 17th Earl of Oxford. He argued that the features of the man in the Ashbourne portrait corresponded to those of de Vere and that the costume suggested a date earlier than 1611. He believed that the portrait dated from 1597, but had later been retouched as part of "an elaborate plot". (Note: Allen states that the identification was suggested to him by Father Vere Beauclerk.)

In 1940, Charles Wisner Barrell, a former director of Motion Pictures for the Western Electric Company, an American follower of Looney's and Allen's views, examined the portrait using X-ray and infra-red photography, and proved what Allen had suspected, namely that the painting had indeed been tampered with. He supported Allen's conclusion that it was a retouched portrait of Edward de Vere. On the basis of what was taken to be the artist's monogram, C.K., beneath a coat of arms, he concluded that the portrait was the work of Cornelius Ketel, who had been active in England and had reportedly done one of Oxford's portraits. He also suggested that the coat of arms belonged to Oxford's wife, Elizabeth Trentham. Ketel had in fact been commissioned in 1577 to paint a series of 19 portraits for the Cathay Company, in which Oxford had invested and lost a large sum of money.

Barrell's identification received wide exposure, and caused a sensation. Barrell believed he had proven that there was literally a cover-up, a conspiracy to conceal the identity of the Edward de Vere he believed to be the real author of Shakespeare's works.

In late 1948/early 1949 a further series of X rays was made at the National Gallery of Art by Stephen S. Pichetto. These failed to reveal a "C. K." beneath the coat of arms. It is conjectured that if they were there, they probably stood for "Clement Kingston", the original owner who profited from the "discovery" of a new portrait ostensibly depicting Shakespeare. In 1948 Barrell sued Giles E. Dawson, the curator of Books and Manuscripts for the Folger Shakespeare Library in Washington, D.C for suggesting in a letter that Barrell had doctored his x-ray pictures. Though Barrell had promised to supply the Folger library with copies of the photographs he had commissioned, he never did so, and their present whereabouts are unknown. Folger director Joseph Quincy Adams, according to Dawson, also believed Barrell had tampered with his evidence. (Note: Pressly writes: "Barrell never did supply the Folger with a set of the photographs he had commissioned. Later, in a manuscript of 1979, Dawson recalled that the Folger's director, Joseph Quincy Adams, who had given Barrell permission to photograph the paintings, had told him that Barrell had come in a few days later with only a plain photograph: 'When he held this up to a light, a coat-of-arms appeared, but it also appeared that Barrell had drawn the arms on the back of the print. He explained that he didn't want to show the X-ray pictures. What was Adams to think but that the whole thing was a fraud?'") The suit was dismissed in 1950.

== 1979 restoration ==
In 1979, the Folger commissioned Peter Michaels to restore the portrait. In removing the overpaint, he uncovered the coat of arms, and his assistant Lisa Oehrl made a sketch of it, unaware of the sitter's identity. It was Lilly Lievsay, Folger cataloguer of manuscripts, and Folger curator Laetitia Yeandle who, on the basis of this drawing, linked the image of the sketch conclusively to the armorial coat of Hamersley. The restorative work also clarified the date, which had been tampered with to yield the year 1611 (when Shakespeare was 47). Beneath the second 1 of that date a 2 is clearly visible, indicating it was executed in 1612, 8 years after Oxford's death, when Hamersley was 47 years old. Above the date is written aetatis suae.47 (aged 47). He had not, at that time, been granted his coat of arms, and art historian William Pressly conjectures that they were either included in anticipation of the honour, or painted in later.

The original alterations to the Hamersley painting, to make it look like what people would expect of a portrait of Shakespeare, is thought to be the handiwork of Clement Kingston, who was also a painter. Some Oxfordians, though disappointed, quickly accepted the results, and claimed partial credit for the new findings.

The identity of the sitter is, however, still believed to be de Vere by some Oxfordians. Oxfordian Barbara Burris published articles arguing that the Folger had deliberately erased the CK monogram and "that the fashions the sitter wears in the painting date to about 1580, when Hamersley would have been 15 and Oxford 30, and when Ketel [who returned to Holland in 1581] was working in England."

== Sources ==
- Allen, Percy (1932). The Life Story of Edward de Vere as "William Shakespeare". London: C. Palmer. OCLC 715981837.
- Dowden, Hester (1947). "medium". Talks with Elizabethans: Revealing the Mystery of "William Shakespeare". By Allen, Percy. London: Rider. OCLC 20424165.
- Barrell, Charles Wisner (1940). "Identifying Shakespeare: Science in the Shape of Infra-red Photography and the X rays Brings to Light at Last the real Man Beneath the Surface of a Series of Paintings of the Bard". Scientific American. 162 (1). Springer Nature: 4–8, 43–5. doi:10.1038/scientificamerican0140-5. ISSN 0036-8733.
- "The Ashbourne portrait". Folger Shakespeare Library. n.d.
- Hearn, Karen, ed. (1995). Dynasties: Painting in Tudor and Jacobean England 1530–1630. New York: Rizzoli. ISBN 978-0847819409.
- Lee, Sidney (1899). A Life of William Shakespeare. London: Smith, Elder and Co. OCLC 492113741.
- Nelson, Alan H. (2003). Monstrous Adversary: The Life of Edward de Vere, 17th Earl of Oxford. Liverpool English texts and studies. Vol. 40. Liverpool University Press. ISBN 9780853236788.
- Niederkorn, William S. (10 February 2002). "A Historic Whodunit: If Shakespeare Didn't, Who Did?". The New York Times. Archived from the original on 26 April 2016.
- Pressly, William L. (1993). "The Ashbourne Portrait of Shakespeare: Through the Looking Glass". Shakespeare Quarterly. 44 (1). Folger Shakespeare Library: 54–72. doi:10.2307/2871172. eISSN 1538-3555. ISSN 0037-3222. JSTOR 2871172.
- Pressly, William L. (1993). A Catalogue of Paintings in the Folger Shakespeare Library. Yale University Press / Folger Shakespeare Library. ISBN 9780300052145.
- Shapiro, James S. (2010). Contested Will: Who Wrote Shakespeare?. Faber & Faber. ISBN 978-0571235766.
