= Charles Wisner Barrell =

American writer (1885–1974)

- Born: 6 July 1885
- Died: 20 June 1974 (aged 88)
- Occupations: Journalist; Writer; Public relations
- Years active: c.1907–1970s
- Notable work: Identifying Shakespeare

Charles Wisner Barrell (6 July 1885 – 20 June 1974) was an American writer. He first became significant as an art critic, promoting realism. He later built a career as an early exponent of public relations and as a documentary film maker.

In his later life he became a prominent supporter of the Oxfordian theory of Shakespeare authorship, making significant contributions to the theory. His claims for the Ashbourne portrait were particularly influential.

== Career ==
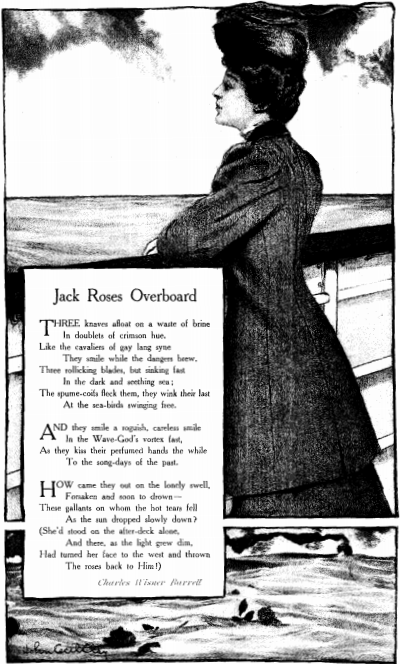
"Jack Roses Overboard", poem by Barrell published in Munsey's Magazine, 1907

Born in Warwick, New York, Barrell was the son of Charles Wisner Barrell senior and his wife Mary.

Barrell established himself as a miscellaneous writer in the early 20th century, publishing verse, essays and criticism. He wrote widely on contemporary art and was a strong supporter of the Ashcan School, whose 1908 exhibition at the Macbeth gallery he defended against conservative critics who, in his words, considered them to be a "revolutionary black school" promoting anarchy in art. He was impressed by the "real drama of the slums" portrayed by Ashcan artist John French Sloan in his etchings.

He later worked in public relations for various businesses. He was a consultant on art and photography for the Western Electric Company and Bell Telephone Laboratories. He also produced and directed documentary films for Western Electric.

He married Mary Sabsovich.

== Advocate of Oxfordian theory ==
He became an ardent advocate of J. Thomas Looney's theory that the works of Shakespeare were written by Edward de Vere, 17th Earl of Oxford. He wrote many essays in support of this view.

In 1934 he came to England looking for archival evidence to link de Vere to the works of Shakespeare. He hoped to identify the illegitimate son of Oxford and Anne Vavasour, who he believed to be the Fair Youth of the sonnets. He successfully identified Edward Vere, the couple's son, publishing his findings in 1941. When the Second World War curtailed his activities in England, Barrell helped to establish an American branch of the Shakespeare Fellowship and publish a newsletter.

=== Theories ===
Barrell claimed to find hidden references to Oxford's secret authorship in the writings of Thomas Edwards, whose poem Narcissus (1595) uses allegorical nicknames in praising several Elizabethan poets, among them "Adon" and an anonymous poet dressed "in purple robes", "whose power floweth far." Barrell argued that the stanzas about Adon and the anonymous aristocrat must be seen together. He stated that Edwards is revealing that Adon, a reference to Shakespeare's Venus and Adonis, is really the Earl of Oxford, forced by the Queen to use a pseudonym. Barrell also originated an argument that the phrase "Swan of Avon" in Ben Jonson's 1623 poem praising Shakespeare could refer to Oxford, as he owned Bilton Hall, a house near the Avon. Irvin Matus later demonstrated that Oxford had sold the house 42 years earlier.

==== Ashbourne portrait ====
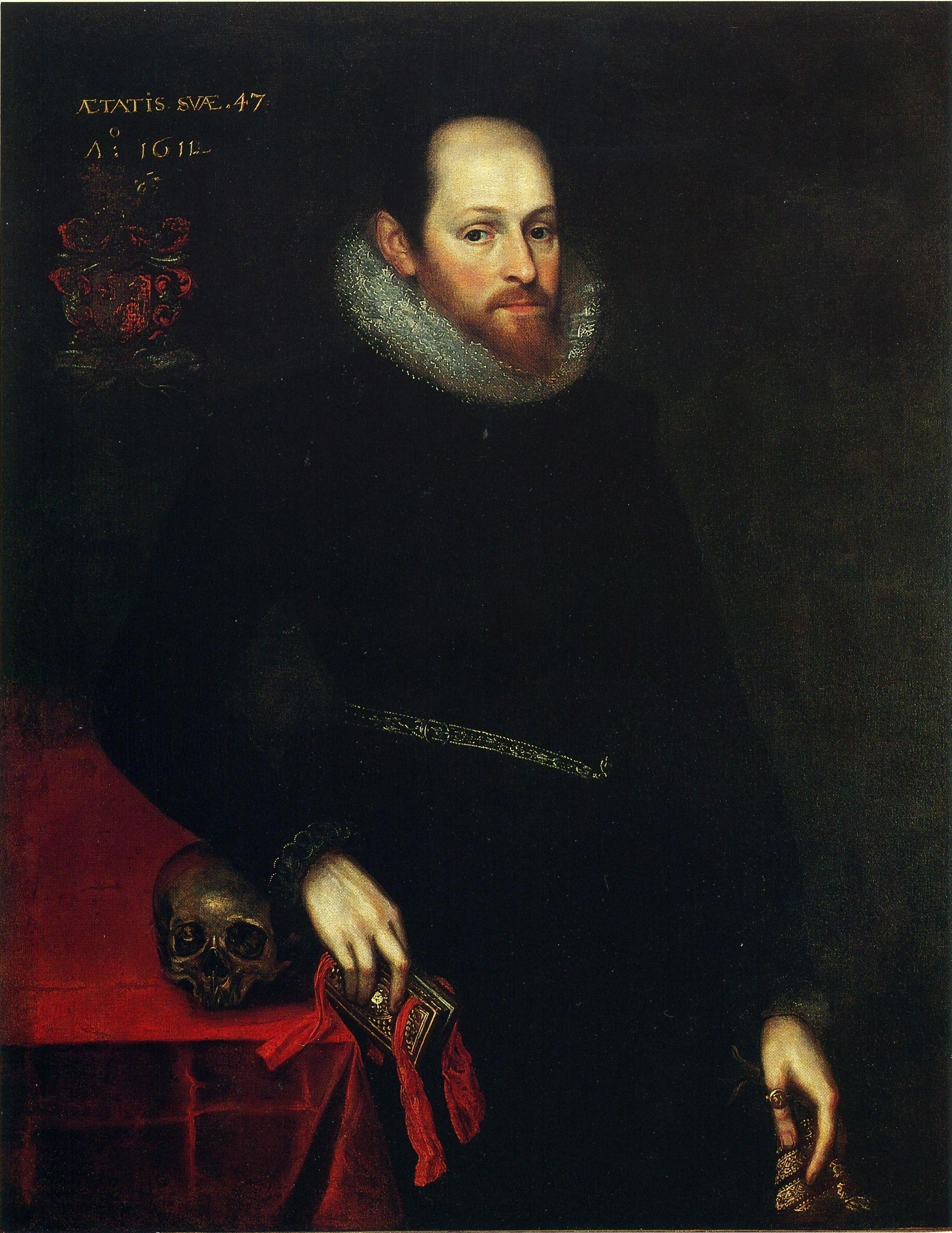
The Ashbourne portrait as it now appears after restoration.

He is best known for his studies of The Ashbourne portrait, which had been believed to depict Shakespeare. He examined the portrait using X-ray and infra-red photography in hopes of finding hidden clues to its origin, publishing his results in Scientific American in 1940. He stated that he had found evidence that it was a portrait of Oxford and that the initials C.K. were visible beneath the surface. He took the view that these were the initials of Cornelius Ketel, an artist known to have painted a portrait of the Earl of Oxford. Later studies contradicted Barrell's evidence, identifying the portrait's sitter as Hugh Hamersley. Barrell also claimed that the Janssen portrait depicted the earl. More recent studies identify it as a portrayal of Thomas Overbury.
