= Norman Cameron =

Norman Cameron is the name of:

- Norman Cameron (poet) (1905–1953), Scottish poet
- Norman Cameron (politician) (1851–1931), Australian politician
