= Mary Anne Stirling =

19th-century English actress

Mary Anne 'Fanny' Stirling
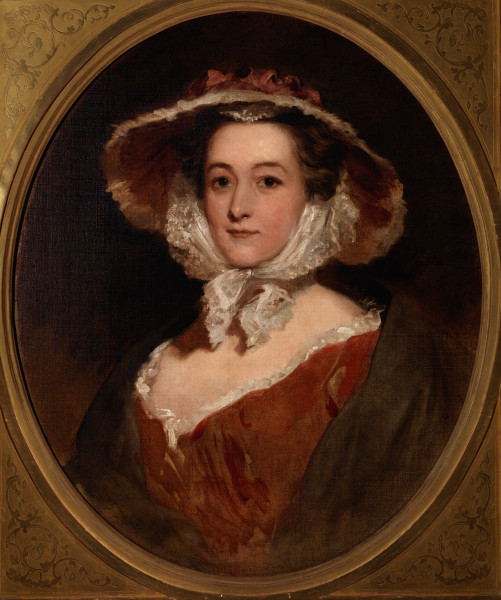
- Portrait of Fanny Stirling in character, by Henry Wyndham Phillips, 1852
- Born: Mary Anne Hehl; 29 July 1815; Mayfair, London, United Kingdom of Great Britain and Ireland
- Died: 28 December 1895 (aged 80); Marylebone, London, United Kingdom
- Burial place: Brompton Cemetery
- Occupation: Actress
- Spouse: Edward Lambert (m. 1832; died 1894) Sir Charles Hutton Gregory (m. 1894)
- Relatives: Percy Allen (grandson)

Mary Anne 'Fanny' Stirling (née Hehl, later Lady Gregory; 1815–1895) was an English actress known for her comedy roles in a career for over fifty years.

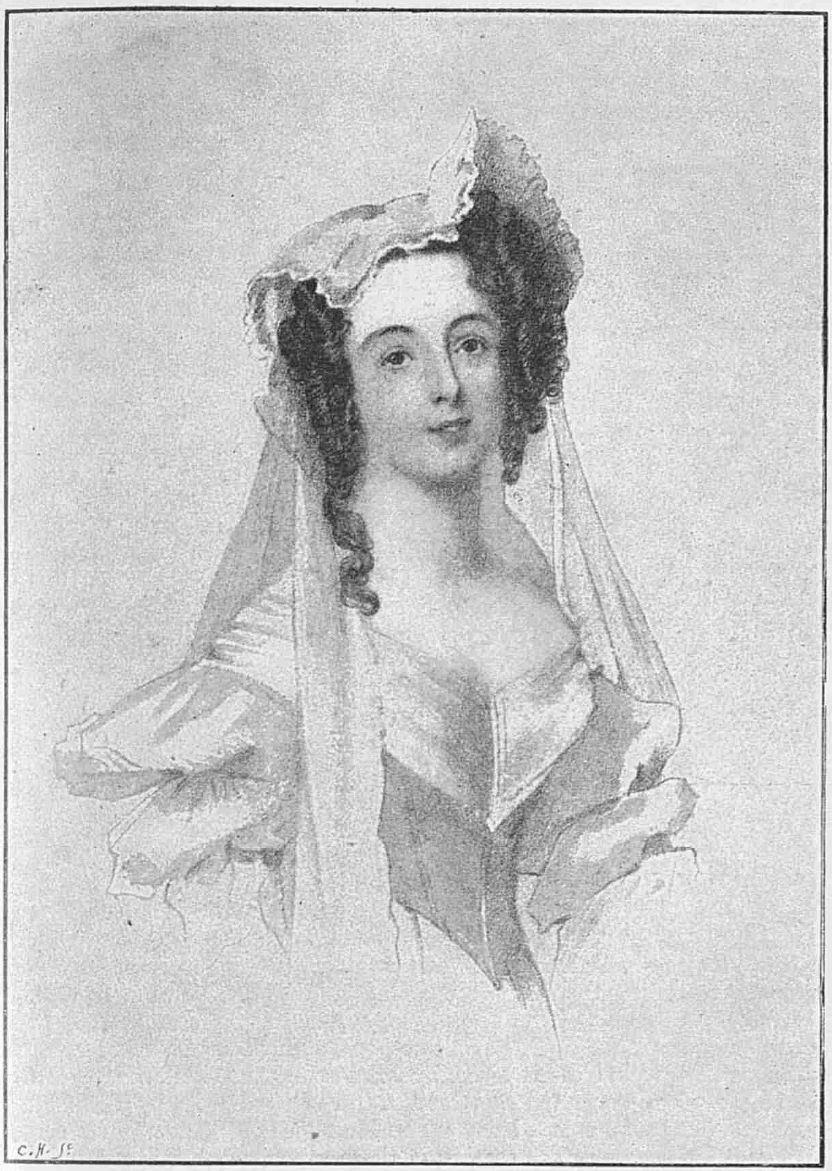
Portrait of Fanny Stirling, made in 1836 by Richard Lane, ARA

== Biography ==
Stirling was born in Mayfair on 29 July 1815, the daughter of a spendthrift father Captain Simon Hehl and his second wife Mary Anne Lucas. As part of her education she was sent to convent school in France. She appeared as Zephyrina, the widow, in The Devil and the Widow at the Pavilion Theatre, Whitechapel in January 1832. Later that year she married the playwright, actor and manager Edward Stirling Lambert (1809–1894). They worked together and they were known as Mr and Mrs Stirling and her husband's first play was Sadak and Kalasrade which was performed in Theatre Royal, Birmingham in 1835. Having been successful as Celia in As You Like It and Sophia in The Road to Ruin, Macready gave her an opportunity to play Cordelia to his Lear, and Madeline Weir to his James V in the Rev. James White's King of the Commons.

In 1852 she created Peg Woffington in Reade and Taylor's Masks and Faces.

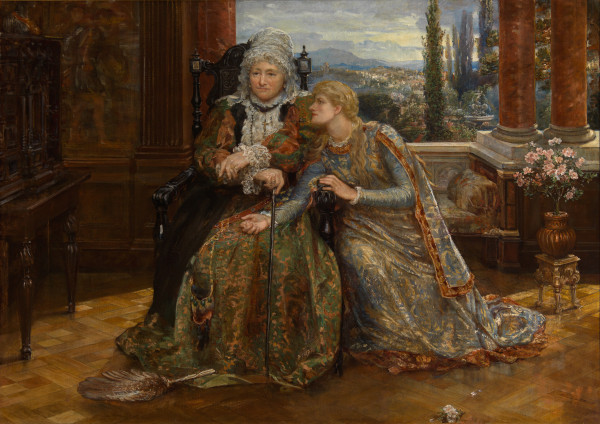
Stirling as the nurse and Ellen Terry as Juliet in Romeo and Juliet is a painting by Anna Lea Merritt

In later years Mrs Stirling gained a new popularity as the nurse in Irving's presentation (1882) of Romeo and Juliet where she was said to "steal the show" from a cast that included Ellen Terry but she returned to the role in 1884 with Mary Anderson; and she was the Martha in Irving's production of Faust (1885). She died on 28 December 1895, having in the previous year married Sir Charles Hutton Gregory (1817–1898).

She is buried in Brompton Cemetery; at her request there were very few mourners, one of whom was the actor-manager Squire Bancroft. London. A biography of her was published in 1922 by her grandson Percy Allen; the appendix lists all the principal parts Mrs Stirling played from 1831–2 to 1885. An obituary in The Era also gives an extensive critique of her many performances.

Her second husband died in London on 10 January 1898, and he was also buried in Brompton Cemetery.
