= Abraham Wivell =

English painter

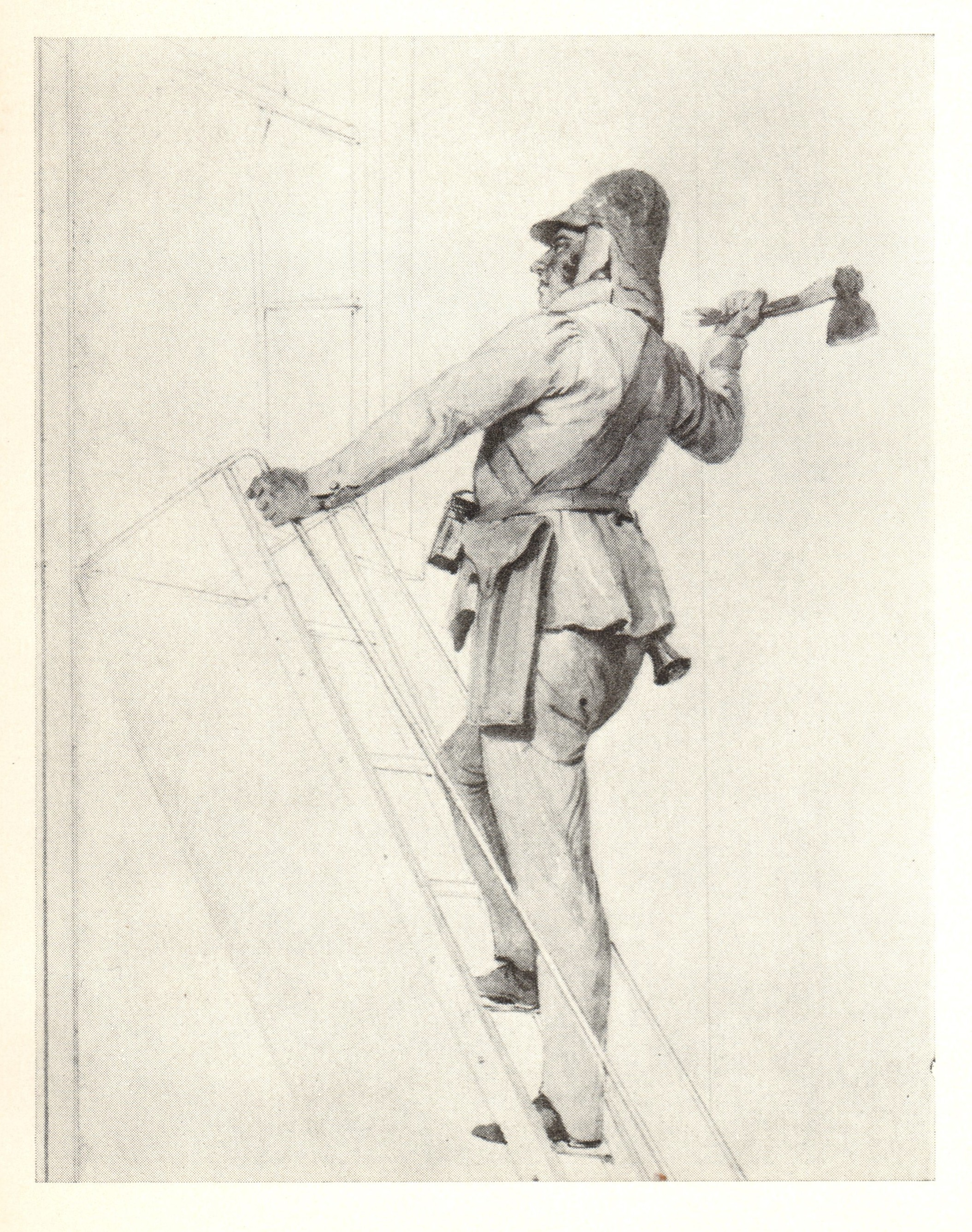
Mr Wivell in the costume of a firefighter on a fly-ladder escape, 1836

Abraham Wivell (1786 – 29 March 1849) was a British portrait painter, writer and pioneer of fire protection, credited with inventing the first effective fire escape system. After working as a hairdresser, Wivell established himself as a society portrait painter before concentrating his efforts on fire safety measures.

== Art ==
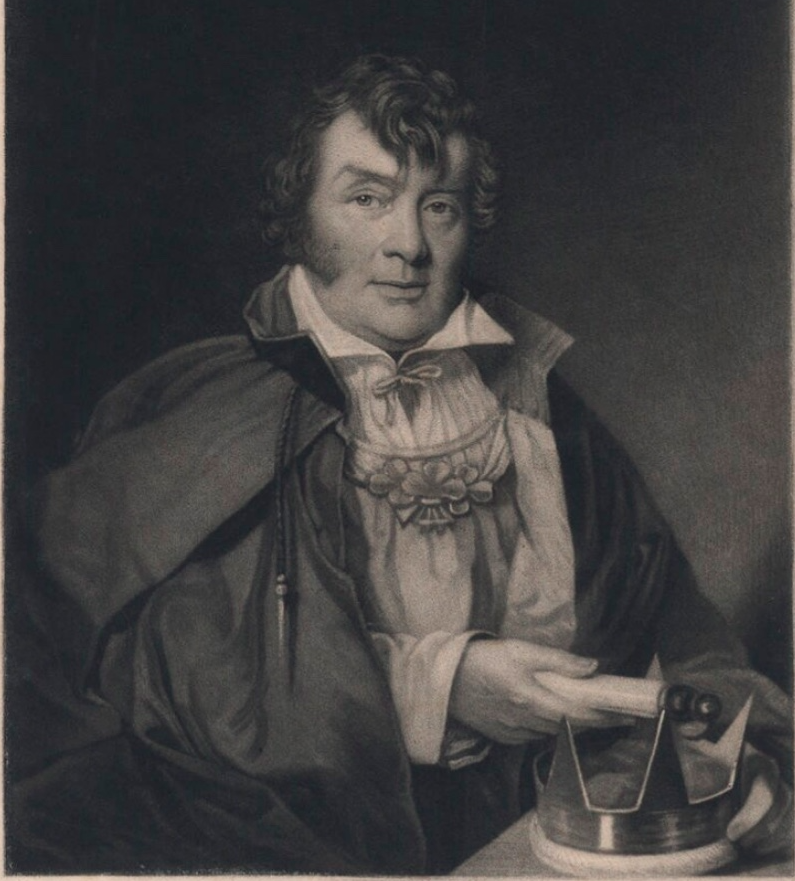
engraving by Wivell depicting Roger O'Connor holding a crown. O'Connor claimed to be the rightful king of Ireland

Born in Marylebone, London, Wivell was forced to work from an early age after his father died leaving his mother in poverty. He worked on a farm from the age of six, and did various jobs in London as a child. In 1799, he was apprenticed to a wigmaker, which at the time was part of normal hairdressing. After completing his seven-year apprenticeship, he set up his own hairdressing salon.

Initially an amateur artist, he advertised his skills by showing portrait miniatures he had painted in his hairdressing shop window. By this means he gained commissions for portrait drawings and paintings, aided by the support of Joseph Nollekens and James Northcote. A drawing he created of Caroline of Brunswick, wife of King George IV, appealed to the queen herself, who gave Wivell a personal sitting. His link to the queen soon helped him achieve fame as an artist. When she was put of trial for adultery in the House of Lords, Wivell sneaked in among the lawyers and made sketches of the leading figures involved. These were published to illustrate the sensational case. The popular feeling in favour of Caroline led to good sales. Wivell later depicted other figures in the news, including Arthur Thistlewood, a leader of the Cato Street conspiracy.

Wivell subsequently became an established society portraitist, painting royalty and aristocracy. He also painted nearly 200 portraits of MPs for a view depicting the House of Commons in session, which was published as a print. Most of Wivell's portraits were highly finished works in pencil, though he did paint some oils and attempted to make some etchings.

After visiting Stratford-upon-Avon to make a study of the tomb sculpture of Shakespeare, Wivell decided to create an illustrated study of all known portraits of the poet. In 1827 Wivell published the work under the title An inquiry into the history, authenticity, & characteristics of the Shakspeare portraits. As well as a collection of prints, the book presented a detailed examination of purported Shakespeare portraits. The book also replied the arguments of an earlier work by James Boaden. Unfortunately, Wivell lost a great deal on money on the venture, as the cost of printing such a richly illustrated work far exceeded the sales. However, he was saved financially by the death of his uncle, Abram Wivell of Camden Town, who left him his house and furniture and a lifetime annuity of £100.

== Fire protection ==
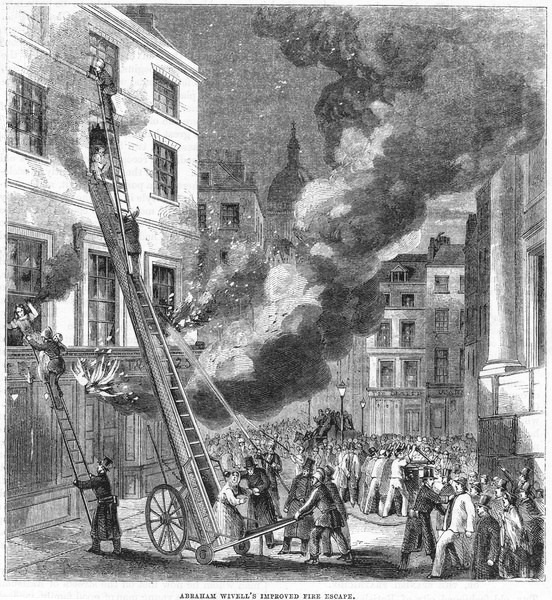
"Abraham Wivell's improved fire escape". An illustration in The Leisure Hour depicting Wivell's fire escape in action

In the 1820s Wivell turned his attention to fire protection, arguing, along with others, that the private fire brigades of the time were more concerned with protecting property than human life. Several voluntary groups sprung up dedicated to solving this problem. In 1836 the "Royal Society for the Protection of Life from Fire" was created with Wivell in charge of developing techniques for helping people escape from burning buildings. Wivell designed a portable fire escape, which could be brought to buildings and erected rapidly.

He created demonstration models of the design to illustrate a series of lectures on fire-fighting that he gave in 1836. The ladder was mounted on a wheeled chariot. Once at the scene, a fly ladder was swung into position with ropes. A rescued person could be quickly passed down through a canvas chute that hung below the ladder, allowing a rapid flow of escapees. 85 fire escape stations were established in London by the society containing escape ladders on the Wivell design. Other cities also acquired Wivell's design.

== Later life ==
He resigned his position with the society in 1841 after a dispute, and moved to Birmingham, where he resumed his artistic career. In 1847 he endorsed the authenticity of the newly discovered Ashbourne portrait, which was claimed to depict Shakespeare. In 1849 he died of Bronchitis in Birmingham.

Wivell was married twice and had fourteen children. He was survived by ten of his children. His oldest son, also called Abraham Wivell, was also a successful painter.
