= Olinthus Gregory =

English mathematician, author, and editor

Dr Olinthus Gilbert Gregory LLD, FRAS
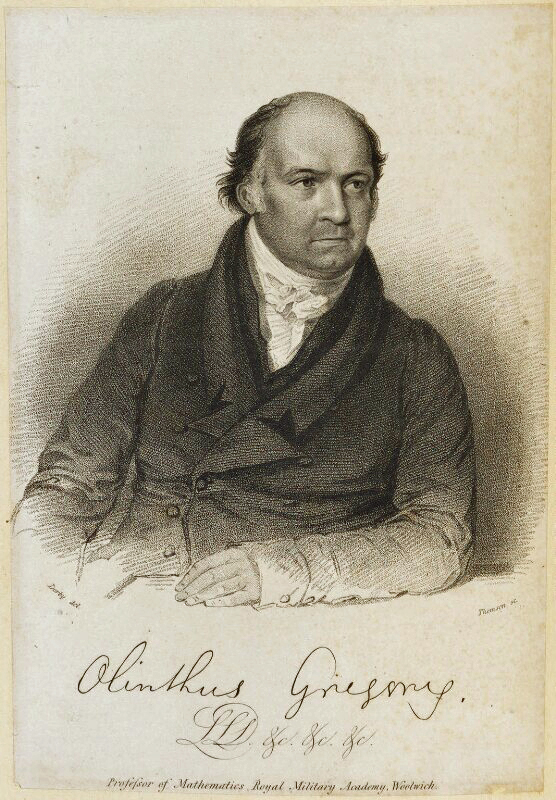
- Olinthus Gilbert Gregory by Thomson, after William Derby © National Portrait Gallery
- Born: 29 January 1774; Yaxley, Huntingdonshire
- Died: 2 February 1841 (aged 67); Queen’s Terrace, Woolwich
- Occupation: Professor of Mathematics
- Spouses: Rebecca Marshall (m. 1798; died 1807) Anne Beddome (m. 1809)

Olinthus Gilbert Gregory (29 January 1774 – 2 February 1841) was an English mathematician, author, and editor.

== Biography ==
Gregory was born on 29 January 1774 at Yaxley in Huntingdonshire, the son of Robert, a shoemaker, and Ann, who also had three younger daughters: Harriet Euphrasia, Sophia (who died in 1783) and Marianna.

Having been educated by Richard Weston, a Leicester botanist, Olinthus published a treatise, Lessons, Astronomical and Philosophical in 1796. After moving to Cambridge in 1796, Gregory first acted as sub-editor on the Cambridge Intelligencer, and then opened a booksellers shop.

In 1802 he obtained an appointment as mathematical master at the Royal Military Academy, Woolwich through the influence of Charles Hutton, to whose notice he had been brought by a manuscript on the Use of the Sliding Rule; and when Hutton resigned in 1807 Gregory succeeded him in the professorship.

Gregory combined his love of mathematics with an interest in music, but not in the melodious sense: music should be subject to rational principles. He proposed "the substitution of proper characters to denote the different kinds of musical time, instead of those vague indefinite ones, which are now in use." No more 3/2 time, or Adagio and Allegro; rather, some absolute rate, based on the swing of a precisely-calibrated pendulum. Each composition should be played at its pre-defined speed, no matter who was conducting. In discussing Gregory's ideas, Werrett draws attention to the environment at Woolwich in which he developed them, and the use of the metronome to maintain a consistent rhythm in military music.

Gregory favoured the establishment of a secular university in London. By the end of 1825 he was on a ten-man committee interviewing and selecting the teaching staff. His name was inscribed on the foundation stone of the new university, laid in Gower Street on 30 April 1827.

Failing health obliged him to retire in 1838, and he died at his home at Queen's Terrace, Woolwich on 2 February 1841. Gregory's library was sold on 17 & 18 March 1842 by Southgate & Son of 22 Fleet Street.

The esteem in which Dr Gregory was held can be judged from the following letter in 1841:

To the Editor of the Morning Chronicle.
Sir - I see by your paper of the 11th inst., that Doctor Olinthus Gregory, late Professor Mathematics, &c. &c.,
Royal Military Academy, Woolwich, has left his widow and family in any thing but affluent circumstances.
Now, I do trust, that out of the number of people who have experienced his exertions, as a Professor at
the Royal Military Academy, and also have benefitted by him as highly scientific individual, there may be
found some who will subscribe to the benefit of the widow and family of that excellent man.
I remain, sir,
C. D., M.P.,
One of Dr. O. G.'s pupils at the R.M.Ac., Woolwich
Edinburgh, Feb. 13.

=== Affiliations ===
Many in this list are cited in the University of St Andrews website.

- Corresponding Associate of the Academy of Dijon
- Honorary Member of the Literary and Philosophical Society of New York
- Member of the New-York Historical Society
- Member of the Literary and Philosophical, and the Antiquarian Societies of Newcastle upon Tyne
- Member of the Cambridge Philosophical Society
- Member of the Institution of Civil Engineers
- Founder member, and later Secretary, of the Astronomical Society
- Professor Mathematics in the Royal Military Academy, Woolwich
- Co-founder and first president of the Woolwich Institution for the Advancement of Literary, Scientific and Technical Knowledge

In 1802 Gregory was appointed editor of the Gentlemen's Diary, and from 1819 to 1840 editor of the Lady's Diary. From 1817, "he had the whole of the general superintendence of the almanacks published by the Stationers’ Company."

=== Family ===
On the 4 March 1798, Gregory married Rebecca Gregory (née Marshall; 1769–1807) in Yaxley, Huntingdonshire. The couple had a son, James Gregory, and a daughter, Eliza Gregory.

On 20 December 1809, Gregory married Anne Gregory (née Beddome; 1789–1855) at St Mary Church in Stoke Newington. The couple had a daughter and two sons, Boswell Robert Gregory and the civil engineer Charles Hutton Gregory. In 1834, Boswell Gregory drowned in the Thames at Woolwich aged 21. A poem by Letitia Elizabeth Landon commemorating Boswell appears in the 1835 edition of Fisher's Drawing Room Scrap Book^{α}.

== Works ==
- Gregory, Olinthus (1799). Lessons, astronomical and philosophical : for the amusement and instruction of British youth (2nd ed.). London: T. Conder, Bucklersbury.
- Gregory, Olinthus (1802). A treatise on astronomy. London: G. Kearsley.
- Gregory, Olinthus (1807). An Elementary Treatise on Natural Philosophy; translated from the French of M R-J Hauy, with notes, in 2 vols. London: George Kearsley.
- Hutton, Charles; Gregory, Olinthus (1811). A course of mathematics in three volumes. Composed for the use of the Royal military academy (6th ed.). London: F. C. and J. Rivington.
- Gregory, Olinthus (1812). Letters to a friend, on the evidences, doctrines and duties of the Christian religion (2nd ed.). London: Robert Baldwin and John Hatchard.
- Good, John Mason; Gregory, Olinthus; Bosworth, Newton (1813). Pantologia. A new cyclopaedia, comprehending a complete series of essays, treatises, and systems, alphabetically arranged etc. In 12 volumes. London: Kearsley.
- Gregory, Olinthus (1815). Dissertations and letters etc. [on the trigonometrical survey of England and Wales]. London: Sherwood, Neely, and Jones.
- Gregory, Olinthus (1816). Elements of plane and spherical trigonometry etc. London: Baldwin, Cradock, and Joy.
- Gregory, Olinthus (1817). A dissertation on weights and measures: and the best means of revising them. London: Baldwin, Cradock, and Joy.
- Gregory, Olinthus (1825). Mathematics for Practical Men (3rd ed.). London: Baldwin, Cradock & Joy.
- Gregory, LLD, Olinthus (1827). "An Account of some Experiments made in order to determine the Velocity with which Sound is transmitted in the Atmosphere". Transactions of the Cambridge Philosophical Society. 2. Cambridge: Cambridge University Press: 119–137.
- Gregory, LLD, Olinthus (1828). Memoirs of the Life, Writings, and Character, Literary, Professional, and Religious, of the Late John Mason Good. London: Henry Fisher, Son, and Co.
- Hutton, Charles; Gregory, Olinthus; Adrain, Robert (c. 1831). A Treatise of Mechanics, Theoretical, Practical, and Descriptive (5th American, from the 9th London ed.). New York: W E Dean.
- Under the Superintendence of Gregory, Olinthus (1831–32). The entire works of Robert Hall. With a brief memoir of his life, and a critical estimate of his character and writings. London: Holdsworth and Ball.
- Gregory, LLD, FRAS, Olinthus (1840). Hints, theoretical, elucidatory and practical, for the use of teachers of elementary mathematics etc. London: Whittaker & Co.
- Gregory, Olinthus (1840). White's Coelestial Atlas; or, an improved Ephemeris for the Year of our Lord 1840, Being Bissextile, or Leap Year. London: James, Luke G. and Luke J. Hansard.

== Notes ==
^α Olinthus Gregory, L.L.D., F.R.A.S., &c..
