= Percy Allen (writer) =

English journalist, writer and lecturer

- Born: Percy Stirling Allen; 13 October 1872 Croydon, Surrey, United Kingdom of Great Britain and Ireland
- Died: 1959 (aged 86–87)
- Occupation: Writer; journalist; specialist in Elizabethan theatre
- Years active: 1900–1959
- Relatives: Edward Stirling (maternal grandfather); Fanny Stirling (maternal grandmother)

Percy Allen (1872–1959) was a British writer, journalist and specialist in Elizabethan theatre, known for the Prince Tudor theory and the Oxfordian theory of Shakespeare authorship.

== Early life ==
Allen was born on 13 October 1872 in Croydon to James Allen, a solicitor, and Frances Mary 'Fanny' Stirling (1842-1929), an actress. Allen's maternal grandparents were Mary Anne 'Fanny' Stirling (née Hehl, later Lady Gregory), an actress, and Edward Stirling, a playwright.

Allen's twin brother, Ernst Stirling Allen (1872–1939), was a solicitor and fellow advocate of the Oxfordian theory of Shakespeare authorship.

== Early writings ==
Living in Croydon, by the early 20th century Allen was established as a prolific author and journalist.. In his youth he became a member of the Christian adventist sect the Plymouth Brethren..He moved to France, publishing several travel books about France. Impressions of Provence (1910) and Burgundy: the Splendid Duchy – Stories and Sketches in South Burgundy (1912) were collaborations with the illustrator Marjorie Nash. Berry: The Heart of France (1923) was a similar work illustrated by P. Dubuisson. He also wrote on French poetry and history, publishing Songs of Old France (1908) and Roman and Mediaeval France published by the Paris-Lyon Mediterranean Railway. He was in France during the First World War, working with the YMCA in 1918.

After the war he returned to London, and was employed by the Christian Science Monitor as its drama critic. In 1922 he wrote a biography of his grandmother, The Stage Life of Mrs Stirling: With Some Sketches of the Nineteenth Century Theatre. In the mid-1920s he also published a number of plays. These included two full-length comedies, Tradition and the Torch and Comers Down the Wind, along with two one-act plays, The Seekers and The Life that's Free. At the same time Allen became interested in Spiritualism, after having read several books on the subject. He was convinced of the veracity of spirit-communication by Arthur Conan Doyle.

In 1928 he turned his attention to Shakespeare, publishing Shakespeare and Chapman as Topical Dramatists, an attempt to demonstrate that works by Shakespeare and George Chapman commented on political and cultural events of the day. He later followed it up with a book on Shakespeare's and Chapman's references to events in recent French history. In 1929, he published Shakespeare, Jonson and Wilkins as Borrowers, drawing attention to the wide range of sources appropriated by Elizabethan dramatists.

== Oxfordian works ==
Shortly after beginning to work on Shakespeare, he became converted to the theories of J. Thomas Looney, founder of Oxfordian theory, which claims that Edward de Vere, 17th Earl of Oxford wrote the plays published under Shakespeare's name. He soon became a strong advocate of the theory. In 1930 he wrote The Case for Edward de Vere, 17th Earl of Oxford as Shakespeare. He followed it up with a regular stream of publications, most importantly The Life Story of Edward de Vere as "William Shakespeare", in which he attempted to create a biography of de Vere matched to the publication of the poems and plays. Allen argued that the Ashbourne portrait depicted de Vere in the guise of Shakespeare, asserting that the features of the man in the portrait corresponded to those of de Vere and that the costume implied a date earlier than 1611, the one signed to the image. He believed that the portrait dated from 1597, but had later been retouched as part of "an elaborate plot". Allen also believed that the Grafton portrait depicted de Vere.

Allen argued that George Chapman was a bitter enemy of Oxford and that many of his writings were attacks on Oxford/Shakespeare. He is the "Rival Poet" mentioned in the sonnets. According to Allen, his play The Revenge of Bussy D'Ambois is in fact a sustained criticism of Hamlet. Oxford wrote Troilus and Cressida in response, an attack on Chapman's translations of Homer, in which Chapman is caricatured as Thersites.

=== Prince Tudor theory ===
Soon, however, Allen's views began to diverge from Looney's. Looney wrote that Allen and another follower, Bernard Mordaunt Ward, were "advancing certain views respecting Oxford and Queen Eliz. which appear to me extravagant & improbable, in no way strengthen Oxford's Shakespeare claims, and are likely to bring the whole cause into ridicule." This was the suggestion that the queen had a son by Oxford, which first appears in an appendix to The Life Story of Edward De Vere. The child is not identified. Allen argues that a passage in Two Gentlemen of Verona is a reference to the queen's pregnancy, which could easily be concealed in those days by the "fashion of dress of great ladies". A later book claimed that the child was an actor named William Hughes, and then finally Allen argued that it was Henry Wriothesley, 3rd Earl of Southampton, the dedicatee of Shakespeare's poems.

Allen's theory was not well received by many Oxfordians. Among those who rejected it was Sigmund Freud, a strong supporter of Looney. Freud wrote personally to Allen to express his disapproval.

=== Talks with Elizabethans ===
In 1936 Allen undertook a three months' lecture tour of Canada and the USA. In the following year he lost the use of his right eye after an operation, while also having to cope with serious financial problems. In 1939 his twin brother Ernest, to whom he was very close, died. This, and the outbreak of World War II, pushed Allen into depression. He consulted the medium Hester Dowden seeking to contact his brother and find support for his beliefs. Dowden had previously provided support to the Baconian theory, a rival alternative theory of Shakespeare authorship. Dowden's "spirit guide" spoke to the spirit of Ernest who contacted de Vere, Shakespeare and Bacon. De Vere stated that he collaborated with other writers to create the plays and confirmed that the Ashbourne portrait depicted him. Dowden's biographer reveals that Allen's was the final and true revelation on the topic, since from his teenage years Allen had been destined to be the bearer of the ultimate truth:

When Percy Allen was a boy of fifteen or sixteen he had to pass one of the University Extension examinations which necessitated his reading The Tempest. It was his first introduction to Shakespeare, and the thrill which he received from it set his mind upon a lifetime study of the plays. Unknown to Allen at this time, a plan had been worked out by spirit people interested in his earthly life that he should be the means of finally unravelling the great mystery of Shakespeare's origin and work."

These revelations were published in Talks with Elizabethans in 1945. The controversy caused by the events forced Allen to stand down as president of the Oxfordian organisation the Shakespeare Fellowship, to which he had been elected in 1944. When his predecessor Montagu Douglas left, the president's post remained empty for a year.

After this Allen continued to write and lecture. He was described as a pleasant and entertaining speaker by the Oxfordian journal Shakespearean Authorship Review, which stated that "he held his audience tightly in his mesh of literary fascination". He died in 1959 at the age of 84.
