= Charles Hutton Gregory =

English civil engineer (1817–1898)

Sir Charles Hutton Gregory KCMG
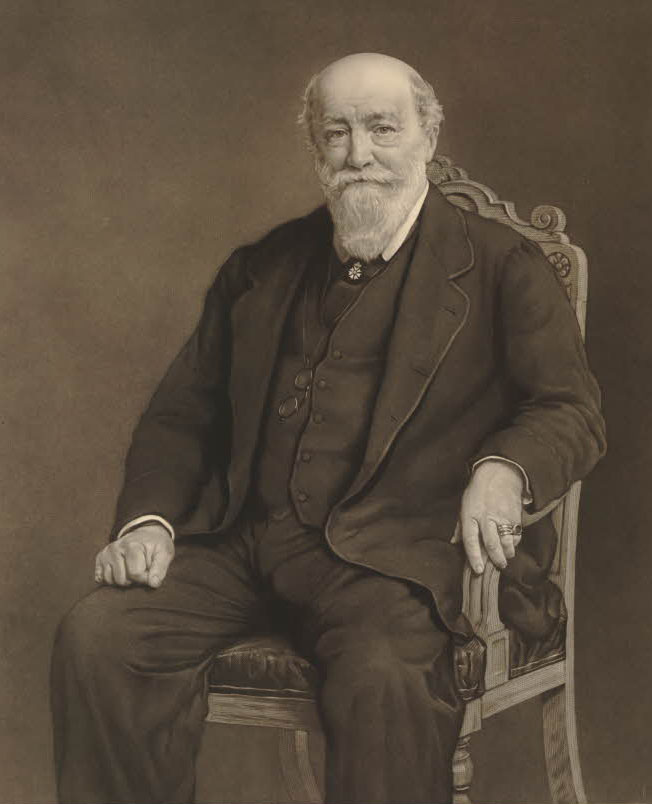
- Portrait of Sir Charles Hutton Gregory, John Collier, c. 1866–c. 1898
- Born: 14 October 1817; Woolwich, London, United Kingdom of Great Britain and Ireland
- Died: 10 January 1898 (aged 80); London, United Kingdom of Great Britain and Ireland
- Resting place: Brompton Cemetery
- Spouse: Mary Anne 'Fanny' Stirling (m. 1894–1895)
- Parent: Dr Olinthus Gilbert Gregory
- Engineering career
- Discipline: civil engineer
- Institutions: Institution of Civil Engineers (president)
- Significant advance: railway semaphore signalling
- Awards: Knight Commander of the Order of St Michael and St George

Signature
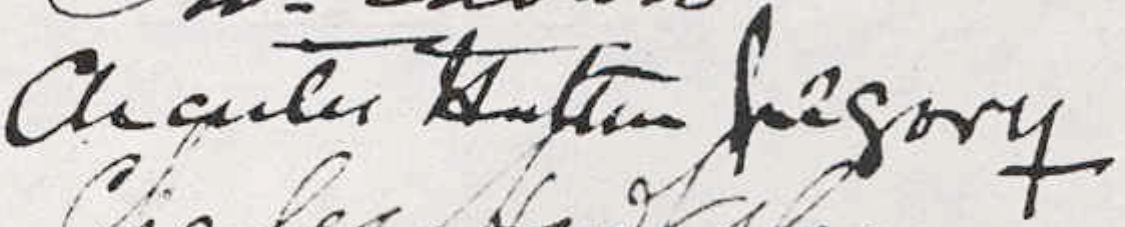

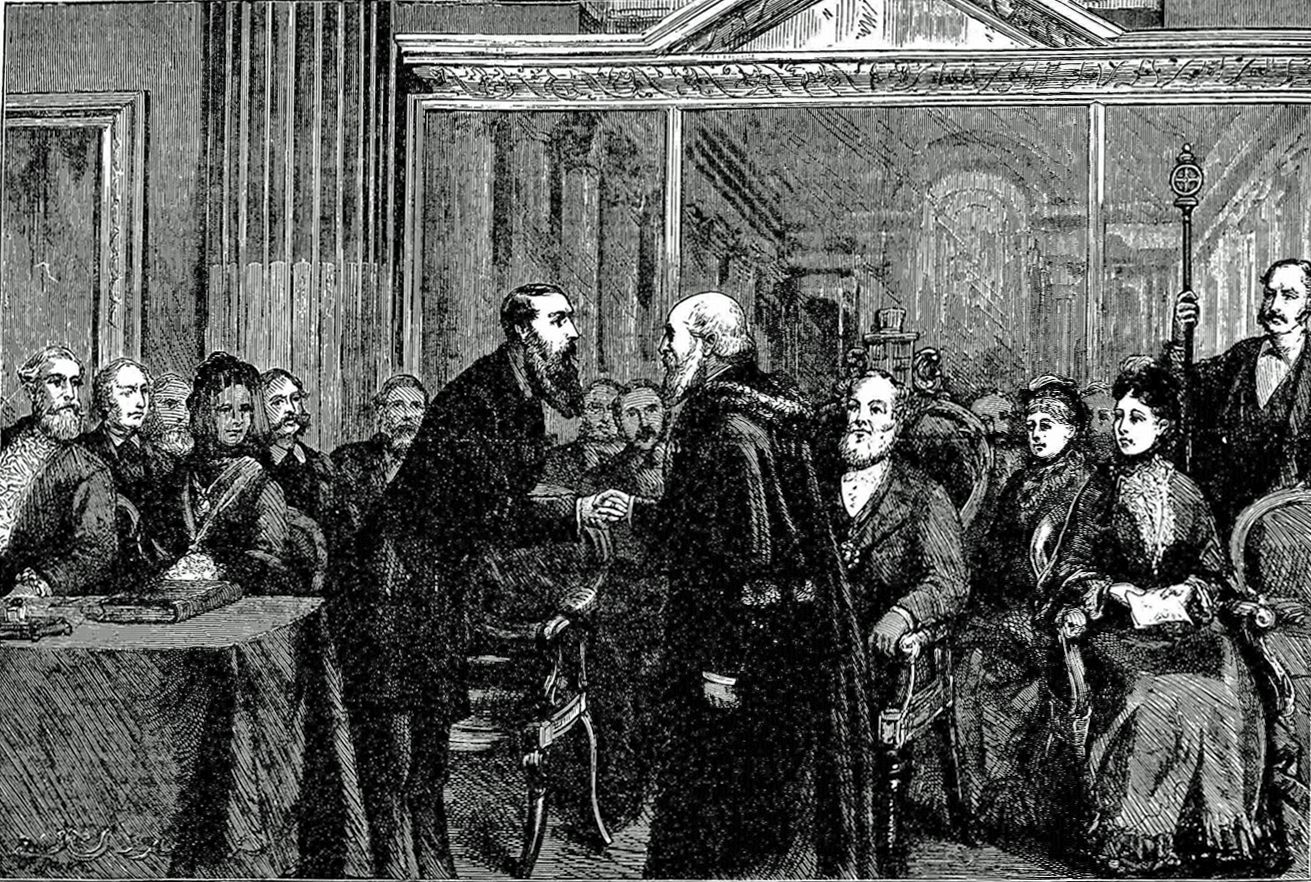
King Leopold II (left of two in centre) receiving the Freedom of the Turners' Company from Gregory in March 1879

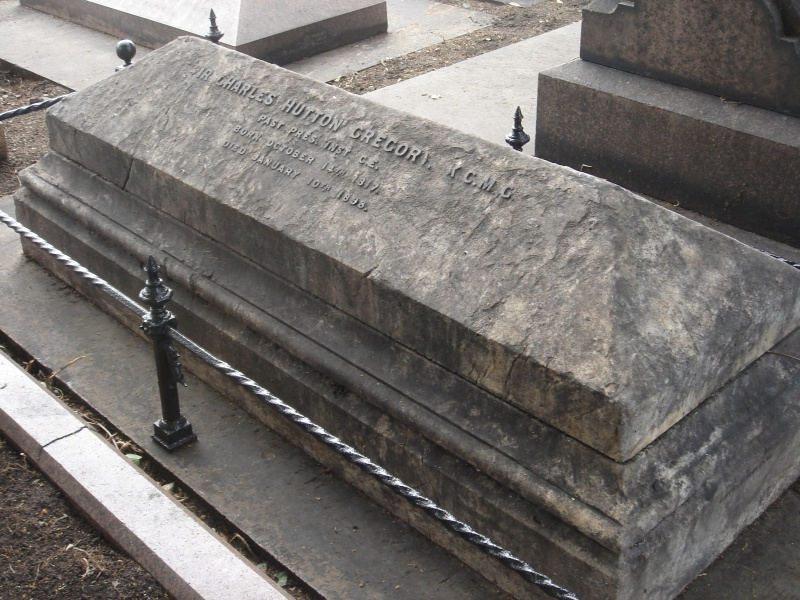
Funerary monument, Brompton Cemetery, London

Sir Charles Hutton Gregory KCMG (14 October 1817 – 10 January 1898) was an English civil engineer. He was president of the Institution of Civil Engineers between December 1867 and December 1869.

Charles was the son of Dr Olinthus Gilbert Gregory, a master of mathematics at the Royal Military Academy, Woolwich. The chair of mathematics at that time was held by Charles Hutton, who acted as Dr. Gregory's patron. It was in Hutton's honour that Charles was named.

Gregory was consulting engineer of several major railway construction works, including those in Ceylon, Trinidad, Cape Colony, Perak and Selangor. He was the first to use railway semaphore signalling which he employed first at New Cross on the London and Croydon Railway in 1841, and the South Eastern Railways in 1842-3. This method later superseded all others and was dominant from 1870. In 1882 he was a member of the Channel Tunnel Committee and in 1886 was a Royal Commissioner for the Colonial and Indian Exhibition.

With these uses in mind, he was interested in the properties of the less usual timbers. In 1886 he, in the company of other leading figures such as Sir Philip Cunliffe-Owen, Sir John Coode and Sir Frederick Bramwell, attended an exhibition at the Chelsea works of A. Ransome and Co, manufacturers of woodworking equipment. There they saw experiments on more than 40 different varieties of colonial timber, including karri wood and jarrah from Western Australia, and padouk from India.

Gregory was instrumental in furthering the careers of many fellow engineers, e.g.

- Frederick George Slessor (1831-1905) -- in 1874, appointed to the staff of Cape Government Railways, first as Chief Officer of Surveys and Resident Engineer, and then Chief Resident Engineer of the Eastern system.
- Frank Alexander Brown Geneste (1842-1888) – in 1877, appointed as an Assistant (later District) Engineer on Cape Government Railways, in the construction of the Beaufort West Extension.
- Henry David Alexander Reid (1856-1899) – in 1878, to take charge of the construction of a section of the Kandy and Matalit Railway in Ceylon.
- William Hugh Woodcock (1844-1908) -- In 1892, appointed to report to the Cape Government on the condition of the bridges on the railways throughout the Colony; the best method complete the Cape Town Harbour Works.

Gregory was a Freemason for much of his working life, and was a member of at least six Lodges. On 7 December 1869 he was given Freedom of the City of London by the Worshipful Company of Turners. He was Master Turner of the Company in 1879, when King Leopold II of the Belgians was presented with honorary membership for "his skill and keenness as an amateur turner". Gregory was appointed a Companion of the Order of St Michael and St George (CMG) in 1876, and appointed KCMG in May 1884.

In 1894, Sir Charles married Fanny Stirling, an actress who died the following year. Gregory died in London on 10 January 1898, and was buried beside his wife. “The grave is on the west side of the main avenue of Brompton Cemetery, not very far from the Richmond Road entrance”.

In his will, Sir Charles bequeathed £1,000 to "Thomas Olinthus Donaldson, of Lee". This was the son of Thomas Leverton Donaldson, architect and co-founder of the Royal Institute of British Architects. Thomas Olinthus was presumably a godson of Sir Charles's father, Olinthus Gregory.

== Publications ==
- (1841). "Practical Rules for the Management of a Locomotive Engine: In the Station, on the Road, and in cases of Accident". London: John Weale.
- (1844). "On Railway Cuttings and Embankments; with an account of some Slips in the London Clay, on the line of the London". Minutes of the Proceedings of the Institution of Civil Engineers. 3: 135–145.
- (1857). "Report of Mr. Charles Hutton Gregory, C.E: dated the 15th of August, 1857, upon the works of the Grand Trunk Railway Company of Canada". London: Waterlow.
- (1868). "Address of C. H. Gregory Esq. on his election as President of the Institution of Civil Engineers, session 1867-68". London: William Clowes & Sons
- (1869). "Remarks on Notification of the Government of India. (by Charles Hutton Gregory, Nov 9 1869)". Minutes of the Proceedings of the Institution of Civil Engineers. 29: 1–3.

Professional and academic associations
Preceded by John Fowler	President of the Institution of Civil Engineers; December 1867 – December 1869	Succeeded by Charles Blacker Vignoles
