= Warren Hope =

American poet and university professor

Warren T. Hope (July 2, 1944 – May 23, 2022) was an American poet and university professor.

== Biography ==
Hope was born in Philadelphia, Pennsylvania, and educated in the public schools there. After graduating from Philadelphia's Central High School, Hope served in the United States Air Force and then attended the Community College of Philadelphia. Hope eventually received a BA, MA, and Ph.D. in English from Temple University. He has worked as a printer, a warehouseman, and an editor, eventually working at the Insurance Institute of America and the American Institute for Property and Liability Underwriters in Malvern, Pa., in publishing and public relations.

Hope is the author of several books, including Adam's Thoughts in Winter (2001), which includes a selection of poems from the years 1970 to 2000, and Moving In (2004), wherein Hope details his life experiences in poetic form. He is also the biographer of Norman Cameron, the British poet, and the author of critical studies of Robert Frost, Seamus Heaney, Philip Larkin, and George Orwell, all published by Greenwich Exchange of London, England. He is the author, with Kim Holston, of The Shakespeare Controversy, published by McFarland & Company in 1992, and has published articles and reviews in several periodicals.

== Bibliography ==
- Adam's Thoughts in Winter (2001) ISBN 1-871551-40-4
- "First Light & Other Poems" (2013) ISBN 978-1-906075-80-4
- "George Orwell"(2007)ISBN 9781871551426
- "A Movement of Minds: Nine American Poets of the Late Nineteenth Century"(2019) ISBN 978-1-910996-20-1
- Moving In (2004) ISBN 0-9741143-3-2
- "Norman Cameron: His Life, Work, and Letters" (2000) ISBN 1-871551-05-6
- "Philip Larkin"(1997) ISBN 1-871551-35-8
- "Robert Frost" (2004) ISBN 1-871551-70-6
- "Seamus Heaney"(2002) ISBN 1-871551-37-4
