= A. J. A. Symons =

English writer and bibliographer (1900–1941)

Alphonse James Albert Symons (pronounced SIMM-ons; (16 August 1900 – 26 August 1941) was an English writer and bibliographer.

== Early life and education ==
Symons was the eldest of four sons and a daughter born to auctioneer Morris (or Maurice) Albert Symons (died 1929), of Russian-Polish Jewish immigrant parentage, and Minnie Louise (died 1964), née Bull. Due to the family's financial difficulties, his education was limited, and he was mainly self-educated. He was obliged to enter a trade at the age of fourteen, and for three years led a "life of drudgery" apprenticed to a furrier. Symons retained a sense of "intense humiliation" over his time in the fur trade, comparing it to "Dickens's time at Warren's blacking factory".

== Career ==
In 1922, he founded the First Edition Club to publish limited editions and to organize exhibitions of rare books and manuscripts. In 1924 he published a bibliography of first editions of the works of Yeats, and in 1930 he founded the Book Collector's Quarterly. He was an authority on writers and editions of the 1890s, and he published An Anthology of 'Nineties Verse in 1928.

Symons completed his first biography, Emin, Governor of Equatoria, in 1928. In 1933 he brought out a biography of the explorer H. M. Stanley. Neither created much of a stir. In 1934, however, Symons published his masterpiece, The Quest for Corvo, a biography of the English author and eccentric Frederick Rolfe (the self-styled Baron Corvo). Subtitled "An experiment in biography," The Quest for Corvo was a groundbreaking work: rather than being a simple narrative of a life, it describes an author's search for understanding of his subject, revealing aspects of Rolfe's life and character as they are revealed to the author. Though it appears entirely natural, the work is very skilfully orchestrated. The result is a vivid, prismatic portrait of Rolfe, those who knew him, and of Symons himself.

Symons wrote with difficulty and sought help in the study of psychoanalysis. He left several unfinished works, including a long-contemplated biography of Oscar Wilde, at his death. His author brother Julian Symons (1912–1994) published his biography in 1950.

== Personal life ==
A dandy and an epicure, Symons devoted much of his energy to fine living. In 1933, he founded the Wine and Food Society with André Simon. In 1924, he married Gladys Weeks; in 1936, the marriage ended in divorce. In 1939 he fell ill, suffering from partial paralysis. He died in 1941 of a tumour of the brainstem.

== Bibliography ==
- Simon C. W. Hewett, A. J. A. Symons: A Bibliomane, His Books, and His Clubs, Grolier Club, 2023.
- P. H. Muir, 'Bibliomanes I: A. J. A. Symons: Part 1', in The Book Collector, Autumn 1954 (Part 2 appeared in The Book Collector in Winter 1954, and Part 3 appeared in The Book Collector in Summer 1955).
- Robert Scoble, The Corvo Cult: The History of an Obsession, Strange Attractor Press, 2014, pages 225–329.
- Julian Symons, A. J. A. Symons: His Life and Speculations, Eyre & Spottiswoode, 1950.
- Julian Symons ed.; A. J. A. Symons, Essays and Biographies, Cassell, 1969.
