= Norman Cameron (poet) =

Scottish poet

Norman Cameron (1905–1953) was a Scottish poet, distantly related to Thomas Babington, Lord Macaulay. Between the two world wars, Cameron associated on Mallorca with Robert Graves and Laura Riding. Later, as a part-time Fitzrovian, he worked closely with Dylan Thomas, Geoffrey Grigson, Ruthven Todd, Len Lye, John Aldridge RA, Alan Hodge and many others. He worked as a copywriter at J. Walter Thompson (being responsible for one classic campaign, Horlicks for night starvation) and at Ogilvy, Benson & Mather.

== Life ==
Born in Bombay, Cameron was the eldest of four children of a Presbyterian minister (chaplain of the Bombay Presidency) who died prematurely in 1913. Subsequently, he and his siblings returned with their mother to live in Edinburgh. For his education he went to Alton Burn Preparatory School in Nairn and Fettes College in Edinburgh, where, at only 11 years old, he was the youngest boy ever to be admitted to the main school. There he came under the influence of, and retained a friendship with, W.C. Sellar (who would later write 1066 and all that).

He went on to Oriel College, Oxford, and his verse was published in Oxford Poetry from 1925 to 1928. Needing money during the Great Depression, he taught briefly in Nigeria, under the auspices of that Colonial Government's Education Department. Then he spent time working and travelling in Continental Europe. While in Germany, during the early part of Hitler's dictatorship, he saw an incident which shocked him all his life: starving inmates of a concentration camp being tormented by local inhabitants, who were throwing bread so that it landed only just beyond the captives' reach. As a result of this, he was utterly dismissive of all later German assertions that most people remained ignorant of what was happening within the worst of the camps.

During the war he worked in London at Broadcasting House for the Political Intelligence Department, using his fluency in French and German; in the North African Campaign, from Alexandria, he continued in the same shadowy organisation, where with Bruno Adler, he wrote radio scripts for a comedy series called 'Kurt and Willy', picked up by Rommel's Afrika Korps. At some time, he was parachuted into Yugoslavia as a translator in dealings with Tito, probably with the 1943 mission led by Fitzroy Maclean. For his work in the war he was awarded an MBE.

At the war's end he worked in the British Zone of Austria (then under four power military occupation) in the British Delegation of the Allied Commission for Austria, in Vienna, based at Schönbrunn Palace. His duties there involved restarting the local newspapers. It was during this period that he met the woman who became his third wife: Austrian journalist Dr Gretl Bajardi.

A fire broke out in the couple's flat in Queens Gate, South Kensington, in 1951; and though all his own writings were saved from the flames, his life's collection of considerable works of reference in art and literature was completely destroyed. He told his younger brother Angus (then working in the British Army Staff in Vienna) that he was distraught, that the loss 'was like losing his own soul and one which he thought, perhaps, spelt the end of his writing'.

Cameron, regarded by Dylan Thomas as his best friend, died in London of a brain haemorrhage only six months before Thomas's own demise.

== Work ==
His poetic output amounted to about 70 poems, he translated works by François Villon, Balzac (Cousin Pons), Voltaire (Candide), Benjamin Constant (Adolphe) and Rimbaud and he also translated and contributed to Hitler's Table Talk 1941-1944, with others including Hugh Trevor-Roper.

Mostly self-taught as a writer, he was nevertheless subtly influenced by his friend Robert Graves; and for a while he became a poetic disciple of Laura Riding, but ceased close dealings with her when he was convinced that she was exercising undue influence on his own style. This breach caused considerable consternation to Laura and some loss to his own wealth – but not to his own dignity.

== Bibliography ==
- The Winter House (1935)
- Work in Hand (1942) with Robert Graves and Alan Hodge, Hogarth Press
- Forgive Me, Sire (1950)
- Collected Poems 1905–1953 (1957) Hogarth Press
- Norman Cameron: Collected Poems and Selected Translations (1990) edited by Warren Hope and Jonathan Barker (published by Anvil Press Poetry) ISBN 978-0-85646-202-3
