= Edward Stirling (playwright) =

English playwright

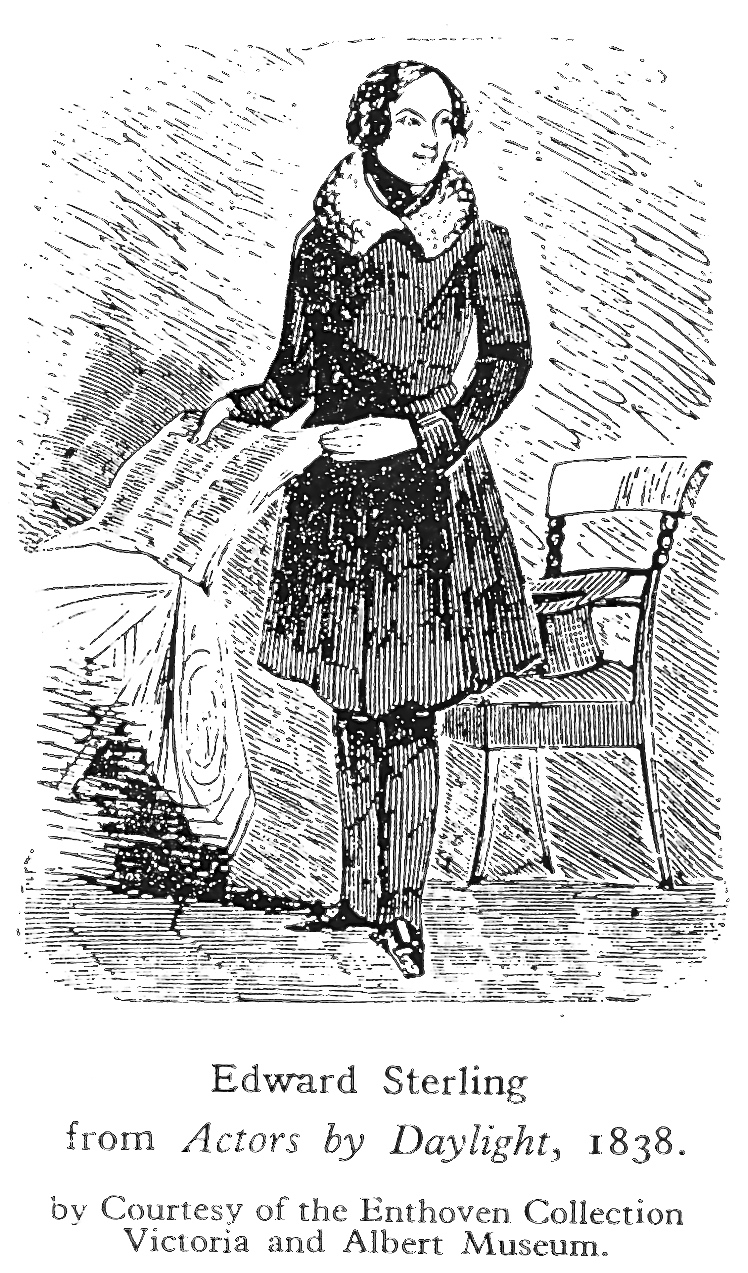
Edward Stirling in 1838

Edward Stirling (April 1809 – c. September 1894) was an English stage manager, actor and dramatist. He published around 200 works for the stage, many being adaptations of works by popular authors, notably Charles Dickens, Walter Scott and Harrison Ainsworth, often within days of the novel's publication. (Note: He was able to produce his "pirated" plays so promptly due to the way Dickens and others published novels: by instalment in the newspapers. Dickens reacted against these clumsy adaptations by appointing Tom Taylor as his "official" dramatist.) He married Mary Anne Stirling (1815–1895), an actress who went on to a long and illustrious career as Mrs Stirling.

== History ==
Stirling was born Edward Stirling Lambert in Thame, Oxfordshire, and started working life as a banker's clerk. Around age 20 he began his stage career first as an actor in the provinces, then as actor/stage manager at the Adelphi, London for Frederick Henry Yates, later took on production at other theatres, finally at Drury Lane.

== Writing ==
His first successful work for the stage was Sadak and Kalasrade, a spectacular drama.

Apart from his original plays he "adapted" the latest novels of Dickens and other authors for the stage. His adaptation of The Cricket on the Hearth played at the Adelphi for over 90 performances. Among his numerous titles were:

- The Thirst for Gold, or the Sea of Ice T. W. Robertson produced another version.
- The Ragpicker of Paris and the Dressmaker of St Antoine
- Aline, the Rose of Killarney (1843) adaptation of Gaetano Rossi's Linda di Chamounix. C. Z. Barnett adapted the same libretto for his Linda, the Pearl of Savoy.
- The Bohemians; or, After Dark in Paris
- Margaret Catchpole became the film The Romantic Story of Margaret Catchpole

Other titles include

- Above and Below
- The Anchor of Hope; or the Seaman's Star
- Bachelors Buttons
- Barnaby Rudge (Dickens)
- The Battle of Life (Dickens)
- The Bluejackets; or, Her Majesty's Service
- The Bohemians; or, The Rogues of Paris
- The Bould Soger Boy
- The Cabin Boy
- Captain Charlotte
- The Children in the Wood; or, Harlequin Nobody
- A Christmas Carol; or, Past, Present, and Future (Dickens)
- Clarisse; or, The Merchant's Daughter
- The Cricket on the Hearth; or, A Fairy Tale of Home (Dickens) T. W. Robertson produced another version.
- The Fortunes of Smike; or, A Sequel to Nicholas Nickleby (Dickens)
- The Giant of Palestine
- Grace Darling; or, The Wreck at Sea
- The Hand of Cards
- Harlequin Blue Beard; or, The Fairy of the Silver Crescent
- Industry and Indolence; or, The Orphan's Legacy
- Jane Lomax; or, A Mother's Curse
- The Jockey Club
- Knight of the Dragon and the Queen of Beauty
- Lestelle
- The Little Back Parlour
- The Love Gift; or, The Trials of Poverty
- A Lucky Hit
- The Miser's Daughter (Harrison Ainsworth)
- Nicholas Nickleby; or, Doings at Do-the-Boys Hall (Dickens)
- Norah Creina
- The Old Curiosity Shop; or, One Hour from Humphrey's Clock (Dickens)
- Oliver Twist; or, The Parish Boy's Progress (Dickens)
- On the Tiles
- Popping In and Out
- Rifle Volunteers; or, Riflemen! Riflemen! Riflemen! Form!
- The Rose of Corbeil; or the Forest of Senart
- The Serpent of the Nile; or, The Battle of Actium
- The Tower of London; or, Og, Gog, and Magog (Harrison Ainsworth)
- Ulrica; or, The Prisoner of State
- Wanted a Wife; or, London, Liverpool and Bristol
- The Wreck at Sea; or, The Fern Light
- Yankee Notes for English Circulation (Dickens)

In 1881 he published a memoir: Old Drury Lane – Fifty Years' Recollections in 2 volumes, which at least one critic enjoyed but another found worthless as a history.

== Marriage ==
Stirling married the actress Miss Fanny Clifton (1815-1895) in 1832 Born Mary Ann Hehl, she was a daughter of Captain Hehl, a military secretary at the War Office.

Her career blossomed when she took Helen Faucit's part in the role of Clara in Lytton’s play Money. Their daughter, Miss Fanny Stirling, made her appearance on the stage about 1860, and gained some reputation as an actress. (Elsewhere her name is given as Pamela Stirling.) Mrs. Stirling retired from the stage in 1886, her last appearance being at The Lyceum as Martha in Faust in 1890.

In 1894, six weeks after Stirling's death, she married Lieut-Colonel Sir Charles Hutton Gregory, a well-known civil and military engineer. She was 79 years of age and he was 78. The wedding was covered sympathetically by all the newspapers, whereas Stirling's death received no mention at the time, and later only in reference to this marriage, and in the most unflattering terms.
