= Hadrian the Seventh =

1904 novel by Frederick Rolfe

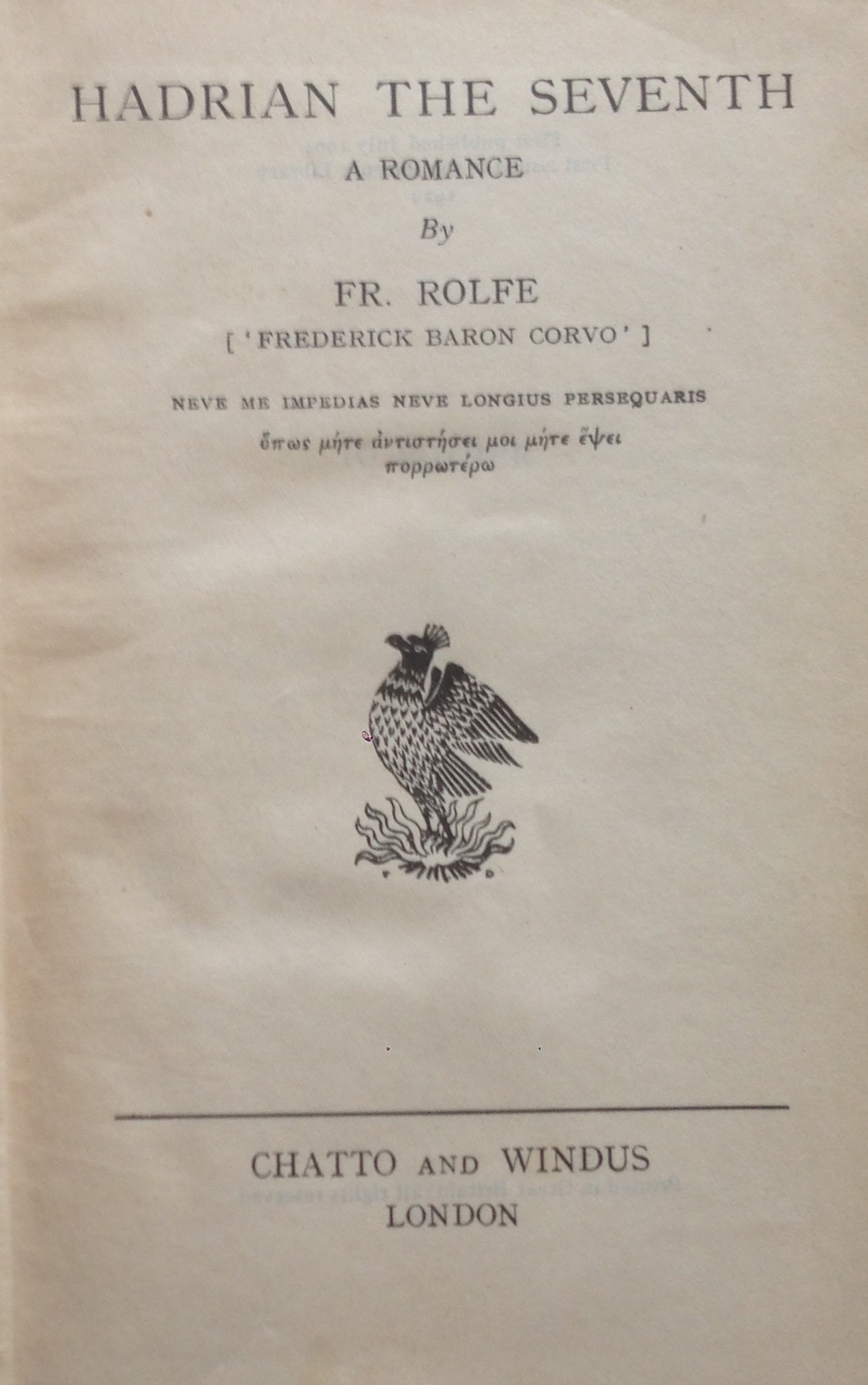
- Title page of first edition
- Author: Frederick Rolfe (Baron Corvo)
- Language: English
- Subject: Papacy, Catholic Church
- Publisher: Chatto & Windus
- Publication date: 1904
- Publication place: United Kingdom
- Pages: 413
- OCLC: 1216758
- Dewey Decimal: 823.912
- LC Class: PR5236 .R27
- Preceded by: Stories Toto Told Me
- Followed by: Nicholas Crabbe

Hadrian the Seventh: A Romance (sometimes called Hadrian VII) is a 1904 novel by the English novelist Frederick Rolfe, who wrote under the pseudonym "Baron Corvo".

Rolfe's best-known work, this novel of wish-fulfilment developed out of an article he wrote on the Papal Conclave to elect the successor to Pope Leo XIII.

== Plot ==
The prologue introduces us to George Arthur Rose (a transparent double for Rolfe himself): a failed candidate for the priesthood denied his vocation by the machinations and bungling of the Roman Catholic ecclesiastical machinery, and now living alone with his little yellow cat.

Rose is visited by two prominent churchmen, one a Cardinal Archbishop. The two propose to right the wrongs done to him, ordain him a priest, and take him to Rome where the Conclave to elect the new Pope has reached deadlock. When he arrives in Rome he finds that the Cardinals have been inspired to elect him as Pope. He accepts, and since the only previous English Pope was Adrian (or Hadrian) IV, he takes the name Hadrian VII.

The novel develops with this unconventional, chain-smoking Englishman peremptorily reforming the Church and the early 20th-century world, against inevitable opposition from the established Roman Catholic hierarchy, rewarding his friends and trouncing his enemies; generally he gets his way by charm or doggedness. His short reign is brought to an end when he is assassinated by a Scotsman, or possibly an Ulsterman, and the world breathes a sigh of relief.

== Influence on later works ==
In 1908 Rolfe resurrected the character of Hadrian for The Bull Against the Enemy of the Anglican Race, a violent attack on Lord Northcliffe and his newspaper, the Daily Mail, cast in the form of a Papal Bull issued by Hadrian VII.

The novel was made into a successful stage-play by Peter Luke, opening at the Mermaid Theatre, London in April 1968 and starring Alec McCowen as Fr. William Rolfe (not Rose). The subsequent Broadway production at the old Helen Hayes Theatre starred first McCowen, then Roderick Cook, and later, Barry Morse. It was also Morse who played in an Australian production and a USA national tour. In 1972, the play was also staged at the Vancouver Playhouse.

A satirical novel on a similar theme, which mentions Hadrian the Seventh in its bibliography, is Robert Player's Let's Talk of Graves, of Worms, of Epitaphs (1972).

The Translation of Father Torturo (2005), a novel by Brendan Connell about a priest's ruthless ascent to the papacy, is dedicated to "Frederick William Serafino Austin Lewis Mary Rolfe, Baron Corvo", "for the design which I so meanly twisted".

== Reception ==
In 2014, The Guardian placed Hadrian the Seventh on its list of the 100 best novels written in English. Robert McCrum called it "entertaining if contrived […] orchidaceous, eccentric and weirdly obsessive, some would say mad."
