= J. Thomas Looney =

English school teacher (1870–1944)

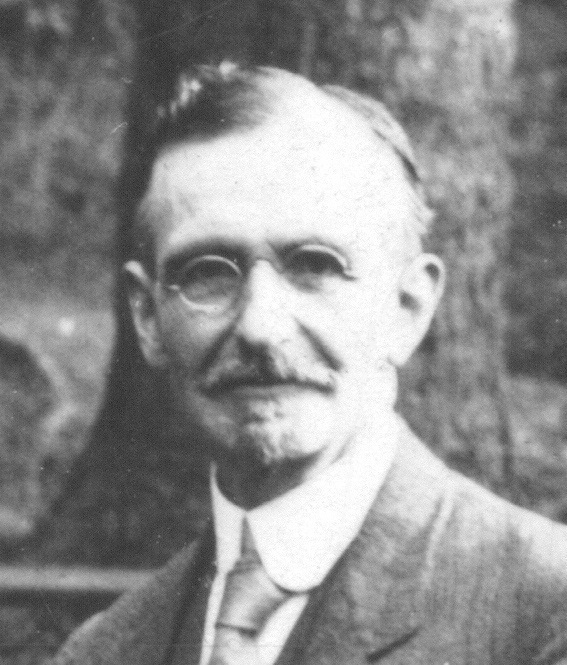
- Looney at around the time he wrote Shakespeare Identified
- Born: John Thomas Looney; 14 August 1870; South Shields, England
- Died: 17 January 1944 (aged 73); Swadlincote, England
- Occupations: School teacher, writer
- Years active: 1899–1944
- Notable work: Shakespeare Identified

John Thomas Looney (14 August 1870 – 17 January 1944) was an English school teacher who is notable for having originated the Oxfordian theory, which claims that Edward de Vere, 17th Earl of Oxford (1550–1604) was the true author of Shakespeare's plays.

Looney came from a Methodist religious background, but later converted to the rationalistic Religion of Humanity, becoming a leader of its church in Tyneside. After the failure of the local church, Looney turned to the Shakespeare authorship question, publishing in 1920 his theory that de Vere was the author of most of the poems and plays published in Shakespeare's name. He later argued that de Vere had also written works published under the names of other poets.

== Life ==
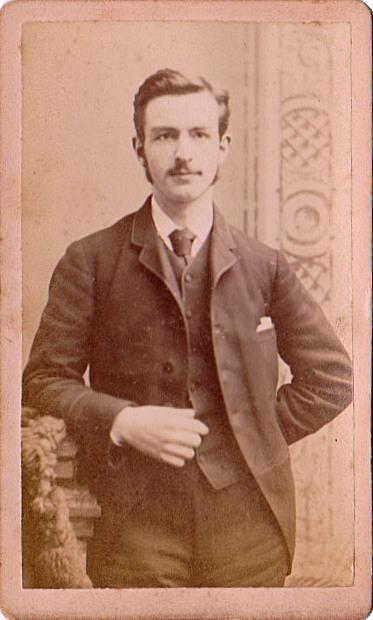
A carte-de-visite photograph of Looney as a young man c. 1890

Looney was born in South Shields to John Thomas and Annie Looney. His father had a shoe-making shop at 91 West Holborn in the centre of the town. Both his parents were Methodists. His family came from the Isle of Man and claimed descent from the Earls of Derby. He grew up in a strong evangelical environment, and determined to become a minister at the age of 16.

While studying at the Chester Diocesan College, he lost his faith. He later embraced the theories of the positivist philosopher Auguste Comte, becoming a proponent of the Comtean "Religion of Humanity" and a leader in the short-lived Church of Humanity, an independent British branch of the religion, in which he pioneered outdoor preaching. The Church of Humanity gave special prominence to Shakespeare, naming a month after him in the Positivist calendar, and placing a bust of him in its place of worship.

Looney worked as a school teacher in Gateshead. He is listed in Ward's Directory for 1899–1900 as a teacher living at 119 Rodsley Avenue, Gateshead. He later resided at 15 Laburnum Gardens, Low Fell.

After the failure of the Comtean church, Looney devoted himself to research into the authorship of Shakespeare's plays. He developed his theory during World War I, depositing his claim to priority in a sealed document at the British Museum in 1918. In 1920 he published his work, whose short title is Shakespeare Identified, through Cecil Palmer in London. Looney, who resisted his publisher's suggestion that he use a pseudonym, argued that the real author of Shakespeare's plays was Edward de Vere, Earl of Oxford, who fitted Looney's deductions that Shakespeare was, among much else, a nobleman of Lancastrian sympathies, with a fondness for Italy and a leaning towards Catholicism. Looney believed his argument followed the systematic methods prescribed by Positivism.

In 1922 he joined with George Greenwood to establish The Shakespeare Fellowship, the organisation which subsequently carried forward public discussion of the authorship question up to the 1940s. Looney acquired a number of followers and supporters, most notably Sigmund Freud, who read Looney's book in 1923. Even at the end of his life, in 1939, Freud repeats his view in the final revision of An Outline of Psychoanalysis.

Two of his followers, Percy Allen and B. M. Ward, developed the Prince Tudor theory, which claimed that Oxford and Queen Elizabeth I were lovers and had a son together. Looney was strongly opposed to the theory, writing that it was "extravagant & improbable" and "likely to bring the whole cause into ridicule."

Looney was a member of the Literary and Philosophical Society of Newcastle upon Tyne after 1911 and paid handsome tribute to the library; its unique system of operation, he said, "ensured an ease and rapidity of work which would be impossible in any other institution in the country". Looney presented the "Lit and Phil" with his edition of Edward de Vere's poems in December 1927.

He died at Swadlincote, near Burton-on-Trent, where he lodged after being forced to abandon his home in Gateshead because of the heavy German bombing of the area. He was survived by his daughters Evelyn and Gladys. Evelyn had a son who was given the middle name of De Vere.

== Theory ==
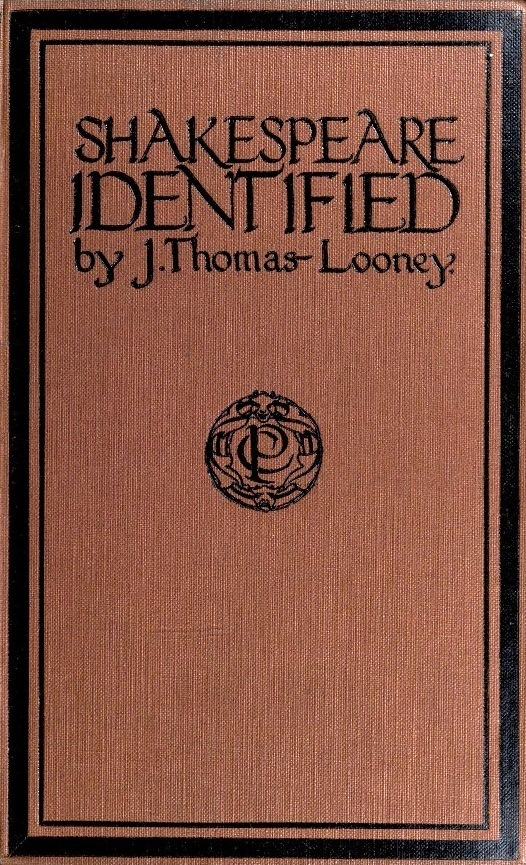
Looney's Shakespeare Identified (1920) began the modern Oxfordian movement and made Oxford the most popular anti-Stratfordian candidate.

Looney's book begins by outlining many of the familiar anti-Stratfordian arguments about Shakespeare of Stratford's supposedly poor education and unpoetic personality. He also criticises the methods adopted by many previous anti-Stratfordians, especially the Baconian tendency to search for ciphers. Looney considers it unlikely that an author who wished to conceal his identity would leave such messages. He then goes on to identify the influence of Frank Harris's book The Man Shakespeare, which uses the plays to find evidence of Shakespeare's beliefs and interests.

Looney states that it is possible to use this method to identify the type of person who must have written the works. He considered that lower class characters were portrayed as buffoons and that the author had no sympathy for the middle-classes. He was, however, dedicated to old-fashioned feudal ideals of nobility and service. He also believed in a highly structured, dutiful and ordered society.

For Looney the plays expressed a distinct political vision that combined elements of feudalism and modern scepticism towards traditional religion. He also believed that events and characters in the plays must correspond to the life of the author. Studying the biographies of Elizabethan aristocrats, he became convinced that Edward de Vere's career and personal experience could be mapped onto the action of the plays. Since de Vere died in 1604, many years before a number of Shakespeare's works appeared, Looney argued that there is an abrupt change in publication history and in the style of plays apparently written after 1604.

Unusually, Looney argued that The Tempest was not the work of Oxford/Shakespeare, but of another author. It had been mistakenly added to the canon. He argued that its style and the "dreary negativism" it promoted were inconsistent with Shakespeare's "essentially positivist" soul, and so could not have been written by Oxford. He also suggested that the evidence of other writers' hands in late plays such as Pericles, Prince of Tyre implied that the author had died, leaving them unfinished. Such works were completed and published by others, as were the sonnets, the dedication page of which implied to Looney that the author was deceased.

Looney expanded his views in later publications, especially his 1921 edition of de Vere's poetry. Looney suggested that de Vere was also responsible for some of the literary works published under the names of Arthur Golding, Anthony Munday and John Lyly.

== Reception and assessments ==
Oxfordians Warren Hope and Kim Holston, in recounting Looney's methodology, say that "[h]aving found someone who met all the conditions he had originally established, Looney devotes a chapter to a comparison of Oxford's verse with the early work of Shakespeare, a tour de force of literary and historical analysis which in some ways anticipates the procedures of the 'new criticism.'"

Looney's theory started a whole new avenue of speculation which gained innumerable supporters to the so called "Oxfordian" school of Shakespearian studies across the world, today, who can be considered his direct followers. This alternative authorship theory in particular represent a steady field of scholarship which challenges the English scholars, who still defend the historical attribution of the works in the canon to Shakespeare of Stratford.

== Publications ==
- Looney, J. Thomas. "Shakespeare" identified in Edward De Vere, the seventeenth earl of Oxford. London: C. Palmer, New York: Frederick A. Stokes Co. (1920)
- Looney, J. Thomas, ed. The poems of Edward De Vere, seventeenth earl of Oxford. London: C. Palmer (1921)

== Bibliography ==
- Jonathan Bate, "The genius of Shakespeare", Oxford University Press US, 1998, ISBN 0-19-512823-0, p. 68
- William F. and Elizabeth S. Friedman, "The Shakspearean Ciphers Examined", Cambridge University Press, 1957, p. 7
- Russ McDonald, "Shakespeare: an anthology of criticism and theory, 1945–2000", Wiley-Blackwell, 2004, ISBN 0-631-23488-8, pp. 4–8
- Samuel Schoenbaum, "Shakespeare's lives", Clarendon Press, 1970, pp. 597–598
- Richard F. Whalen, "Shakespeare – who was he?: the Oxford challenge to the Bard of Avon", Greenwood Publishing Group, 1994, ISBN 0-275-94850-1, pp. 68–69
- Bill Bryson, Shakespeare: The World as Stage, Atlas Books, an imprint of HarperCollins Press, 2007, ISBN 978-0-06-074022-1, pp. 188–191
- Passannanti, Erminia, "Who Speaks in the Text?" A Comparative Study of Authorship and Autenticity in Shakespeare, Transference, Joker Editions, ISBN 978-1-291-60733-8, pp. 23-48.
