= Sexuality of William Shakespeare =

The Chandos portrait of William Shakespeare, held in the National Portrait Gallery

The sexuality of English playwright William Shakespeare has been the subject of debate. It is known from public records that he married Anne Hathaway and had three children with her; scholars have examined their relationship through documents, and particularly through the bequests to her in his will. Some historians have speculated Shakespeare had affairs with other women, based on contemporaries' written anecdotes of such affairs and sometimes on the "Dark Lady" figure in his sonnets.

Some scholars have argued he was bisexual, based on analysis of the sonnets; many, including Sonnet 18, are love poems addressed to a man (the "Fair Youth"), and contain puns relating to homosexuality. However, other scholars have criticized this view, stating that these passages are referring to platonic friendship rather than sexual love. Another explanation is that the poems are not autobiographical but fiction, another of Shakespeare's "dramatic characterization[s]", so that the narrator of the sonnets should not be presumed to be Shakespeare himself.

== Marriage ==
At the age of 18, Shakespeare married the 26-year-old Anne Hathaway. The consistory court of the Diocese of Worcester issued a marriage license on 27 November 1582. Two of Hathaway's neighbours posted bonds the next day as surety that there were no impediments to the marriage. The couple may have arranged the ceremony in some haste, since the Worcester chancellor allowed the marriage banns to be read once instead of the usual three times. Hathaway's pregnancy could have been the reason for this. Six months after the marriage, she gave birth to a daughter, Susanna. Twins, son Hamnet and daughter Judith, followed almost two years later.

Literary historian Stephen Greenblatt argues that Shakespeare probably initially loved Hathaway, supporting this by referring to the theory that a passage in one of his sonnets (Sonnet 145) plays off Anne Hathaway's name, saying she saved his life (writing "I hate from hate away she threw/And saved my life, saying 'not you.'"). Nevertheless, after only three years of marriage Shakespeare left his family and moved to London. Greenblatt suggests that this may imply that he felt trapped by Hathaway. Other evidence to support this belief is that he and Anne were buried in separate (but adjoining) graves and, as has often been noted, Shakespeare's will makes no specific bequest to his wife aside from "the second best bed with the furniture". This may seem like a slight, but many historians contend that the second best bed was typically the marital bed, while the best bed was reserved for guests. The poem "Anne Hathaway" by Carol Ann Duffy endorses this view of the second best bed, having Anne say: "The bed we loved in was a spinning world of forests, castles, torchlight, clifftops, seas where we would dive for pearls." On the other hand, "In the other bed, the best, our guests dozed on, dribbling their prose". A bed missing from an inventory of Anne's brother's possessions (removed in contravention of their father's will) allows the explanation that the item was an heirloom from the Hathaway family that had to be returned. The law at the time also stated that the widow of a man was automatically entitled to a third of his estate, so Shakespeare did not need to mention specific bequests in the will.

== Possible affairs with women ==
While in London, Shakespeare may have had affairs with different women. One anecdote along these lines is provided by a lawyer named John Manningham, who wrote in his diary that Shakespeare had a brief affair with a woman during a performance of Richard III.

Upon a time when Burbage played Richard the Third there was a citizen grew so far in liking with him, that before she went from the play she appointed him to come that night unto her by the name of Richard the Third. Shakespeare, overhearing their conclusion, went before, was entertained and at his game ere Burbage came. Then, message being brought that Richard the Third was at the door, Shakespeare caused return to be made that William the Conqueror was before Richard the Third.

The Burbage referred to is Richard Burbage, the star of Shakespeare's company, who is known to have played the title role in Richard III. While this is one of the few surviving contemporary anecdotes about Shakespeare—it was made in March 1602, a month after Manningham had seen the play—some scholars are sceptical of its validity. Still, the anecdote suggests that at least one of Shakespeare's contemporaries (Manningham) believed that Shakespeare was attracted to women, even if he was not 'averse to an occasional infidelity to his marriage vows'. Indeed, its significance has been developed to affording Shakespeare a preference for "promiscuous women of little beauty and no breeding" in his honest acknowledgement that well-born women are beyond his reach.

An even less certain reference to an affair is a passage in the poem Willobie His Avisa, by Henry Willobie, which refers to Shakespeare's The Rape of Lucrece in the line "Shake-speare paints poor Lucrece' rape". Later in the poem there is a section in which "H.W." (Henry Willobie) and "W.S." discuss Willobie's love for "Avisa" in a verse conversation. This is introduced with a short explanatory passage:

W.S., who not long before had tried the courtesy of the like passion, and was now newly recovered ... he [Willobie] determined to see whether it would sort to a happier end for this new actor, than it did for the old player.

The fact that W.S. is referred to as a "player", and is mentioned after a complimentary comment on Shakespeare's poetry has led several scholars to conclude that Willobie is describing a conversation with Shakespeare about love affairs. "W.S." goes on to give Willobie advice about how to win over women.

Other possible evidence of other affairs are that twenty-six of Shakespeare's Sonnets are love poems addressed to a married woman (the so-called 'Dark Lady').

== Possible attraction to men ==
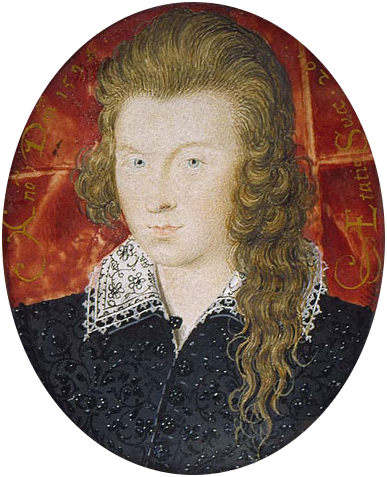
Henry Wriothesley, 3rd Earl of Southampton

Shakespeare's sonnets are cited as evidence of his bisexuality. The poems were initially published, perhaps without his approval, in 1609. 126 of them appear to be love poems addressed to a young man known as the 'Fair Lord' or 'Fair Youth'; this is often assumed to be the same person as the 'Mr W.H.' to whom the sonnets are dedicated. The identity of this figure (if he is indeed based on a real person) is unclear; the most popular candidates are Shakespeare's patrons, Henry Wriothesley, 3rd Earl of Southampton and William Herbert, 3rd Earl of Pembroke, both of whom were considered handsome in their youth.

Explicit references to sexual acts or physical lust also occur in the Dark Lady sonnets, which suggest that the poet and the Lady are lovers. Nevertheless, there are numerous passages in the sonnets addressed to the Fair Lord that express desire for a younger man. In Sonnet 13, he is called "dear my love", and Sonnet 15 announces that the poet is at "war with Time for love of you." Sonnet 18 asks "Shall I compare thee to a summer's day? / Thou art more lovely and more temperate", and in Sonnet 20 the narrator calls the younger man the "master-mistress of my passion". The poems refer to sleepless nights, anguish and jealousy caused by the youth. In addition, there is considerable emphasis on the young man's beauty: in Sonnet 20, the narrator theorises that the youth was originally a woman with whom Mother Nature had fallen in love and, to resolve the dilemma of lesbianism, added a penis ("pricked thee out for women's pleasure"), an addition the narrator describes as "to my purpose nothing". The line can be read literally as a denial of sexual interest. However, given the homoerotic tone of the rest of the sonnet, it could also be meant to appear disingenuous, mimicking the common sentiment of would-be seducers: 'it's you I want, not your body’. In Sonnet 20, the narrator tells the youth to sleep with women, but to love only him: "mine be thy love and thy love's use their treasure".

In some sonnets addressed to the youth, such as Sonnet 52, the erotic punning is particularly intense: "So is the time that keeps you as my chest, / Or as the wardrobe which the robe doth hide, / To make some special instant special blest, / By new unfolding his imprisoned pride." In Elizabethan bawdy, 'pride' is a euphemism for penis, especially an erect one.

Others have countered that these passages could be referring to intense platonic friendship, rather than sexual love. In the preface to his 1961 Pelican edition, Douglas Bush writes:

Since modern readers are unused to such ardor in masculine friendship and are likely to leap at the notion of homosexuality (a notion sufficiently refuted by the sonnets themselves), we may remember that such an ideal, often exalted above the love of women, could exist in real life, from Montaigne to Sir Thomas Browne, and was conspicuous in Renaissance literature.

Richard Dutton writes that the Shakespearean scholar A. L. Rowse never accepted that the Bard was homosexual to any extent at all, writing that "Shakespeare’s interest in the youth is not at all sexual". Dutton comments:

Rowse’s conviction on this point remained unshaken to his death, which is odd, not least because he himself was widely understood to be homosexual and wrote openly about writers like Marlowe and Wilde.

Another explanation is that the poems are not autobiographical but fiction, another of Shakespeare's "dramatic characterization[s]", so that the narrator of the sonnets should not be presumed to be Shakespeare himself.

In 1640, John Benson published a second edition of the sonnets in which he changed most of the pronouns from masculine to feminine so that readers would believe nearly all of the sonnets were addressed to the Dark Lady. Benson's modified version soon became the best-known text, and it was not until 1780 that Edmond Malone re-published the sonnets in their original forms.

The question of the sexual orientation of the sonnets' author was openly articulated in 1780, when George Steevens, upon reading Shakespeare's description of a young man as his "master-mistress" remarked, "it is impossible to read this fulsome panegyrick, addressed to a male object, without an equal mixture of disgust and indignation". Other scholars concurred with Samuel Taylor Coleridge's comment, made around 1800, that Shakespeare's love was "pure" and in his sonnets there is "not even an allusion to that very worst of all possible vices". Robert Browning, writing of Wordsworth's assertion that "with this key [the Sonnets] Shakespeare unlocked his heart", famously replied in his poem House, "If so, the less Shakespeare he!"

Oscar Wilde addressed the issue of the dedicatee of the sonnets in his 1889 short story "The Portrait of Mr. W. H." in which he identified Will Hughes, a boy actor in Shakespeare's company, as both "Mr W. H." and the "Fair Youth".

The controversy continued in the 20th century. By 1944, the Variorum edition of the sonnets contained an appendix with the conflicting views of nearly forty commentators. In the year after "the law in Britain decriminalized homosexual acts between consenting males over twenty-one", the historian G. P. V. Akrigg published the first extended study of the Earl of Southampton, "who he had no doubt was the 'fair youth' of the sonnets." Akrigg wrote, "One is forced to suspect that some element of homosexuality lay at the root of the trouble . . . The love which he felt for Southampton may well have been the most intense emotion of his life."

Literary theorist Stephen Greenblatt, in writing about sexuality within Southampton’s world, "assumes that something went on—'whether they only stared longingly at one another or embraced, kissed passionately, went to bed together'".

Stanley Wells also addressed the topic in Looking for Sex in Shakespeare (2004), arguing that a balance had yet to be drawn between the deniers of any possible homoerotic expression in the sonnets and more recent, liberal commentators who have "swung too far in the opposite direction" and allowed their own sensibilities to influence their understanding. One element that complicates the question of Shakespeare's sexuality is that same-sex friendships in the Renaissance were often characterized by shows of affection (e.g., bed sharing, confessions of love) that contemporary readers associate with modern-day sexual relationships. Academic Jonathan Bate opined that "there are indeed powerful same-sex relationships in the plays, suggesting that, whatever he got up to in the bedroom, at the very least he had a bisexual imagination."

A scholarly dispute on the matter occurred in the letters pages of The Times Literary Supplement in 2014.

In 2025, a privately owned, previously unknown, miniature portrait by Nicholas Hilliard of Henry Wriothesley was reported. The back of the portrait, which is on a playing card, has had the card's red heart painted over with a black arrow. Art historian Elizabeth Goldring suggests that it could be seen as resembling the spear on the Shakespeare coat of arms, and speculates that Shakespeare could have been the original recipient of the miniature, but returned it to the Earl at some point, perhaps after his marriage in 1598, with his personal mark obliterating the heart.
