= To W.H. =

2006 play by Stuart Draper

- Original language: English
- Written by: Stuart Draper

Premiere
- Date: 2006

To W.H. is a play that examines the potential sexuality of William Shakespeare and the identity of "W.H." who has been referred to a number of times in Shakespeare's work. The play was written by Stuart Draper, directed by Anton Krause and first played in Hobgoblin Pub Theatre in London in spring 2006.

== Reception ==
The play has received a great deal of attention, due both to its playwright/actor and because of its content. The British Theatre Guide wrote, "Funny and poignant, To WH takes the audience through Shakespeare's life, from his first ill-fated meeting with WH, to his death in Stratford. Punctuated by blues-style renditions of the sonnets from the Dark Lady herself, To WH finally bangs the nail into the coffin of Shakespeare's heterosexuality", while The Stage reviewed and wrote, "Anton Krause’s production is rather rough around the edges but it’s performed with warmth and humour". Indie London opined, "To W.H. combines the soul and passion of Shakespeare’s sonnets (the majority of which were written to a Mr W.H.) with the exuberance and bawdiness that characterise his most exciting comedies.", while the UK Theatre Web writes, "Stuart Draper has written a pacy romp which interlaces a large amount of Shakespeare’s writing...", and "Draper plays Shakespeare with gusto, delighting in the fact that, like the bard, what’s the point if the playwright doesn’t give himself the best parts? Alongside his clowning and wit, he shows the loneliness and despair to give a rounded character"

== See also ==
- Willie Hughes
- Shakespeare's sonnets
