= The Passionate Pilgrim =

Anthology of poems associated with Shakespeare

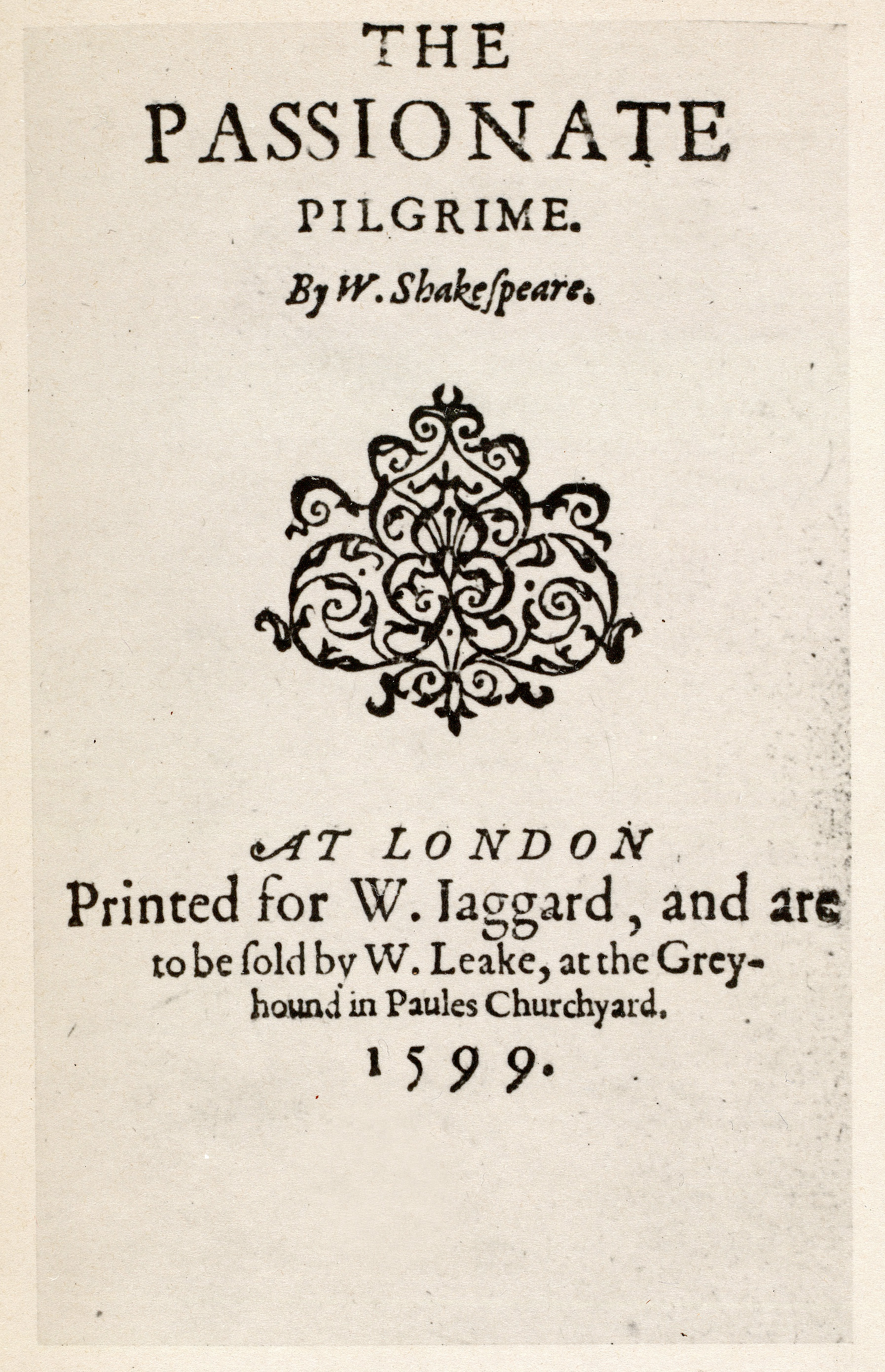
Title page of the second edition of The Passionate Pilgrim (1599), from a copy in the Huntington Library

The Passionate Pilgrim (1598 or 1599) is an anthology of 21 poems collected and published by William Jaggard that were attributed to "W. Shakespeare" on the title page, only five of which are considered authentically Shakespearean. These are two sonnets, later to be published in the 1609 collection of Shakespeare's Sonnets, and three poems extracted from the play Love's Labour's Lost. Five were attributed to other poets during his lifetime, and two were published in other collections anonymously. While most critics disqualify the rest as not Shakespearean on stylistic grounds, stylometric analysis by Ward Elliott and Robert Valenza put two blocks of the poems (4, 6, 7 and 9, and 10, 12, 13 and 15) within Shakespeare's stylistic boundaries. Jaggard later published an augmented edition with poems he knew to be by Thomas Heywood.

== Textual history ==
The Passionate Pilgrim was first published in an octavo volume by William Jaggard, probably in 1599 or possibly the year before, since the printer, probably Thomas Judson, had set up shop after September 1598. (Note: Duncan-Jones thinks that the printer of the first edition remains unidentified.) The date cannot be fixed with certainty, as the work was not entered in the Stationers' Register and the title page of the first edition is not extant. The last six poems are preceded by a second title page, headed Sonnets to Sundry Notes of Musicke, although the reason for the division is not clear.

The first edition survives only in two sheets, forming eleven leaves comprising poems 1–5 and 16–18, preserved in a fragmentary composite copy at the Folger Shakespeare Library, intermixed with sheets of the second edition that were probably added to replace defective leaves.

In addition to the sheets incorporated into the Folger Library copy of the first edition, two complete copies of the second edition dated 1599 survive, one in the Wren Library of Trinity College, Cambridge, and the other in the Huntington Library. The title page of this edition states that the book is to be sold by stationer William Leake, who had obtained the rights to Shakespeare's Venus and Adonis in 1596 and published five octavo editions of that poem (the third edition through the eighth) between 1599 and 1602.

Jaggard issued an expanded edition of The Passionate Pilgrim in 1612, containing additional poems on the theme of Helen of Troy, announced on the title page ("Whereunto is newly added two Love Epistles, the first from Paris to Hellen, and Hellen's answere back again to Paris"). These were in fact taken from Thomas Heywood's Troia Britannica, which Jaggard had published in 1609. Heywood protested the "manifest injury done to me" in his Apology for Actors (1612), writing that Shakespeare too was "much offended" with Jaggard for making "so bold with his name", a complaint that apparently led Jaggard to revise the title page and remove Shakespeare's name. Two copies of the third edition survive, one in the Folger Library with the original title page, and the other in the Bodleian Library at the University of Oxford with the cancel title page omitting Shakespeare's name.

The poems in The Passionate Pilgrim were reprinted in John Benson's 1640 edition of Shakespeare's Poems, along with the Sonnets, A Lover's Complaint, The Phoenix and the Turtle, and other pieces. Thereafter the anthology was included in collections of Shakespeare's poems, in Bernard Lintott's 1709 edition and subsequent editions.

== Variants between editions ==
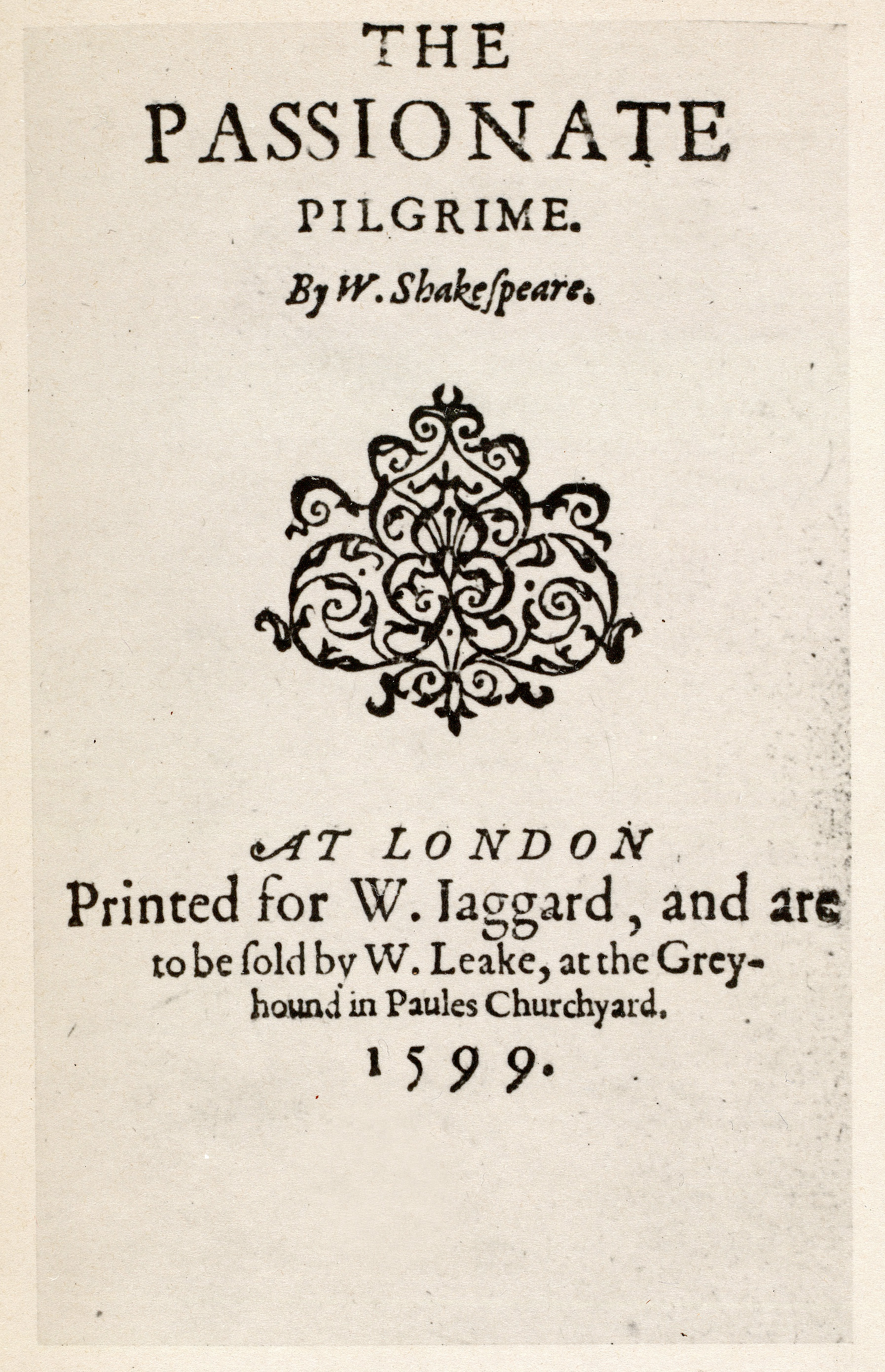
Title page of The Passionate Pilgrim O2 (1599)

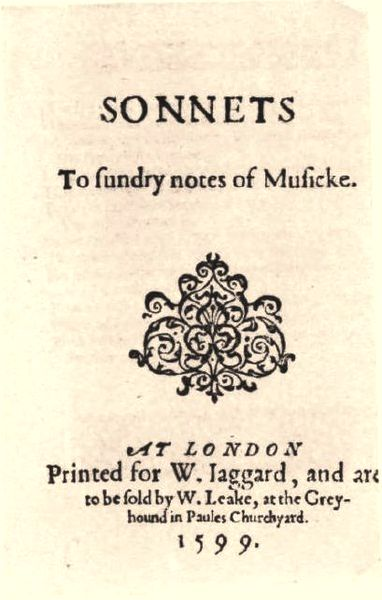
Secondary title page included within The Passionate Pilgrim O2 (1599)

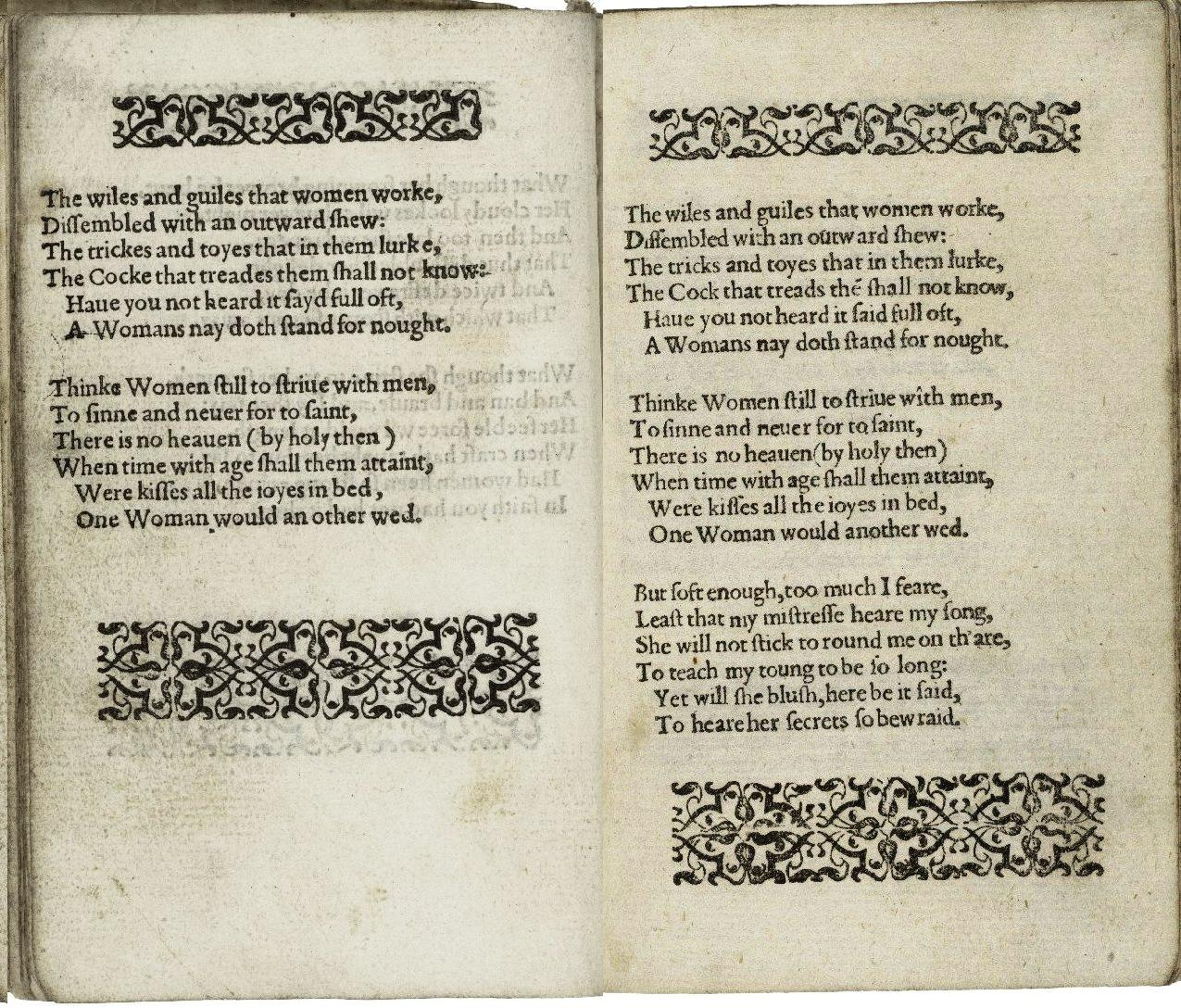
Comparison of PP 18 beginning with the seventh stanza. Left: O1, right: O2

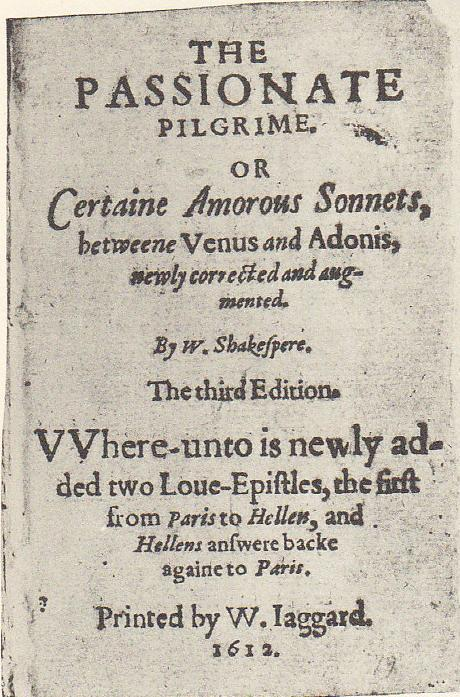
Title page of The Passionate Pilgrim O3 (1612)

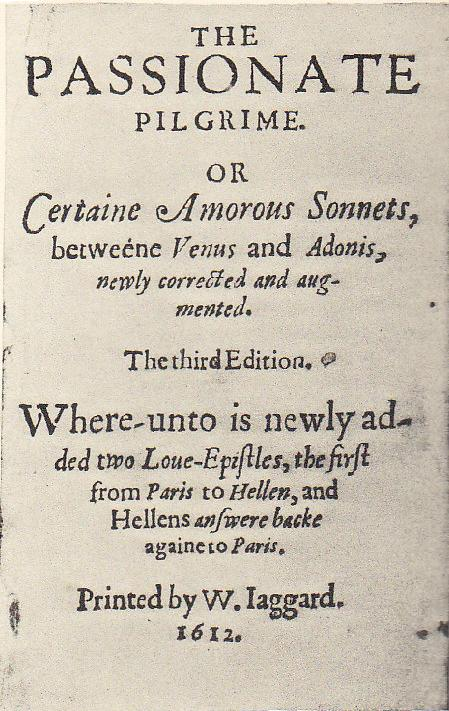
Revised title page of The Passionate Pilgrim O3 (1612)

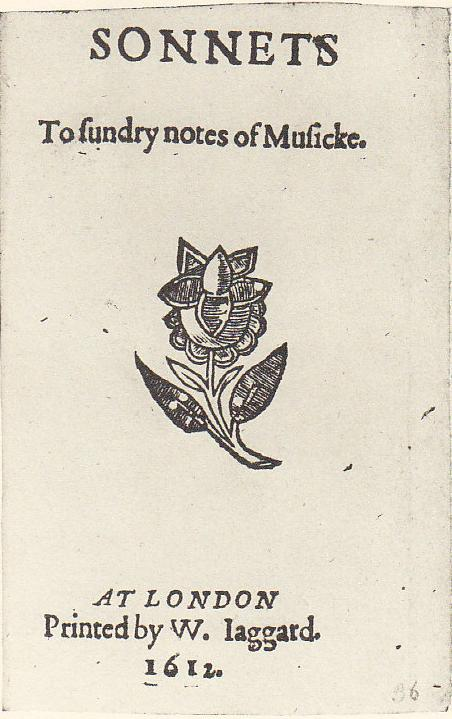
Secondary title page included within The Passionate Pilgrim O3 (1612)

== The poems (1599 edition) ==
Number	Author	First line	Notes
1	William Shakespeare	"When my love swears that she is made of truth"	First publication, later appears as Sonnet 138 in Shakespeare's Sonnets.
2	William Shakespeare	"Two loves I have, of comfort and despair"	First publication, later appears as Sonnet 144 in Shakespeare's Sonnets.
3	William Shakespeare	"Did not the heavenly rhetoric of thine eye"	A Version of Longaville's sonnet to Maria in Love's Labour's Lost 4.3.58–71.
4	Unknown	"Sweet Cytherea, sitting by a brook"	On the theme of Venus and Adonis, as is Shakespeare's narrative poem.
5	William Shakespeare	"If love make me forsworn, how shall I swear to love?"	A version of Berowne's sonnet to Rosaline in Love's Labour's Lost 4.2.105–18.
6	Unknown	"Scarce had the sun dried up the dewy morn"	On the theme of Venus and Adonis, as is Shakespeare's narrative poem.
7	Unknown	"Fair is my love, but not so fair as fickle"	In the same six-line stanza format as Venus and Adonis.
8	Richard Barnfield	"If music and sweet poetry agree"	First published in Poems in Diverse Humours (1598).
9	Unknown	"Fair was the morn when the fair queen of love"	On the theme of Venus and Adonis, as is Shakespeare's narrative poem.
10	Unknown	"Sweet rose, fair flower, untimely pluck'd, soon vaded"	In the same six-line stanza format as Venus and Adonis.
11	Bartholomew Griffin	"Venus, with young Adonis sitting by her"	Printed in Fidessa (1596). On the theme of Venus and Adonis, as is Shakespeare's narrative poem.
12	Possibly Thomas Deloney	"Crabbed age and youth cannot live together"	Was reprinted with additional stanzas in Thomas Deloney's The Garland of Good Will entered into the Stationer's Register in March 1593. Deloney died in 1600; he might be the author of 12, though collections of his verse issued after his death contain poems by other authors. Critic Hallett Smith has identified poem 12 as the one most often favoured by readers as possibly Shakespearean, but goes on to say that nothing supports the attribution. Elliot and Valenza, however, say their modal analysis indicates that the poem tests as "strikingly Shakespearean".
13	Unknown	"Beauty is but a vain and doubtful good"	In the same six-line stanza format as Venus and Adonis.
14	Unknown	"Good-night, good rest, ah, neither be my share"	In the same six-line stanza format as Venus and Adonis. Originally published as two poems; some scholars, therefore, consider them as 14 and 15, adding 1 to all subsequent poem numbers.
15	Unknown	"Lord how mine eyes throw gazes to the East"	
16	Unknown	"It was a lording's daughter, the fairest one of three"	First poem of the section titled "Sonnets to Sundry Notes of Music".
17	William Shakespeare	"On a day (alack the day)"	Dumaine's poem to Catherine in Love's Labour's Lost 4.3.99–118. Reprinted in England's Helicon (1600).
18	Unknown	"My flockes feed not, my ewes breed not"	First printed in Thomas Weelkes' Madrigals to 3, 4, 5 and 6 Voices (1597).
19	Unknown	"When as thine eye hath chose the dame"	Three versions of the poem exist in manuscript miscellanies.
20	Christopher Marlowe & Sir Walter Raleigh	"Live with me and be my love"	An inferior text of Marlowe's poem "The Passionate Shepherd to His Love" followed by the first stanza of Sir Walter Raleigh's "The Nymph's Reply to the Shepherd"
21	Richard Barnfield	"As it fell upon a day"	First published in Poems in Divers Humors (1598).

== See also ==
- Shakespeare Apocrypha

== Sources ==
- Adams, Joseph Quincy, ed. (1939). "Introduction". Passionate Pilgrim. Scribner's.
- Duncan-Jones, Katherine; Woudhuysen, H. R., eds. (2007). Shakespeare's Poems. The Arden Shakespeare, Third Series. London: Bloomsbury. ISBN 978-1-90343-686-8.
- Elliott, Ward; Valenza, Robert J. (1991). "A Touchstone for the Bard". Computers and the Humanities. 25 (4). Association for Computers and the Humanities: 199–209. doi:10.1007/BF00116075. ISSN 0010-4817. S2CID 31773979.
- Halliday, F. E. (1964). A Shakespeare Companion 1564–1964. Penguin Books.
- Prince, F. T., ed. (1960). The Poems. The Arden Shakespeare, Second Series. London: Methuen.
- Roe, John (2006). "Textual Analysis". In Roe, John (ed.). The Poems: Venus and Adonis, The Rape of Lucrece, The Phoenix and the Turtle, The Passionate Pilgrim, A Lover's Complaint. Cambridge University Press. pp. 296–305. ISBN 978-0-5216-7162-0.
- Smith, Hallett (1974). "The Passionate Pilgrim". In Evans, G. Blakemore (ed.). The Riverside Shakespeare. Houghton Mifflin. pp. 1787–94. ISBN 0-395-04402-2.
