= Bartholomew Griffin =

English poet

Bartholomew Griffin (fl. 1596) was an English poet. He is known for his Fidessa sequence of sonnets, published in 1596.

== Works ==
In August 1572 the Queen made a progress to Warwick, spending several days at Kenilworth Castle as guest of the Earl of Leicester. At this time a portion of the entertainment for Elizabeth was the reading of some Latin verses composed by a “Mr. Griffin" - this may have been Barthlomew Griffin. Griffin wrote a series of 62 sonnets entitled Fidessa, more chaste than kinde, London, 1596. The dedication to Sir William Essex, 1st Baronet of Lambourn, Berkshire is followed by an epistle to the gentlemen of the Inns of Court, from which it might be inferred that Griffin himself belonged to an Inn, but no trace of him can be found in the registers. The third sonnet in Fidessa, beginning ‘Venus and yong Adonis sitting by her,’ was reproduced in 1599 in The Passionate Pilgrime.
