= Thomas Judson (printer) =

Thomas Judson (fl. 1584-1600) was an Elizabethan printer, best known for printing William Jaggard's first two editions of The Passionate Pilgrim (1599), which Jaggard attributed to William Shakespeare.

Thomas obtained his freedom of the Company by patrimony in January 1581. He was a son of the very prominent Tudor printer John Judson, Stationer in London from c. 1542 until his death in 1589. John was already a senior member of the Worshipful Company of Stationers at its incorporation by Queen Mary in 1557, and was Warden of the Company in 1560-61, 1562-63 and 1570-71, and Master of the Company in 1587-88. In 1569 John Judson operated from the Sign of the Hedghogg in Paul's Churchyard. In his will of 4 May 1588 John left his stock of money held by the Stationers for partnerships to his widow Alice for life, and then to descend to his son Thomas (notwithstanding that Thomas was the second-named of his two sons, and both were to be his Overseers). On 6 May 1592 a dinner for Mistress Judson was held at Stationers' Hall, for which Thomas contributed forty shillings.

In business Thomas Judson was the partner of John Windet. They were in joint occupation of a house called the White Bear in Addle or Addling Hill, near Baynard's Castle, near to, or the same as, premisses later occupied by the printer Valentine Simmes. In early 1600 he sold his business to the printer John Harrison III.
