= Willie Hughes =

Possible dedicatee of Shakespeare's sonnets

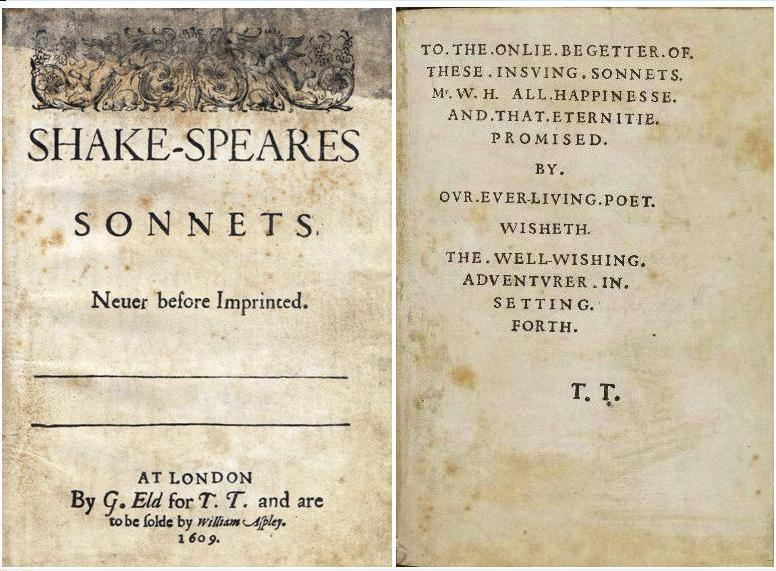
Title and dedication of Shakespeare's Sonnets (1609) to "Mr. W. H.".

William Hughes is one potential candidate for the person on whom the "Fair Youth" of Shakespeare's Sonnets is based (if the sonnets are autobiographical). The "Fair Youth" is a handsome, effeminate young man to whom the poet addresses many passionate sonnets. Some sonnets can be interpreted as puns on the name "William Hughes". However, no real life person of that name can easily be identified with the character.

== Thomas Tyrwhitt theory ==
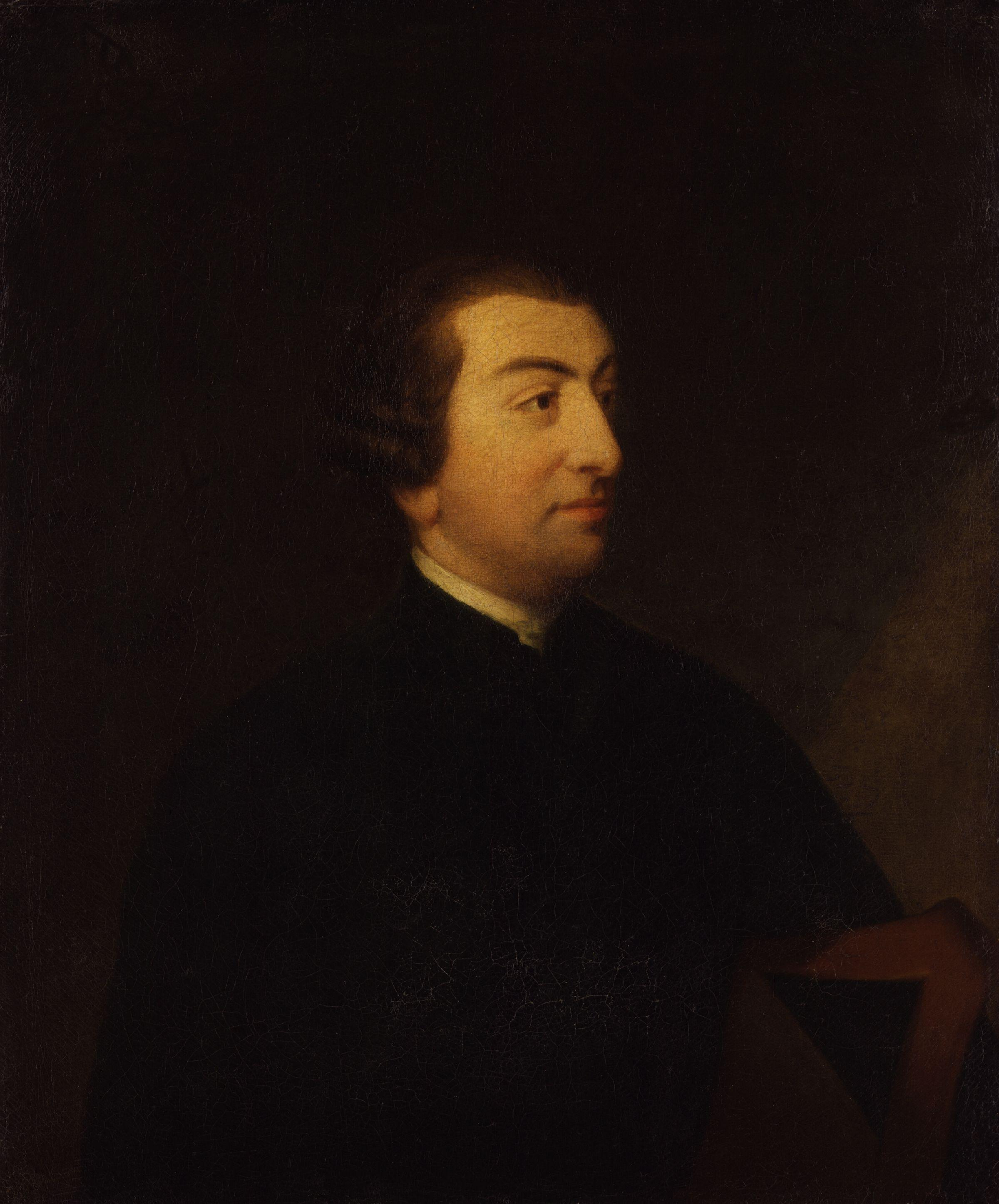
Thomas Tyrwhitt, by unknown artist, given to the National Portrait Gallery, London in 1938.

The identification was first proposed by Thomas Tyrwhitt in the eighteenth century, who noted a line in the 20th Sonnet "A man in hue, all Hues in his controlling", in which the word Hues is both italicised and capitalised in the original edition. When this is combined with various puns in the Sonnets on the name 'Will', and the fact that the sonnets are dedicated to one "Mr W.H.", it can be argued that the Sonnets covertly reveal that they are written to someone called William Hughes. Since music plays an important role in the sonnets, Tyrwhitt suggested that Hughes was a musician and an actor. A musician of that name is known to have served Walter Devereux, 1st Earl of Essex, but he would have been considerably older than Shakespeare.

In his influential 1790 edition of the sonnets Edmond Malone endorsed Tyrwhitt's suggestion, giving it wide circulation among scholars. He noted that Tyrwhitt had pointed out the "man in hue" line, "which inclines me to think that the initials W.H. stand for W. Hughes", "to this person, whoever he was, one hundred and twenty of the following poems are addressed."

Later writers took differing views. Some asserted that the capitalisation and italics were common in the Sonnets and did not imply that a proper name was being used. Others were willing to endorse the idea. In 1873, C.E. Brown was the first to connect Hughes with Essex's musician, suggesting that Shakespeare would have known "Will Hughes the favourite musician of the old Earl of Essex", who was mentioned in writings by Edward Waterhouse, Essex's secretary. Hughes is referred to as a musician who is called upon by the dying Earl to play music on the virginals to soothe his passage. However, his name also appears as Hayes or Howes.

== Oscar Wilde short story ==
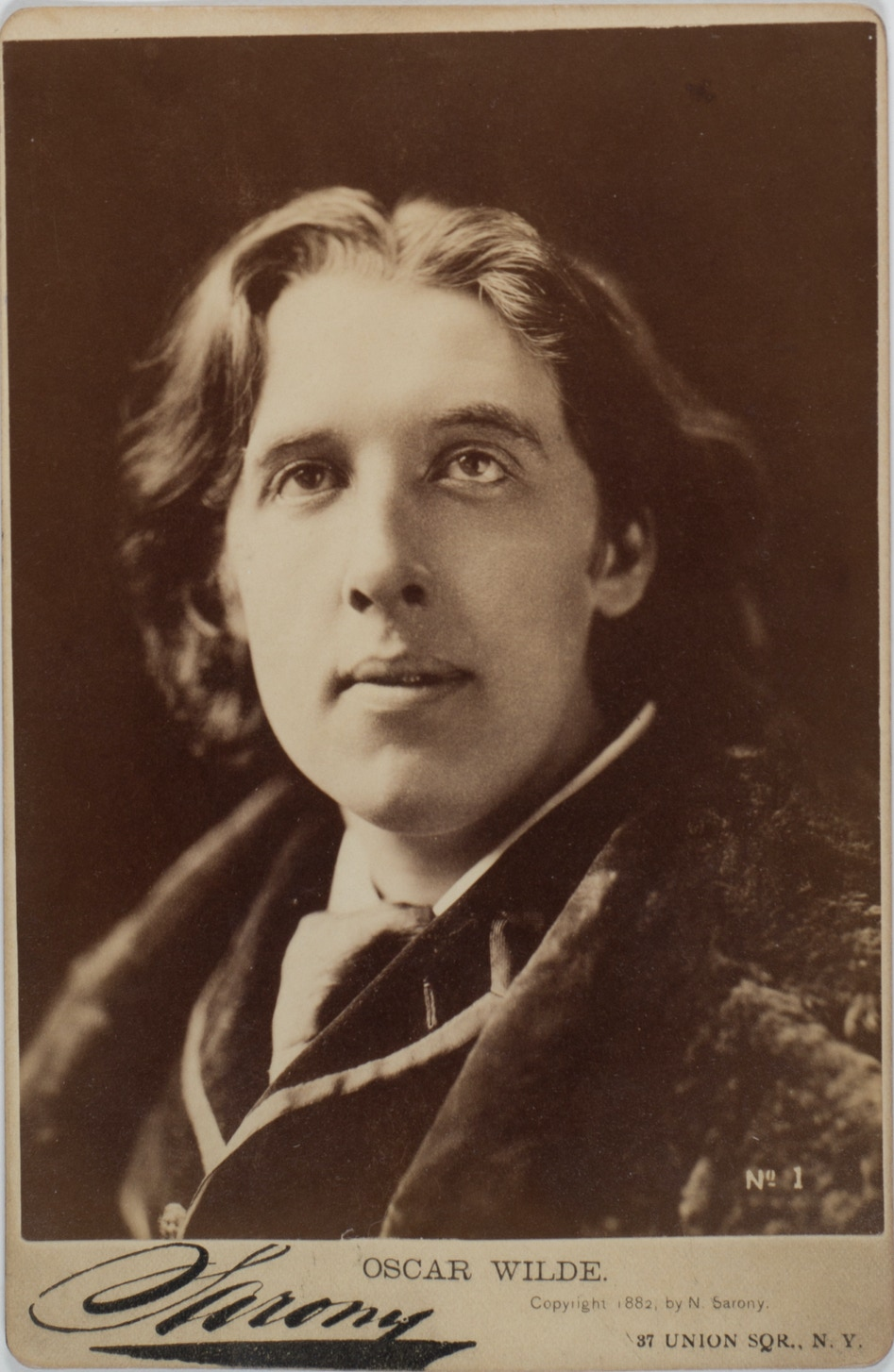
Portrait of Oscar Wilde, New York, 1882

The idea was explored in greater detail by Oscar Wilde in his short story "The Portrait of Mr. W. H.", in which Hughes is transmuted from a musician into a seductive boy-actor working in Shakespeare's company. Wilde uses the story to explain and expand the theory, which the story's unnamed narrator claims is the only one to fit exactly with the poet's words. In the story it is assumed that the conventional prime contender for the true identity of Mr. W.H. is William Herbert, 3rd Earl of Pembroke. The narrator is introduced to the Hughes theory by a friend, Erskine, who argues that W.H. "could not have been anybody of high birth", citing Sonnets 25, 124 and 125. He also argues that the puns in Sonnets 135 and 143 make it clear that the Fair Youth's first name was Will, excluding the other popular candidate, Henry Wriothesley, 3rd Earl of Southampton.

Though the story is fiction, and Wilde himself never publicly endorsed the theory, the argument presented has often been cited since. However, the references to "Will" in the poems are often read as a pun on the author's own name, and no.135 and 143 are widely believed to be addressed to the Dark Lady, not the Fair Youth.

== Later writers ==
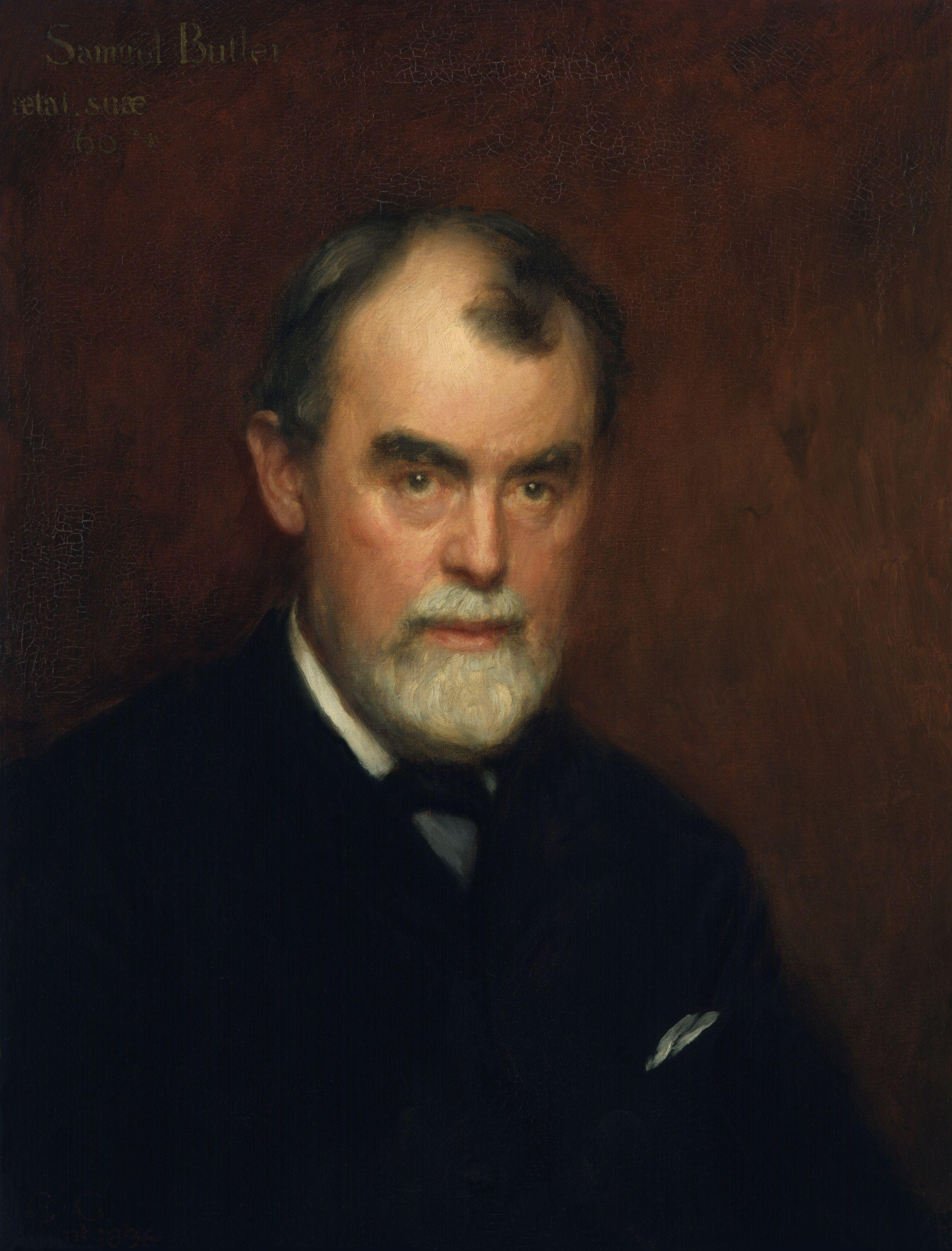
Samuel Butler, by Charles Gogin, National Portrait Gallery, London.

After Wilde the Hughes theory was pursued by other writers. Novelist Samuel Butler, author of The Way of All Flesh, accepted some aspects of it, regarding the name 'Will Hughes' as a "plausible conjecture". He identified him with a real William Hughes who was a ship's cook and who died in 1636. W.B. Brown identified puns on "Hughes" in the repeated deployment of the words "use" and "unused", along with the words "form", "image", "shape" and "shadow", which he interpreted as variants of the concept "hues". Lord Alfred Douglas, Wilde's former lover, argued in The True History of Shakespeare's Sonnets that Wilde had believed the Hughes theory. He endorsed Butler's version of it.

The writer Percy Allen created a new twist on the theory when he claimed in 1934 that Hughes was the illegitimate son of Edward de Vere, 17th Earl of Oxford and Queen Elizabeth I. In accordance with the Oxfordian theory, Allen believed that de Vere was the true author of Shakespeare's plays and sonnets. He believed that Hughes became an actor who also used the same pseudonym as his father. De Vere wrote the sonnets for his son, giving a coded account of his relationship to the "dark lady", the Queen. Allen's speculations were the model for what became known as the Prince Tudor theory.

Clarkson, in Saturday Review of Literature, identified a William Hughes who was the translator of Mirror of Justices in 1646. He was possibly a student in the first decade of the 17th century. An article in the Times Literary Supplement in 1938 argued that there was an apprentice shoemaker by that name who was employed by Christopher Marlowe's father, and may have travelled to London with Marlowe to become an actor, meeting Shakespeare there.

Most later scholars of the Sonnets have rejected or ignored the theory due to the lack of corroborative evidence for the existence of Hughes.

== See also ==
- To W.H. (2006 play)
