= Stuart Draper =

British actor, playwright and theatre director

Stuart B Draper (born 1967) is a British actor, playwright and theatre director. He also teaches at the South London Theatre.

== Personal ==
Draper graduated from Durham University and trained at LAMDA.

== Career ==
=== As playwright ===
Works include the 2006 performance at the South London Theatre in March and then the Greenwich Playhouse of which Indie London wrote, "This follows its success, not only with audiences but also with critics, when it was performed by the South London Youth Theatre in March this year",

An adaptation of Two Gentlemen of Verona, of which Gaydar Nation wrote, "Adapted by director, Stuart Draper this colourful new version of William Shakespeare's Gentlemen of Verona sees a brace of clowns, a dog, a troupe of gay bandits and four star-crossed, mismatched lovers battling for love and honour under the Mediterranean sun."

To W.H., of which Indie London wrote, "To W.H. combines the soul and passion of Shakespeare’s sonnets (the majority of which were written to a Mr W.H.) with the exuberance and bawdiness that characterise his most exciting comedies", The Stage wrote, "Stuart Draper’s new play, in which he also stars, runs with the theory that the initials were those of William Herbert, future Earl of Pembroke", and " his Bard is besotted with the young nobleman when they first meet and, though Herbert is 20 years his junior, they go on to have a full blown affair", and UK Theatre Web wrote, "Stuart Draper has written a pacy romp which interlaces a large amount of Shakespeare’s writing. There are weaknesses: the opening of each half is slow, the sung sonnets drag, the Dark Lady is under-developed. The time shift is not thoroughly worked through, but allows knowing nods to the present. However, the whole conceit has more to like than condemn."

Of his August 2008 presentation of his play Paper Moons, Tamara Gausi wrote, "Draper neither stands over nor sentimentalises any of his characters, allowing this heartfelt depiction of teenage angst to entertain, but also to touch".

=== As actor ===
He was well received for his role in the play Hot Mikado by the Bexley Times which wrote, "In a good cast, Stuart Draper shone brightest as the Lord High Executioner Ko-Ko, a blustering, avaricious coward in a pink suit who would have given Rik Mayall or Alexi Sayle a run for their money in the comedy stakes.". Jonathan Gibbs of Time Out said, "...This (includes) a largely amusing pub quiz skit by Matthew Wilkie featuring Stuart Draper as sad-sack George, who has unwisely bet a grand that his team win on the very night it disintegrates all together"
