= The Portrait of Mr. W. H. =

1889 short story by Oscar Wilde

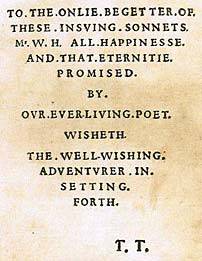
The dedication to Mr. W. H. in the first edition of the sonnets

"The Portrait of Mr. W. H." is a story written by Oscar Wilde, first published in Blackwood's Magazine in July 1889. It was later added to the collection Lord Arthur Savile's Crime and Other Stories, though it does not appear in early editions.

An enlarged edition planned by Wilde, almost twice as long as the Blackwood's version, with cover illustration by Charles Ricketts, did not proceed and only came to light after Wilde's death. According to Wilde's grandson Merlin Holland, potential publishers "felt that even the literary treatment of same-sex love was too dangerous a subject to handle". This was published in limited edition by Mitchell Kennerley in New York in 1921, and in a first regular English edition by Methuen in 1958, edited by Vyvyan Holland.

The story is about an attempt to uncover the identity of Mr. W. H., the enigmatic dedicatee of Shakespeare's Sonnets. It is based on a theory, originated by Thomas Tyrwhitt, that the sonnets were addressed to one Willie Hughes, portrayed in the story as a boy actor who specialized in playing women in Shakespeare's company. This theory depends on the assumption that the dedicatee is also the Fair Youth who is the subject of most of the poems. The only evidence for this theory is the text of a number of sonnets themselves (such as Sonnet 20, that makes puns on the words "Will" and "Hues").

== Plot summary ==
Wilde's story is narrated by a friend of a man called Erskine, who is preoccupied by the Hughes theory. Erskine had learned the idea from one Cyril Graham, who had tried to persuade Erskine of it based on the text of the sonnets, but Erskine was frustrated by the lack of external historical evidence for Willie Hughes's existence. Graham tried to find such evidence but failed; instead, he fakes a portrait of Hughes in which Hughes is depicted with his hand on a book on which can be seen the dedication from the sonnets. Erskine is convinced by this evidence, but then discovers the portrait to be a fake, a discovery that leads him to yet again doubt the existence of Willie Hughes. Graham still believes in the theory, and to prove it, shoots himself.

Erskine recounts these events to the narrator, who is so struck by the Willie Hughes theory that he begins his own research and further fleshes out Graham's findings until he is without a doubt convinced that Willie Hughes was real and so was the subject of the sonnets. He presents the evidence to Erskine but then finds himself strangely divested from it and loses faith in its basis in reality.

Erskine's belief, however, is renewed; he sets off at once to try to find a trace of Willie Hughes. But like Graham, he finds nothing. The narrator maintains that there was nothing to be found—that Hughes never existed. Erskine sends him a letter, in which he tells him that the truth is in front of him and, as a sign of complete faith in it, is now twice stained with blood. His friend goes to his hotel in Cannes and finds Erskine dead.

He assumes Erskine committed suicide like Graham, but the doctor tells him the real cause was a lingering illness that Erskine had known about for some months; he had come to Cannes specifically to die. He left his friend the portrait of Mr. W. H. The portrait now hangs in his home, where many comment on it, but he does not tell of its history. He sometimes wonders to himself, however, if it might be true after all.

== Influence ==
It is not known whether or not Wilde himself subscribed to the theory presented in the story. His lover Lord Alfred Douglas stated that he did believe it. Samuel Butler accepted some aspects of it, regarding the name "Will Hughes" as a "plausible conjecture".

Wilde's story may have been an influence on John Masefield, whose book Shakespeare and Spiritual Life (1924) suggests that the Fair Youth was an actor who was delicate and small enough to play parts such as the boy-servant Moth in Love's Labours Lost and the sprite Ariel in The Tempest. He believed that he may even have been a kind of symbol to Shakespeare for his own creative genius.

In James Joyce's novel Ulysses, a character called Mr. Best says that Wilde's theory is "the most brilliant" of all identifications. However, Mr. Best identifies Hughes with Shakespeare himself, a mistake quickly corrected by the Quaker librarian. André Gide also expressed approval, stating that the theory was "the only, not merely plausible, but possible, interpretation".

In G. S. Viereck's novel My First Two Thousand Years, the protagonist, the Wandering Jew, watches a performance given by Willie Hughes, who is "positively enchanting as Juliet". He learns that Shakespeare had dedicated his sonnets to the boy-actor, but when he meets him he discovers that the boy is actually a girl in disguise. Shakespeare knew this, and the girl blushingly admits that this is why he called her "the master-mistress of my passion".
