= Sonnet 1 =

» Sonnet 1
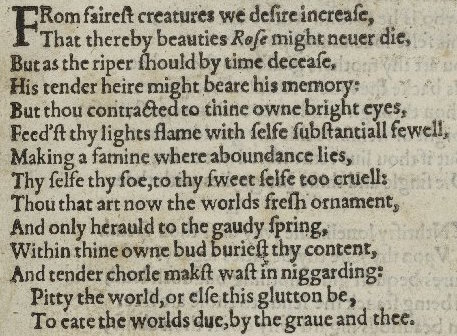
- Sonnet 1 in the 1609 Quarto
Q1
Q2
Q3
C
From fairest creatures we desire increase,
That thereby beauty’s rose might never die,
But as the riper should by time decease
His tender heir might bear his memory:
But thou, contracted to thine own bright eyes,
Feed’st thy light’s flame with self-substantial fuel,
Making a famine where abundance lies,
Thyself thy foe, to thy sweet self too cruel.
Thou that art now the world’s fresh ornament,
And only herald to the gaudy spring,
Within thine own bud buriest thy content,
And, tender churl, mak’st waste in niggarding.
Pity the world, or else this glutton be,
To eat the world’s due, by the grave and thee.
—William Shakespeare
4
8
12
14

Sonnet 1 is one of 154 sonnets written by the English playwright and poet William Shakespeare. It is a procreation sonnet within the Fair Youth sequence.

== Introduction ==
Sonnet 1 is the first in a series of 154 sonnets written by William Shakespeare and published in 1609 by Thomas Thorpe. Nineteenth-century critics thought Thorpe might have published the poems without Shakespeare's consent, but modern scholars don't agree and consider that Thorpe maintained a good reputation. Sonnet 1 is the first of the "Fair Youth" sonnets, in which an unnamed young man is being addressed by the speaker. Patrick Cheney comments on this: "Beginning with a putatively male speaker imploring a beautiful young man to reproduce, and concluding with a series of poems – the dark lady poems – that affiliate consummated heterosexual passion with incurable disease, Shakespeare's Sonnets radically and deliberately disrupt the conventional narrative of erotic courtship". Sonnet 1 serves as being a kind of introduction to the rest of the sonnets, and may have been written later than the ones that follow. The "procreation sonnets" (sonnets 1 – 17) urge this youth to not waste his beauty by failing to marry or reproduce. Joseph Pequigney notes: "the opening movement give[s the] expression to one compelling case... The first mode of preservation entertained is procreation, which is urged without letup in the first fourteen poems and twice again".

The identity of the "Fair Youth" is not known; two leading candidates are considered the “W.H.” mentioned in the dedication of the 1609 quarto: "Henry Wriothesley, third earl of Southampton (1573–1624), or William Herbert, third earl of Pembroke (1580–1630)". Both were patrons of Shakespeare but at different times – Wriothesley in the 1590s and Herbert in the 1600s. Though the idea that the Fair Youth and the W.H. are the same person has often been doubted, the Fair Youth may be based on one person in the first 17 sonnets and based on another person in the rest.

See: Identity of "Mr. W.H."

In Sonnet 1 the speaker engages in an argument with the youth regarding procreation. Scholar Helen Vendler sums up Sonnet 1: "The different rhetorical moments of this sonnet (generalizing reflection, reproach, injunction, prophecy) are permeable to one another's metaphors, so that the rose of philosophical reflection yields the bud of direct address, and the famine of address yields the glutton who, in epigram, eats the world's due".

== Context ==
Shakespeare's sonnets do not exactly follow the sonnet form established by the Italian poet Petrarch. According to Robert Matz, "Shakespeare transforms the sonnet convention". Shakespeare brings in topics and themes that were unusual at the time. Shakespeare's audience would have interpreted such an aggressive tone as entirely improper encouragement of procreation. In fact, the other sonnets of the time revered chastity. However, Shakespeare "does not engage in stock exaltation of the chastity of the beloved, but instead accuses the young man of gluttonous self-consumption in his refusal to produce a 'tender heir' who would continue his beauty beyond the inexorable decay of aging". Sonnets are often about romantic love between the speaker and the beloved but Shakespeare does not do this. Instead, Shakespeare urges the young man to have sex and procreate with a woman in marriage.

=== Context for Sonnet 1 ===
This sonnet is the first one of the collection of sonnets published in the 1609 quarto. According to Helen Vendler, this sonnet can be “as an index to the rest of the sonnets", mainly because it brings "into play such a plethora of conceptual material; it seems a self-conscious groundwork laid for the rest". Vendler says that because of the "sheer abundance of values, images, and concepts important in the sequence which are called into play" and "the number of significant words brought to our attention" in this sonnet, that it may have been composed late in the writing process, and then placed first "as a 'preface' to the others". Philip Martin says that Sonnet 1 is important to the rest because it "states the themes for the sonnets immediately following and also for the sequence at large". To him, the themes are announced in this sonnet and the later ones develop those themes. Joseph Pequigney says that Sonnet 1 may be "a befitting way to begin the least conventional of Renaissance love-sonnet sequences". It provides a "production of metaphorical motifs that will recur in the upcoming sonnets, particularly in the next fourteen or so; it gives the concepts of beauty and time and their interrelationship, as also the emblem of the rose, all of which carry the weight in the other sonnets; and it shows the theme of reproduction, to be taken up in all except one of the sixteen ensuing poems".

Donald A. Stauffer says that the sonnets "may not be in an order which is absolutely correct but no one can deny that they are related and that they do show some development some 'story' even if incomplete and unsatisfactory".

== Form and structure ==
Sonnet 1 has the traditional characteristics of a Shakespearean sonnet—three quatrains and a couplet written in iambic pentameter with an ABAB CDCD EFEF GG rhyme scheme. Many of Shakespeare's sonnets also reflect the two-part structure of the Italian Petrarchan Sonnet. In this type of sonnet (though not in Sonnet 1) "the first eight lines are logically or metaphorically set against the last six [and] an octave-generalization will be followed by a particular sestet-application, an octave question will be followed by a sestet answer or at least a quatrain answer before the summarizing couplet".

In lines one through four of this sonnet, Shakespeare writes about increasing and references memory. Here, Shakespeare chooses to rhyme "increase" and "decease", "die" and "memory" and then proceeds to use "eyes" and "lies", "fuel" and "cruel" as rhymes in the second quatrain (lines five through eight). In lines five through twelve, Shakespeare shifts to famine and waste. Carl Atkins highlights Shakespeare's inventiveness in the second quatrain, where the sonnet takes on a less-regular rhythm: "We note Shakespeare's consummate ability to mimic colloquial speech so that the sonnet sounds personal and conversational, rather than sententious. Rhythm has an important role here. Thus, we have the triple emphasis produced by the final spondee of line 5, so effective after the regular iambic pentameter of all that precedes it. This is then followed by the flowing trochee-iamb that begins the next line, a combination that will be repeated frequently".

In the third quatrain, the key rhyming words given by the speaker are: "ornament" and "content", and "spring" and "niggarding"; additional images are presented in this quatrain, such as "fresh", "herald", "bud", "burial", and the oxymoron "tender churl". Other words and themes the speaker uses are explained by Helen Vendler: "The concepts – because Shakespeare's mind works by contrastive taxonomy – tend to be summoned in pairs: increase and decrease, ripening and dying; beauty and immortality versus memory and inheritance; expansion and contraction; inner spirit (eyes) and outward show (bud); self-consumption and dispersal, famine and abundance". Shakespeare uses these words to make "an aesthetic investment in profusion".

The sonnet ends with a couplet: two consecutive rhyming lines. Each line contains ten syllables, and the second line is composed only of one-syllable words. Some scholars attribute the monosyllable closing line of the poem as a tribute to 16th century poet, George Gascoigne. Gascoigne is quoted as saying, "The more monosyllables that you use, the truer Englishman you shall seemed, and the less you shall smell of the Inkhorn".

It is in this final quatrain and the concluding couplet we see one final change. The couplet of the poem describes the seemingly selfish nature of the beloved (Shakespeare chooses to rhyme "be" and "thee" here). By making the choice to not procreate, Shakespeare describes how the beloved is denying what the world deserves (his bloodline). Instead of ending the sonnet on a positive note or feeling while alternating between dark and bright tones, the tone of the couplet is negative since the sonnet is overshadowed by the themes of blame, self-interest, and famine in both quatrains two and three.

The first line illustrates a regular iambic pentameter, and the seventh illustrates a variation: an initial reversal.

  ×   /  ×     /  ×     /  × /   ×   /
From fairest creatures we desire increase, (1.1)

 / ×   ×  / ×     /   × /  ×     /
Making a famine where abundance lies, (1.7)

/ = ictus, a metrically strong syllabic position. × = nonictus.

== Analysis ==
Helen Vendler comments on the overall significance of this sonnet: "When God saw his creatures, he commanded them to increase and multiply. Shakespeare, in this first sonnet of the sequence, suggests we have internalized the paradisal command in an aestheticized form: From fairest creatures we desire increase. The sonnet begins, so to speak, in the desire for an Eden where beauty’s rose will never die; but the fall quickly arrives with decease. Unless the young man pities the world, and consents to his own increase, even a successively self-renewing Eden is unavailable". Kenneth Larsen notes that Shakespeare does not begin his sequence with a customary dedicatory sonnet. Larsen also claims that the sonnet's first line echoes Genesis, the "locus biblicus of openings". The expectation recalls God's command, “bring ye forth fruite & multiplie: grow plentifully in the earth, and increase therein” (9.10; GV).

=== Quatrain 1 ===
Shakespeare begins Sonnet 1 with a reference to the physical beauty of “fairest creatures”, then challenges the young man's lack of a desire for an heir. According to Robert Matz, "Sonnet 1 is so far from the romantic desires we usually associate with sonnets that no woman is even mentioned in it... But while there is no woman in this sonnet it is not the case that there is no desire. On the contrary, Shakespeare continually expresses his desire for the young man whom he calls 'beauty's rose' and who, he warns, must like a rose reproduce himself". The allusion to the rose is a particularly significant because it was uncommon for the rose, a symbol for femininity, to be used to refer to a man. At the end of the first quatrain, Shakespeare's pun on the word "tender" (to mean both the obvious meaning of youth and beauty and the less obvious sense of currency to alleviate a debt) further illustrates the beloved's need to reproduce in order to pay off his debt of chastity. The phrase “tender heir” of line 4 contains a pun as it alludes to the false etymology of the Latin word mulier (wife), from mollis aer (soft air), giving the phrase a double meaning: not only that a child will preserve his memory, but that his wife will bear that child. This pun is repeated in Shakespeare's play Cymbeline, where the etymology is discussed.

=== Quatrain 2 ===
In the second quatrain, the speaker says that the young man is not only betrothed to himself, but is also eating away at himself and will leave famine behind where there is abundance, thus making the young man's cruel self an enemy of his “sweet self”. Line five, "But thou, contracted to thine own bright eyes", suggests the young man is pledged to himself, as in a betrothal, but reduced to the small scope of his own eyes. Shakespeare then goes on to give the imagery of a candle eating itself, "Feed'st thy light's flame with self-substantial fuel", which can be tied to gluttony in the thirteenth line. In the last two lines of the second quatrain, "Making a famine where abundance lies, Thy self thy foe, to thy sweet self too cruel", Shakespeare uses the contrasting images of "famine" and "abundance" and then "sweet self" and "cruel" to describe the selfishness of the young man.

=== Quatrain 3 ===
“Thou that art now the world’s fresh ornament/And only herald to the gaudy spring” might suggest that the young man has potential as a courtier, as in Shakespeare's play Richard II, when a mother asks her son with the same understanding, “Who are the violets now/That strew the green lap of the new-come spring?” The word “gaudy” suggests richness, but not the modern meaning of “vulgar excess”. The word “only” means “supreme”, as it is also used in the dedication of the quarto (the “only begetter”). "Within thine own bud buriest thy content", suggests the youth keeps his beauty and life to himself, instead of letting the world see it in bloom. The word "buriest" suggests the youth digging his own grave. According to Philip J.T. Martin, in this line "content" means "'all that he contains', which of course includes the power to beget children, and at the same time it means his 'contentment', now and more especially in the future, and the contentment which he could give to others". In the next line, "and, tender churl, mak'st waste in niggarding", the speaker uses the paradox of the tender churl that makes waste in niggarding as the beginning of the turning point for the sonnet. Helen Vendler considers that quatrain three is used as a "delay in wonder and admiration" of the youth by the speaker. Philip Martin describes the third quatrain as a "tone of self-love, as the poet sees it in the youth" and it is "not praise alone, nor blame alone; not one and then the other; but both at once".

=== Couplet ===
Shakespeare contrasts the allusions to famine in the second quatrain with an allusion of gluttony by saying that the young man is "eat[ing] the world's due" if he were to die without offspring. The rhythmic structure of the couplet (particularly "by the grave and thee") suggests Shakespeare's "consummate ability to mimic colloquial speech so that the sonnet sounds personal and conversational, rather than sententious", and that upon first reading, one may be granted the ability to absorb more of the author's message as opposed to a close contextual reading.
