= The Rape of Lucrece =

Poem by William Shakespeare

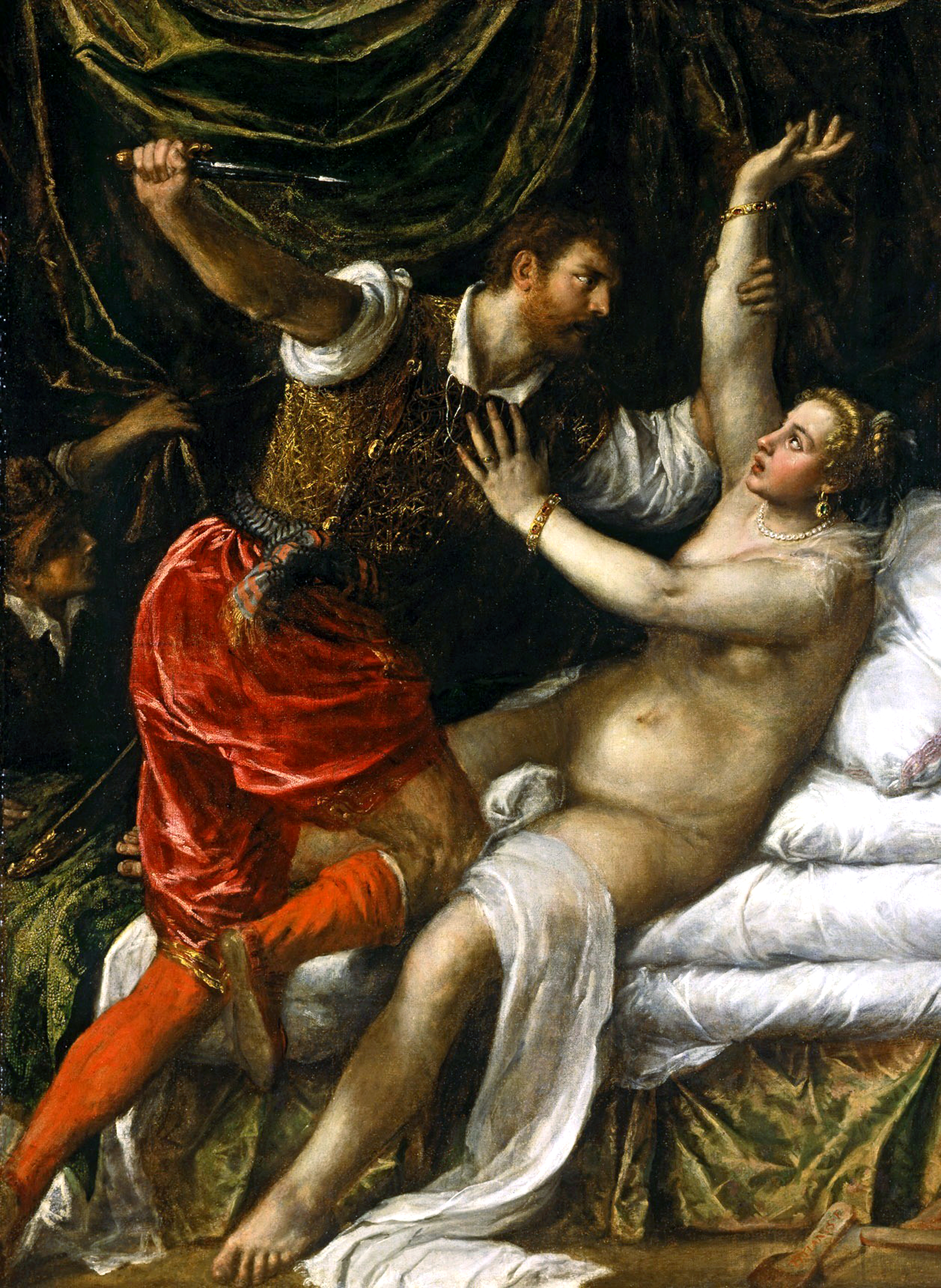
Tarquin and Lucretia by Titian

The Rape of Lucrece (1594) is a narrative poem by William Shakespeare about the legendary Roman noblewoman Lucretia. In his previous narrative poem, Venus and Adonis (1593), Shakespeare had included a dedicatory letter to his patron, the Earl of Southampton, in which he promised to compose a "graver labour". Accordingly, The Rape of Lucrece has a serious tone throughout.

The poem begins with a prose dedication addressed directly to the Earl of Southampton, which begins, "The love I dedicate to your Lordship is without end." It refers to the poem as a pamphlet, which describes the form of its original publication of 1594.

The dedication is followed by "The Argument", a prose paragraph that summarizes the historical context of the poem, which begins in medias res.

The poem contains 1,855 lines, divided into 265 stanzas of seven lines each. The meter of each line is iambic pentameter. The rhyme scheme for each stanza is ABABBCC, a format known as "rhyme royal", which was used by Geoffrey Chaucer before Shakespeare and by John Milton and John Masefield after him.

== Setting ==
The poem is set just before the establishment of the Roman Republic in 509 BC. The poem's locations are Rome, Ardea, twenty-four miles south of Rome, and Collatium, ten miles east of Rome.

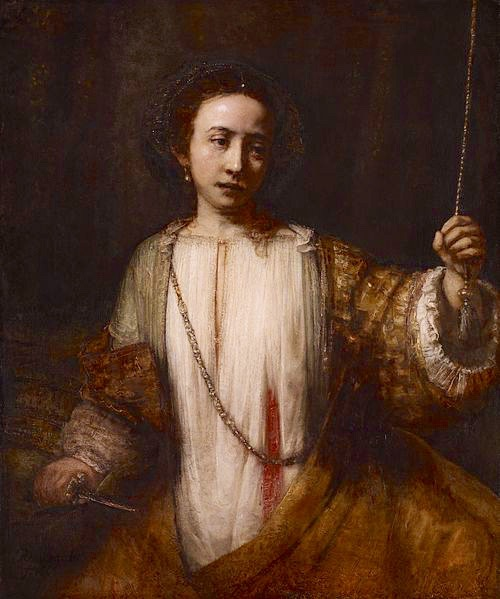
Lucretia, Rembrandt, 1666

== Characters ==
- Lucrece – An honorable woman
- Collatine – Lucrece's husband, an officer in the Roman army
- Tarquin (Sextus Tarquinius) – Son of king Lucius Tarquinius and an officer in the Roman army, who rapes Lucrece
- Lucretius – Lucrece's father
- Junius Brutus – Friend to Collatine and Lucretius
- A Messenger
- Lucius Tarquinius (Tarquin the Proud) – King of Rome and Tarquin's father
- Servius Tullius – Father-in-law of Lucius Tarquinius
- Publius Valerius – Friend of Collatine and Lucretius

== Synopsis ==
One evening, in the town of Ardea, where a battle is being fought, two leading Roman soldiers, Tarquin and Collatine, are talking. Collatine describes his wife, Lucrece, in glowing terms—she is beautiful and chaste. The following morning, Tarquin travels to Collatine's home. Lucrece welcomes him. Tarquin entertains her with stories of her husband's deeds on the battlefield.

Tarquin spends the night at Collatine's house, and is torn by his desire for Lucrece. His desire overcomes him, and he goes to Lucrece's chamber, where she is asleep. He reaches out and touches her breast, which wakes her up. She is afraid. He tells her that she must give in to him, or else he will kill her. He also threatens to cause her dishonor by murdering a slave and placing the two bodies in each other's arms, and then he would claim that he killed her because he discovered them in this embrace. If she would give in to him, Tarquin promises to keep it all secret. Lucrece pleads with him to no avail. He rapes her.

Full of shame and guilt, Tarquin sneaks away. Lucrece is devastated, furious and suicidal. She writes a letter to her husband, asking him to come home. When Collatine gets home, Lucrece tells him the whole story, but does not say who did it. Collatine demands to know. Before she tells him, Lucrece gets the soldiers, who are also there, to promise to avenge this crime. She then tells her husband who did it, and she immediately pulls out a knife, stabs herself and dies. Collatine's grief is so great that he wants to kill himself, as well. His friend, Brutus, suggests that revenge is a better choice. The soldiers carry Lucrece's body through the streets of Rome. The citizens, angered, banish Tarquin and his family bringing Republic rule back to Rome.

== Publication and title ==
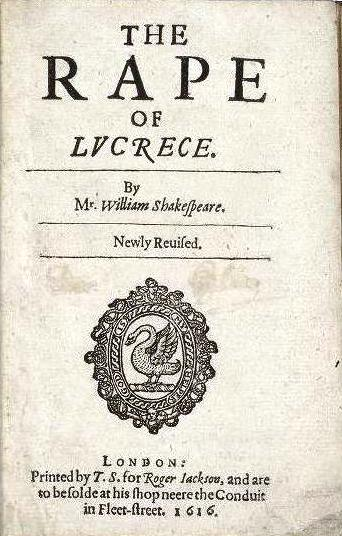
Title page of the sixth edition of The Rape of Lucrece (1616).

The Rape of Lucrece was entered into the Stationers' Register on 9 May 1594, and published later that year, in a quarto printed by Richard Field for the bookseller John Harrison ("the Elder"); Harrison sold the book from his shop at the sign of the White Greyhound in St. Paul's Churchyard. The title given on the title page was simply Lucrece, though the running title throughout the volume, as well as the heading at the beginning of the text is The Rape of Lucrece. Harrison's copyright was transferred to Roger Jackson in 1614; Jackson issued a sixth edition (O5) in 1616. Other octavo editions followed in 1624, 1632 and 1655. The poem went through eight editions before 1641.

== Historical background ==
The Rape of Lucrece draws on the story described in both Ovid's Fasti and Livy's History of Rome. Both authors were writing a few centuries after the events occurred, and their histories are not accepted as strictly accurate, partly because Roman records were destroyed by the Gauls in 390 BC, and the histories prior to that have been mixed with legends.

The Roman king was Lucius Tarquinius, or Tarquin. Because of his arrogance and his tyranny, he is also known as Tarquinius Superbus (Tarquin the Proud). Lucius Tarquinius had killed his brother-in-law and father to become king of Rome. His son, Sextus Tarquinius, heir to the throne, is the rapist of the story. At the beginning of the poem the Roman army is waging war on a tribe known as the Volscians, who had claimed territory south of Rome. The Romans are laying siege to Ardea, a Volscian city 20 miles south of Rome.

In 509 BC, Sextus Tarquinius, son of the king of Rome, raped Lucretia (Lucrece), wife of Collatinus, one of the king's aristocratic retainers. As a result, Lucrece committed suicide. Her body was paraded in the Roman Forum by the king's nephew. This incited a full-scale revolt against the Tarquins led by Lucius Junius Brutus, the banishment of the royal family, and the founding of the Roman Republic.

== Allusions to Lucretia in other works by Shakespeare ==
=== Titus Andronicus ===
The Rape of Lucrece is also closely related to the early Roman tragedy Titus Andronicus (c. 1590–1594). In this revenge play, when the raped and mutilated Lavinia reveals the identity of her rapists, her uncle Marcus invokes the story of Lucrece to urge an oath to revenge the crime: "And swear with me—as, with the woeful fere / And father of that chaste dishonoured dame, / Lord Junius Brutus swore for Lucrece' rape— / That we will prosecute by good advice / Mortal revenge upon these traitorous Goths, / And see their blood, or die with this reproach" (4.1.89–94).

=== The Taming of the Shrew ===
In The Taming of the Shrew Act 2, Scene 1, Petruchio promises Baptista, the father of Katherine (the Shrew), that once he marries Katherine "for patience she will prove second Grisel, / And Roman Lucrece for her chastity" (2.1.284–285).

=== Twelfth Night ===
In Twelfth Night, Maria's letter in Olivia's handwriting designed to gull Malvolio reads: "I may command where I adore; but silence, like a Lucrece knife, With bloodless stroke my heart doth gore: M, O, A, I, doth sway my life." As Malvolio interprets the "fustian riddle", Olivia's inability or unwillingness to speak of her love for him is killing her, like the literal knife of Lucretia's suicide. Malvolio also notes that Olivia uses an image of Lucrece as a personal seal, and it is this that convinces him the letter is from Olivia.

=== Macbeth ===
The rapist Tarquin is also mentioned in Macbeth's soliloquy from Act 2 Scene 1 of Macbeth: "wither'd Murther ... With Tarquin's ravishing strides, towards his design / Moves like a ghost" (2.1.52–56). Tarquin's actions and cunning are compared with Macbeth's indecision—both rape and regicide are unforgivable crimes.

=== Cymbeline ===
Shakespeare retains the essence of the classic story, incorporating Livy's account that Tarquin's lust for Lucrece sprang from her husband's own praise of her. Shakespeare later used the same idea in the late romance Cymbeline (c. 1609–10). In this play, Iachimo bets Posthumus (Imogen's husband) that he can make Imogen commit adultery with him. He does not succeed. However, Iachimo convinces Posthumus otherwise using information about Imogen's bedchamber and body. Iachimo hid in a trunk which was delivered to Imogen's chamber under the pretence of safekeeping some jewels, a gift for her father, King Cymbeline. The scene in which he emerges from the trunk (2.2) mimics the scene in The Rape of Lucrece. Iachimo compares himself to Tarquin in the scene: "Our Tarquin thus, / Did softly press the rushes ere he waken'd / The chastity he wounded" (2.2.12–14).

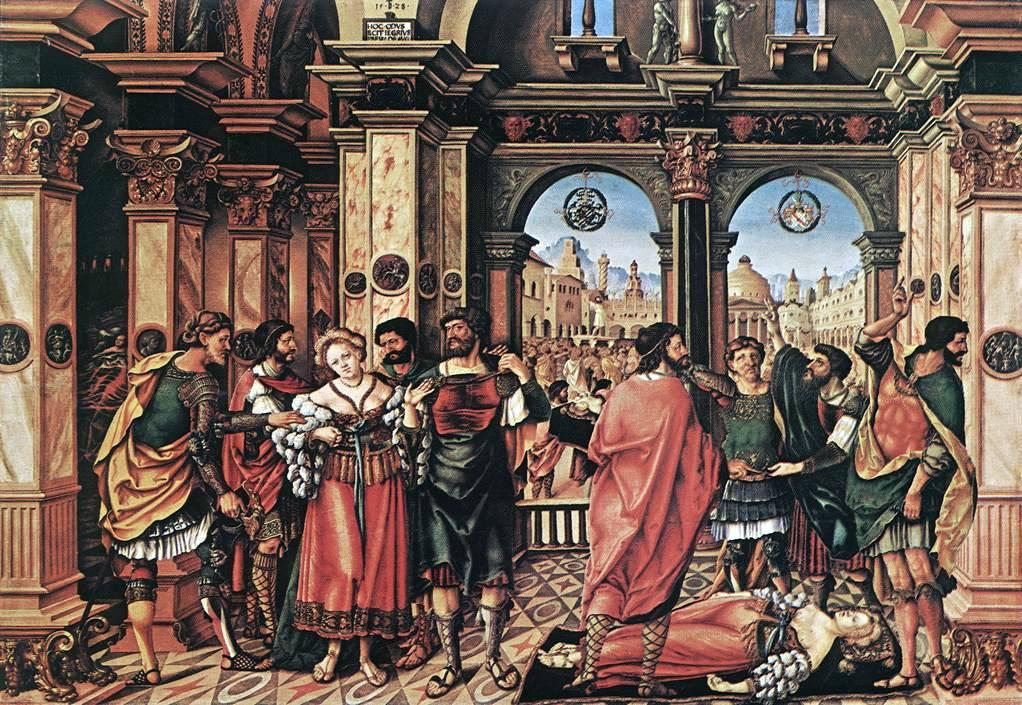
The suicide of Lucretia, by Jörg Breu the Elder

== Analysis and criticism ==
The Rape of Lucrece, one of Shakespeare's earliest works, was published one year after Venus and Adonis. It is seen as a tragic narrative poem, that is extremely rich in poetic images, fancies, and metaphors. It tells a moralistic tale of a bad deed, what caused it, how it occurred, and the tragic result.

In a post-structuralist analysis of the poem, Joel Fineman argues that The Rape of Lucrece, like Shakespeare's sonnets, deconstructs the traditional poetics of praise. Fineman observes that the tragic events of the poem are set in motion precisely by Collatine's hyperbolic praise of Lucrece; it is his "boast of Lucrece' sov'reignty" (29) that kindles Tarquin's profane desire. It is not the fact of Lucrece's chastity, but rather the fact that her husband praises her with the "name of 'chaste'" that inspires Tarquin's crime: "Haply, that name of 'chaste' unhapp'ly set / This bateless edge on his keen appetite" (8–9). Collatine's praise paradoxically creates the circumstances that will ruin both the woman that he praises and the integrity of the rhetoric of praise itself. Furthermore, the poem itself draws attention to its own complicity in Collatine's fatal rhetoric of praise: "the poem itself performs or activates this same praising word of which it speaks" by citing, in the first line of the second stanza, its own use of "chaste" in the last line of the first stanza: "Collatine's fair love, Lucrece the chaste" (7). To Fineman, the poem's initial self-citation is just one example of how the "poem's own rhetoricity is... performatively implicated in the rape it reports". In other words, the opening of the poem highlights an intrinsic link between the language of poetic praise and sexual violence. In these same opening stanzas, The Rape of Lucrece also acknowledges how its own poetic rhetoric is part of this larger literary tradition which yokes praise and violence.

Jane Newman's feminist analysis of the poem focuses on its relationship to the myth of Philomel and Procne from Book VI of the Metamorphoses by Ovid. In Newman's reading, the tradition of violent female revenge for rape represented by the myth of Philomel is repressed in Shakespeare's The Rape of Lucrece. Shakespeare's poem faintly alludes to Ovid's myth, but does not present Procne and Philomel's method of revenge as an authentic option for Lucrece. Although Lucrece maintains the ability to speak after the rape (in contrast to the mutilated Philomel who loses all speech), Newman argues that the poem actually limits Lucrece's ability to act precisely by celebrating her self-sacrifice: "The apparent contrast of a silent Philomela, robbed of the potential for such an impact on the political moment to which she belongs, effectively casts Lucretia's suicide as the only form of political intervention available to women." Ironically, Lucrece's rhetorical eloquence blocks the possibility that she herself could seek out a more active, violent retribution on Tarquin, her rapist, and the monarchical regime that he represents. Instead, her revenge must be carried out by male agents acting in her name, particularly Brutus, the founder of the Roman Republic, who imitates Lucrece's self-sacrificing rhetoric as he leads the rebellion against Tarquin's father, the king of Rome.

== See also ==
- 1594 in poetry
- A Lover's Complaint
