= John Benson (publisher) =

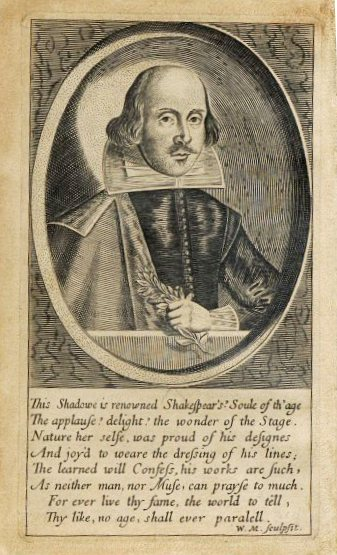
The frontispiece to Benson's edition of Shakespeare's poems

John Benson (died 23 January 1667) was a London publisher of the middle seventeenth century, best remembered for a historically important publication of the Sonnets and miscellaneous poems of William Shakespeare in 1640.

John Benson began his career as a stationer in 1635; he maintained shops in Chancery Lane (from 1635 on) and St. Dunstan's Churchyard in Fleet Street (1640 and after). In his publishing career, Benson generally concentrated on the lower end of the market for printed matter in his era; he "specialized in the publication of ballads and broadsides." Yet he published books too, like Joseph Rutter's The Shepherds' Holy-Day (1635); he issued Ben Jonson's Execration Against Vulcan in 1640.

Benson partnered with other stationers for some projects. He joined with fellow stationer John Waterson to publish the first quarto of Fletcher and Massinger's The Elder Brother (1637). Benson and John Saywell issued Francis Quarles's Hosanna, or Divine poems on the Passion of Christ (1647); in 1651 Benson formed a partnership to print music books with John Playford. Their edition of John Hilton's Catch That Catch Can, a collection of "catches, rounds, and canons", appeared in 1652.

== Shakespeare's Poems, 1640 ==
Benson entered his edition of Shakespeare's poems in the Stationers' Register on 4 November 1639. (Since Thomas Thorpe, the original publisher of the Sonnets and A Lover's Complaint, had died c. 1635, his copyright to the material was likely considered lapsed.) The volume was published in octavo the following year. The title of the publication reads:

POEMS: VVRITTEN BY WIL. SHAKE-SPEARE. Gent. Printed at London by Tho. Cotes, and are to be sold by Iohn Bensen, dwelling in S^{t}. Dunstans Church yard. 1640.

The book opens with engraver William Marshall's portrait of Shakespeare – a reduced and reversed version of Martin Droeshout's engraving from the First Folio. This is followed by Benson's preface "to the Reader", commendatory poems by Leonard Digges and John Warren, and then the poems themselves. The edition combined most of Shakespeare's sonnets (numbers 18, 19, 43, 56, 75, 76, and 126 are omitted), mingled with poems from The Passionate Pilgrim (the corrupt 1612 edition), plus A Lover's Complaint, The Phoenix and the Turtle, Milton's poem to Shakespeare from the Second Folio, poems by Ben Jonson, Francis Beaumont, Robert Herrick and others, and miscellaneous pieces.

Thomas Cotes, Benson's printer for the Poems, also printed the Shakespeare Second Folio (1632), and the first quarto of The Two Noble Kinsmen (1634).

Benson is notorious for rearranging the order of the sonnets into groups, which he presented as complete poems, for which he invented titles. He also changed the pronouns in several of the sonnets to create the impression that they were written to a woman.

The "derivative and unauthoritative character" of Benson's edition was not recognized until Shakespeare scholar Edmond Malone re-directed critics' attention to the original 1609 edition of the Sonnets; "for almost a century and a half Benson's mangled hodgepodge was an accepted repository of Shakespeare's lyric verse."
