= A Lover's Complaint =

1609 poem by William Shakespeare

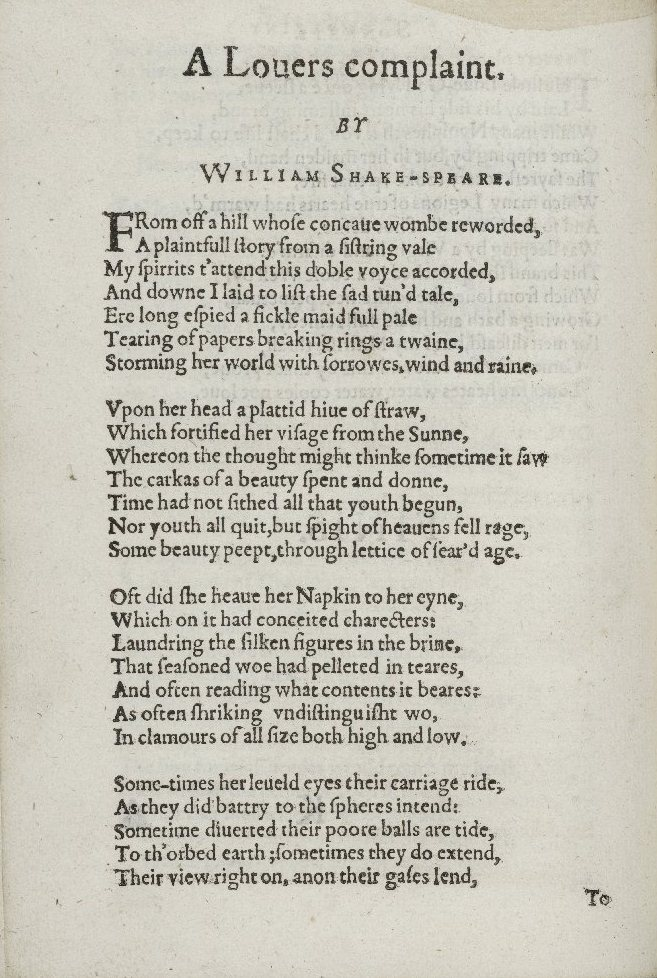
The first page of "A Lover's Complaint" from Shakespeare's Sonnets, 1609

"A Lover's Complaint" is a narrative poem written by William Shakespeare, and published as part of the 1609 quarto of Shakespeare's Sonnets. It was published by Thomas Thorpe.

"A Lover’s Complaint" is an example of the female-voiced complaint, which is frequently appended to sonnet sequences. Other examples include Samuel Daniel's "Complaint to Rosamund", which follows Daniel's Delia (1592), Thomas Lodge's "Complaint of Elstred", which follows Phillis (1593), Michael Drayton's "Matilda the Faire", which follows Ideas Mirrour (1594), and Richard Barnfield's "Cassandra", which follows Cynthia with certaine sonnets.

== Form and content ==
The poem consists of forty-seven stanzas of seven-lines each written in the form known as rhyme royal (rhyme scheme ABABBCC), a metre identical to that of Shakespeare's longer narrative poem The Rape of Lucrece.

The poem begins with a description of a young woman weeping at the edge of a river, into which she throws torn-up letters, rings, and other tokens of love. An old man nearby approaches the woman and asks the reason for her sorrow. She responds by telling him of a former lover who pursued, seduced, and finally abandoned her. She recounts in detail the speech her lover gave to her which seduced her. She concludes her story by conceding that she would fall for the young man's false charms again:

O, that infected moisture of his eye,
O, that false fire which in his cheek so glowed,
O, that forc'd thunder from his heart did fly,
O, that sad breath his spungy lungs bestowed,
O, all that borrowed motion seeming owed,
Would yet again betray the fore-betray'd,
And new pervert a reconciled maid!

== Authorship ==
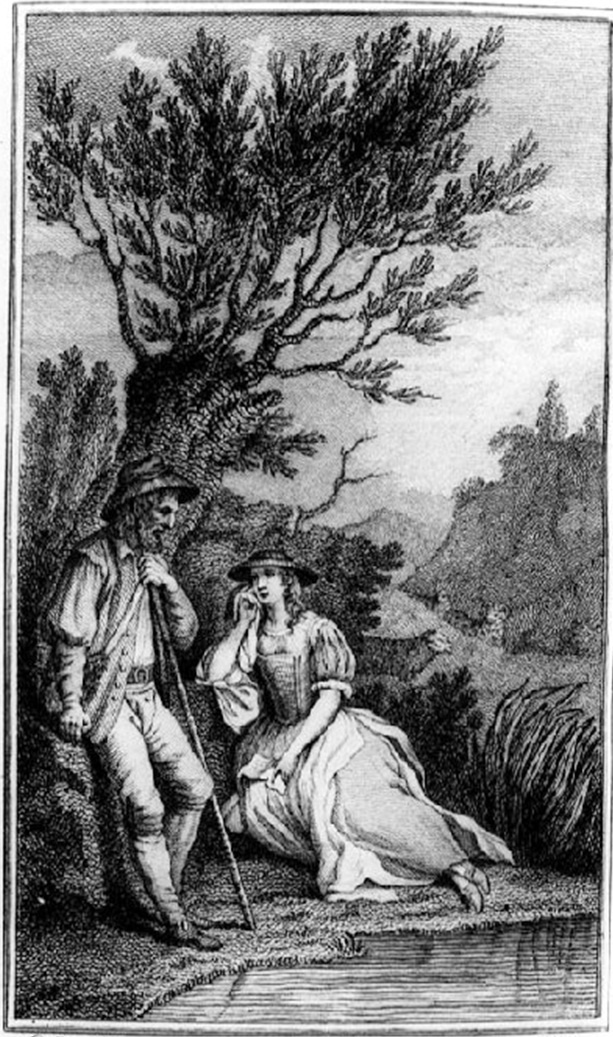
The first known illustration to "A Lover's Complaint", from John Bell's 1774 edition of Shakespeare's works

Few have questioned the authorship of the poem. Shakespeare's authorship was not questioned until the early 19th century, when Hazlitt expressed doubts. In 1917 Robertson suggested that the poem, and several plays, were written by Chapman. This idea was not widely accepted, and attributions based on general aesthetic impressions of a poem have since become less common among literary scholars. "A Lover's Complaint" contains words and forms not found elsewhere in Shakespeare, including archaisms and Latinisms. Edmond Malone called the poem "beautiful", and suggested that Shakespeare may have been trying to compete with Edmund Spenser. Critics have seen thematic parallels to situations in Shakespeare's All's Well That Ends Well and Measure for Measure. According to John Kerrigan in Motives of Woe, the poem may be regarded as an appropriate coda to the sonnets, with its narrative triangle of young woman, elderly man, and seductive suitor paralleling a similar triangle in the sonnets themselves. Stanley Wells and Paul Edmondson note that:

It was not unusual for sonnets to be followed by longer poems. Late sixteenth-century readers developed a taste for them and would not have been surprised to find complaints at the end of sonnet collections. Samuel Daniel's Delia is followed by The Complaint of Rosamund (1592), Thomas Lodge's Phillis is followed by The Complaint of Elstred (1593), Richard Barnfield's Cassandra succeeds Cynthia, with Certain Sonnets (1595).

Shakespeare is widely accepted as the poems' author. This is supported by studies written by Kenneth Muir, Eliot Slater and MacDonald P. Jackson.

=== Alternative views ===
One writer suggests that the author was an anonymous early Elizabethan poet.

In 2007 Brian Vickers, suggested the poem was written by John Davies of Hereford, an author of theological pamphlets. He details arguments for the non-Shakespearean nature of the poem and lists numerous verbal parallels between the "Complaint" and the known works of Davies: – such as 'What brest so cold that is not warmed heare' and 'What heart's so cold that is not set on fire'. On this evidence it was omitted from the 2007 RSC Complete Works. MacDonald P. Jackson, in his review of Vickers' book in the Review of English Studies, calls this omission a "mistake" and states that Vickers' evidence is "very meagre." Jackson adds:

Had Vickers keyed in "spongy", "outwardly", and "physic"—trying the various possible original spellings and selecting instances of "physic" as a verb—he would have found that in the whole of LION ["literature online" database], covering more than six centuries of English poetry, drama, and prose, four separate works contain all three words: Troilus and Cressida, Macbeth, Cymbeline, and "A Lover's Complaint".

Harold Love, in his The Times Literary Supplement review, has similar questions regarding Vickers' suggestion:

Vickers was led to Davies by the number of words from the "Complaint" he found during a computer search of the invaluable LION archive; but any such investigation is bound to favour such a voluminous author against the less prolific or minimally preserved. In similar work on Restoration poets, I continually found parallels with the verse of Ned Ward for works that it was chronologically impossible for him to have written. The reasons were that, like Davies, he wrote a vast amount of verse and that his style had a chameleonlike quality that brought it close to the poetic mean of the time.
