= Shakespeare's sonnets =

Shakespeare's Sonnets
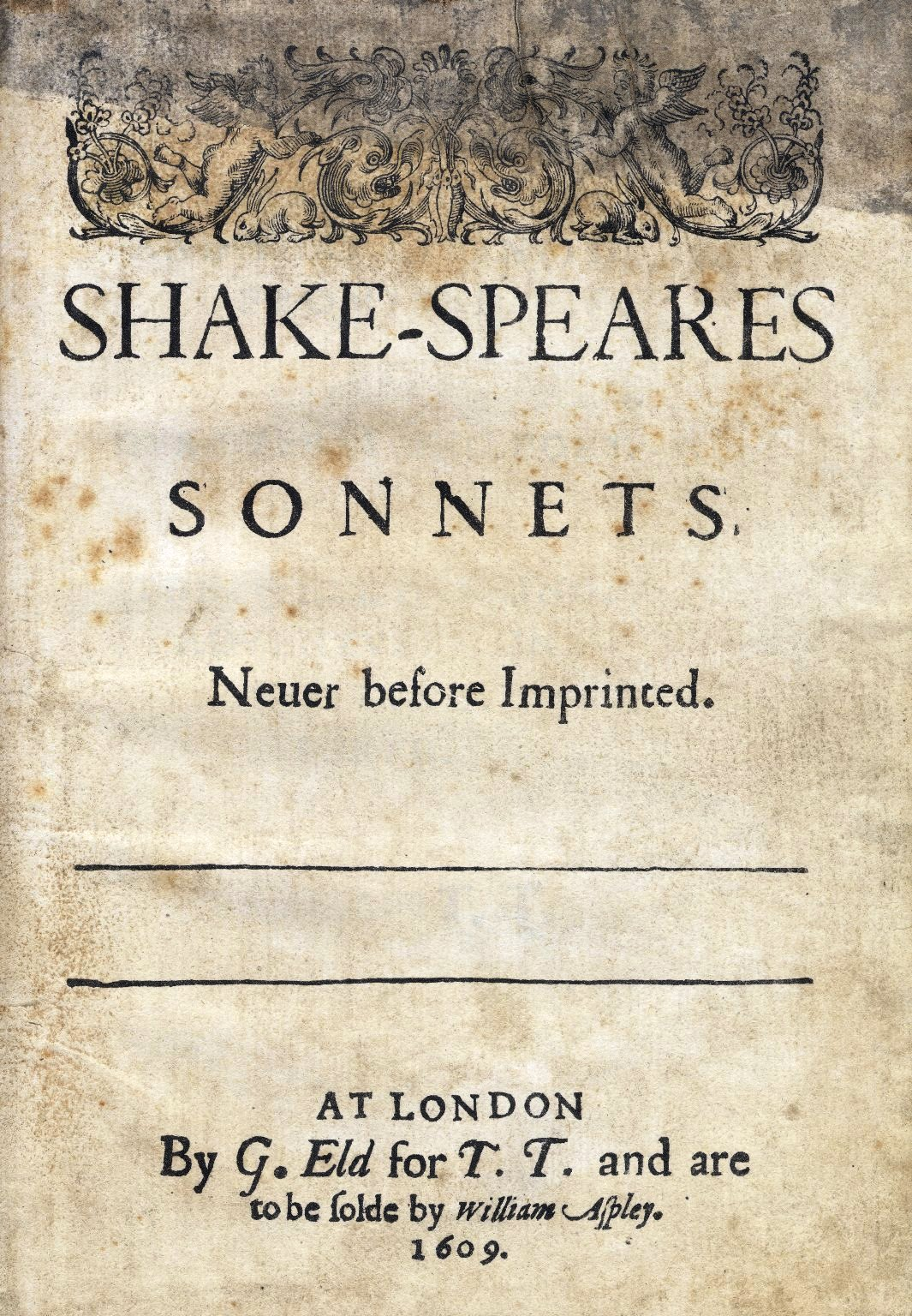
- Thomas Thorpe's edition of the sonnets (1609)
- Author: William Shakespeare
- Language: Early Modern English
- Genre: Renaissance poetry
- Publisher: Thomas Thorpe
- Publication date: 1609
- Publication place: England
- Text: Shakespeare's Sonnets at Wikisource

William Shakespeare (c. 23 April 1564 – 23 April 1616) wrote sonnets on a variety of themes. When discussing or referring to Shakespeare's sonnets, it is almost always a reference to the 154 sonnets that were first published all together in a quarto in 1609. However, there are six additional sonnets that Shakespeare wrote and included in the plays Romeo and Juliet, Henry V and Love's Labour's Lost. There is also a partial sonnet found in the play Edward III.

== Context ==
Shakespeare's sonnets are considered a continuation of the sonnet tradition that swept through the Renaissance from Petrarch in 14th-century Italy and was finally introduced in 16th-century England by Thomas Wyatt and was given its rhyming metre and division into quatrains by Henry Howard. With few exceptions, Shakespeare's sonnets observe the stylistic form of the English sonnet—the rhyme scheme, the 14 lines, and the metre. But, Shakespeare's sonnets introduce significant departures of content.

Instead of expressing worshipful love for an almost goddess-like yet unobtainable female love-object, as Petrarch, Dante, and Philip Sidney had done, Shakespeare introduces a young man. He also introduces the Dark Lady. Shakespeare explores themes such as lust, infidelity, and acrimony.

== The quarto of 1609 ==
The primary source of Shakespeare's sonnets is a quarto published in 1609 titled Shake-speare's Sonnets. It contains 154 sonnets, which are followed by the long poem "A Lover's Complaint". Thirteen copies of the quarto have survived in fairly good shape. There is evidence in a note on the title page of one of the extant copies that the great Elizabethan actor Edward Alleyn bought a copy in June 1609 for one shilling.

The sonnets cover such themes as the passage of time, love, infidelity, jealousy, beauty and mortality. The first 126 are addressed to a young man; the last 28 are either addressed to, or refer to, a woman. (Sonnets 138 and 144 had previously been published in the 1599 miscellany The Passionate Pilgrim.)

The title of the quarto, Shake-speare's Sonnets, is consistent with the entry in the Stationers' Register. The title appears in upper case lettering on the title page, where it is followed by the phrase "Neuer before Imprinted". That the author's name in a possessive form is part of the title sets it apart from all other sonnet collections of the time, except for one—Sir Philip Sidney's posthumous 1591 publication that is titled, Syr. P.S. his Astrophel and Stella, which is considered one of Shakespeare's most important models. Sidney's title may have inspired Shakespeare, particularly if the "W.H." of Shakespeare's dedication is Sidney's nephew and heir, William Herbert. The idea that the persona referred to as the speaker of Shakespeare's sonnets might be Shakespeare himself, is aggressively repudiated by scholars; however, the title of the quarto does seem to encourage that kind of speculation.

The first 17 poems, traditionally called the procreation sonnets, are addressed to the young man—urging him to marry and have children in order to immortalize his beauty by passing it to the next generation. Other sonnets express the speaker's love for the young man; brood upon loneliness, death, and the transience of life; seem to criticise the young man for preferring a rival poet; express ambiguous feelings for the speaker's mistress; and pun on the poet's name. The final two sonnets are allegorical treatments of Greek epigrams referring to the "little love-god" Cupid.

The publisher, Thomas Thorpe, entered the book in the Stationers' Register on 20 May 1609:

Tho. Thorpe. Entred for his copie under the handes of master Wilson and master Lownes Wardenes a booke called Shakespeares sonnettes vjd.

Whether Thorpe used an authorised manuscript from Shakespeare or an unauthorised copy is unknown. George Eld printed the quarto, and the run was divided between the booksellers William Aspley and John Wright.

=== Dedication ===
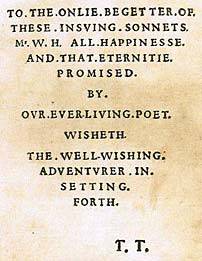
Dedication page from The Sonnets

Shakespeare's Sonnets include a dedication to "Mr. W.H.":

TO.THE.ONLIE.BEGETTER.OF.
THESE.INSUING.SONNETS.
Mr.W.H. ALL.HAPPINESSE.
AND.THAT.ETERNITIE.
PROMISED.
BY.
OUR.EVER-LIVING.POET.
WISHETH.
THE.WELL-WISHING.
ADVENTURER.IN.
SETTING.
FORTH.

T.T.

The upper case letters and the stops that follow each word of the dedication were probably intended to resemble an ancient Roman lapidary inscription or monumental brass, perhaps accentuating the declaration in Sonnet 55 that the work would confer immortality to the subjects of the work:

Not marble, nor the gilded monuments
Of princes shall outlive this pow'rful rhyme

The initials "T.T." are taken to refer to the publisher, Thomas Thorpe. Thorpe usually signed prefatory matter only if the author was out of the country or dead, which suggests that Shakespeare was not in London during the last stage of printing. However, Thorpe's entire corpus of such consists of only four dedications and three prefaces. It has been suggested that Thorpe signing the dedication, rather than the author, might indicate that Thorpe published the work without obtaining Shakespeare's permission. Though, Thorpe's taking on the dedication may be explained by the great demands of business and travel that Shakespeare was facing at this time, which may have caused him to deal with the printing production in haste before rushing out of town. After all, May 1609 was an extraordinary time: That month saw a serious outbreak of the plague, which shut down the theatres, and also caused many to flee London. Plus Shakespeare's theatre company was on tour from Ipswich to Oxford. In addition, Shakespeare had been away from Stratford and in the same month, May, was being called on to tend to family and business there, and deal with the litigation of a lawsuit in Warwickshire that involved a substantial amount of money.

==== Mr. W. H., the dedicatee ====
The identity of Mr. W.H., "the only begetter of Shakespeare's Sonnets", is not known for certain. His identity has been the subject of a great amount of speculation: that he was the author's patron, that he was both patron and the "faire youth" who is addressed in the sonnets, that the "faire youth" is based on Mr. W.H. in some sonnets but not others, and a number of other ideas.

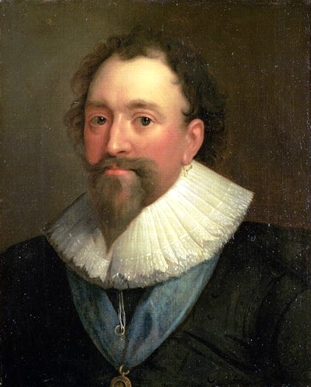
William Herbert, 3rd Earl of Pembroke

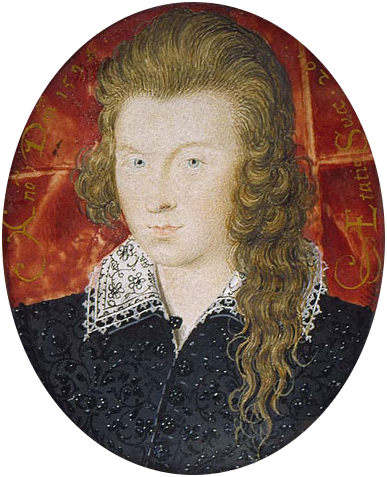
Henry Wriothesley, 3rd Earl of Southampton

William Herbert, the Earl of Pembroke, is seen as perhaps the most likely identity of Mr. W.H. and the "young man". He was the dedicatee of the First Folio. Thorpe would have been unlikely to have addressed a lord as "Mr", but there may be an explanation: perhaps that form of address came from the author, who wanted to refer to Herbert at an earlier time—when Herbert was a "younger man". There is a later dedication to Herbert in another quarto of verse, Ben Jonson's Epigrammes (1616), in which the text of Jonson's dedication begins, "MY LORD, While you cannot change your merit, I dare not change your title … " Jonson's emphasis on Pembroke's title, and his comment, seem to be chiding someone else who had the audacity to use the wrong title, as perhaps is the case in Shakespeare's dedication.

Henry Wriothesley (the Earl of Southampton), with initials reversed, has received a great deal of consideration as a likely possibility. He was the dedicatee of Shakespeare's poems Venus and Adonis and The Rape of Lucrece. Southampton was also known for his good looks.

Other suggestions include:

- A simple printing error for Shakespeare's initials, "W.S." or "W. Sh". This was suggested by Bertrand Russell, Jonathan Bate, and Donald W. Foster.
- William Hall, a printer who had worked with Thorpe. It is noted that "ALL" following "MR. W. H." spells "MR. W. HALL". Using his initials W.H., Hall had edited a collection of the poems of Robert Southwell that was printed by George Eld, the printer of the 1609 Sonnets.
- Sir William Harvey, Southampton's stepfather.
- William Haughton, a contemporary dramatist.
- William Hart, Shakespeare's nephew and male heir.
- Who He. It has been argued that the dedication is deliberately ambiguous, possibly standing for "Who He", a conceit also used in a contemporary pamphlet. It might have been created by Thorpe to encourage speculation and discussion (and hence, sales).
- Willie Hughes. The 18th-century scholar Thomas Tyrwhitt proposed "William Hughes", based on puns on the name in the sonnets (notably Sonnet 20). This idea is expressed in Oscar Wilde's short story "The Portrait of Mr. W. H.", and that the sonnets were written to a young actor who played female roles in Shakespeare's plays.

=== Form and structure of the sonnets ===
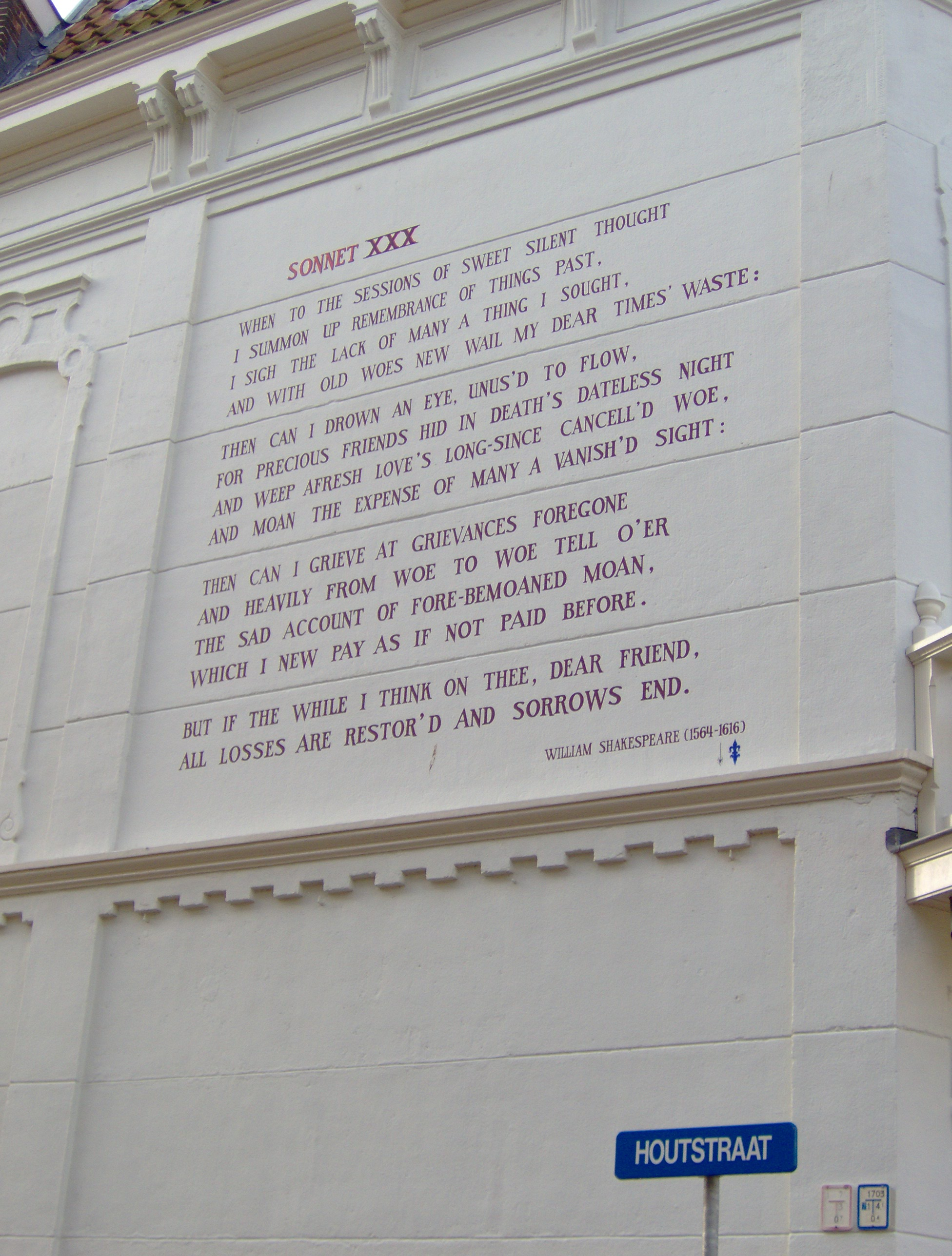
Sonnet 30 as a wall poem in Leiden

The sonnets are almost all constructed using three quatrains (four-line stanzas) followed by a final couplet. The sonnets are composed in iambic pentameter, the metre used in Shakespeare's plays.

The rhyme scheme is ABAB CDCD EFEF GG. Sonnets using this scheme are known as Shakespearean sonnets, or English sonnets, or Elizabethan sonnets. Often, at the end of the third quatrain occurs the volta ("turn"), where the mood of the poem shifts, and the poet expresses a turn of thought.

The exceptions are sonnets 99, 126, and 145. Number 99 has fifteen lines. Number 126 consists of six couplets, and two blank lines marked with italic brackets; 145 is in iambic tetrameters, not pentameters. In one other variation on the standard structure, found for example in sonnet 29, the rhyme scheme is changed by repeating the second (B) rhyme of quatrain one as the second (F) rhyme of quatrain three.

Apart from rhyme, and considering only the arrangement of ideas, and the placement of the volta, a number of sonnets maintain the two-part organization of the Italian sonnet. In that case the term "octave" and "sestet" are commonly used to refer to the sonnet's first eight lines followed by the remaining six lines. There are other line-groupings as well, as Shakespeare finds inventive ways with the content of the fourteen-line poems.

=== Characters of the sonnets ===
When analysed as characters, the subjects of the sonnets are usually referred to as the Fair Youth, the Rival Poet, and the Dark Lady. The speaker expresses admiration for the Fair Youth's beauty, and—if reading the sonnets in chronological order as published—later has an affair with the Dark Lady, then so does the Fair Youth. Current linguistic analysis and historical evidence suggests, however, that the sonnets to the Dark Lady were composed first (around 1591–95), the procreation sonnets next, and the later sonnets to the Fair Youth last (1597–1603). It is not known whether the poems and their characters are fiction or autobiographical; scholars who find the sonnets to be autobiographical have attempted to identify the characters with historical individuals.

==== Fair Youth ====
The "Fair Youth" is the unnamed young man addressed by the poet in Sonnets 1–126. The young man is handsome, self-centred, universally admired and much sought after. The sequence begins with the poet urging the young man to marry and father children (sonnets 1–17). It continues with the friendship developing with the poet's loving admiration, which at times is homoerotic in nature. Then comes a set of betrayals by the young man, as he is seduced by the Dark Lady, and they maintain a liaison (sonnets 133, 134 & 144), all of which the poet struggles to abide. It concludes with the poet's own act of betrayal, resulting in his independence from the fair youth (sonnet 152).

The identity of the Fair Youth has been the subject of speculation among scholars. One popular theory is that he was Henry Wriothesley, the 3rd Earl of Southampton; this is based in part on the idea that his physical features, age, and personality might fairly match the young man in the sonnets. He was both an admirer and patron of Shakespeare and was considered one of the most prominent nobles of the period. It is also noted that Shakespeare's 1593 poem Venus and Adonis is dedicated to Southampton and, in that poem a young man, Adonis, is encouraged by the goddess of love, Venus, to beget a child, which is a theme in the sonnets. Here are the verses from Venus and Adonis:

Torches are made to light, jewels to wear,
Dainties to taste, fresh beauty for the use,
Herbs for their smell, and sappy plants to bear;
Things growing to themselves are growth's abuse,
Seeds spring from seeds, and beauty breedeth beauty;
Thou wast begot; to get it is thy duty.

Upon the earth's increase why shouldst thou feed,
Unless the earth with thy increase be fed?
By law of nature thou art bound to breed,
That thine may live when thou thyself art dead;
And so in spite of death thou dost survive,
In that thy likeness still is left alive.

A problem with identifying the fair youth with Southampton is that the most certainly datable events referred to in the Sonnets are the Essex Rebellion and then the Gunpowder Plotters' executions in 1606, which puts Southampton at the age of 33, and then 39 when the sonnets were published, when he would be past the age when he would be referred to as a "lovely boy" or "fair youth".

Authors such as Thomas Tyrwhitt and Oscar Wilde proposed that the Fair Youth was William "Willie" Hughes, a seductive young actor who played female roles in Shakespeare's plays. Particularly, Wilde claimed that Hughes was the Mr. W.H. referred to in the dedication attached to the manuscript of the Sonnets.

==== The Dark Lady ====
The Dark Lady sequence (sonnets 127–152) is the most defiant of the sonnet tradition. The sequence distinguishes itself from the Fair Youth sequence with its overt sexuality (Sonnet 151). The Dark Lady is so called because she has black hair and "dun" skin. The Dark Lady suddenly appears (Sonnet 127), and she and the speaker of the sonnets, the poet, are in a sexual relationship. She is not aristocratic, young, beautiful, intelligent or chaste. Her complexion is muddy, her breath "reeks", and she is ungainly when she walks. The relationship strongly parallels Touchstone's pursuit of Audrey in As You Like It. The Dark Lady presents an adequate receptor for male desire. She is celebrated in cocky terms that would be offensive to her, not that she would be able to read or understand what is said. Soon the speaker rebukes her for enslaving his fair friend (sonnet 133). He can't abide the triangular relationship, and it ends with him rejecting her. As with the Fair Youth, there have been many attempts to identify her with a real historical individual. Lucy Negro, Mary Fitton, Emilia Lanier, Elizabeth Wriothesley, and others have been suggested.

==== The Rival Poet ====
The Rival Poet's identity remains a mystery. If Shakespeare's patron and friend was Pembroke, Shakespeare was not the only poet who praised his beauty; Francis Davison did in a sonnet that is the preface to Davison's quarto A Poetical Rhapsody (1608), which was published just before Shakespeare's Sonnets. John Davies of Hereford, Samuel Daniel, George Chapman, Christopher Marlowe, and Ben Jonson are also candidates that find support among clues in the sonnets.

It may be that the Rival Poet is a composite of several poets through which Shakespeare explores his sense of being threatened by competing poets. The speaker sees the Rival Poet as competition for fame and patronage. The sonnets most commonly identified as the Rival Poet group exist within the Fair Youth sequence in sonnets 78–86.

=== "A Lover's Complaint" ===
"A Lover's Complaint" is part two of the quarto published in 1609. It is not written in the sonnet form, but is composed of 47 seven-line stanzas written in rhyme royal. It is an example of a normal feature of the two-part poetic form, in which the first part expresses the male point of view, and the second part contrasts or complements the first part with the female's point of view. The first part of the quarto, the 154 sonnets, considers frustrated male desire, and the second part, "A Lover's Complaint", expresses the misery of a woman victimized by male desire. The earliest Elizabethan example of this two-part structure is Samuel Daniel's Delia ... with the Complaint of Rosamund (1592)—a sonnet sequence that tells the story of a woman being threatened by a man of higher rank, followed by the woman's complaint. This was imitated by other poets, including Shakespeare with his Rape of Lucrece, the last lines of which contain Lucrece's complaint. Other examples are found in the works of Michael Drayton, Thomas Lodge, Richard Barnfield, and others.

The young man of the sonnets and the young man of "A Lover's Complaint" provide a thematic link between the two parts. In each part the young man is handsome, wealthy and promiscuous, unreliable and admired by all.

Like the sonnets, "A Lover's Complaint" also has a possessive form in its title, which is followed by its own assertion of the author's name. This time the possessive word, "Lover's", refers to a woman, who becomes the primary "speaker" of the work.

==== Story of "A Lover's Complaint" ====
"A Lover's Complaint" begins with a young woman weeping at the edge of a river, into which she throws torn-up letters, rings, and other tokens of love. An old man nearby approaches her and asks the reason for her sorrow. She responds by telling him of a former lover who pursued, seduced, and finally abandoned her. She recounts in detail the speech her lover gave to her which seduced her. She concludes her story by conceding that she would fall for the young man's false charms again.

== Dates ==
- 1597 – Shakespeare's tragedy Romeo and Juliet is published. The spoken prologue to the play, and the prologue to Act II are both written in sonnet form, and the first meeting of the star-crossed lovers is written as a sonnet woven into the dialogue.
- 1598 – Love's Labour's Lost is published as a quarto; the play's title page suggests it is a revision of an earlier version. The comedy features the King of Navarre and his lords who express their love in sonnet form for the Queen of France and her ladies. This play is believed to have been performed at the Inns of Court for Queen Elizabeth I in the mid-1590s.
- 1598 – Francis Meres published his quarto Palladis Tamia, which was entered on the Stationers' Register on 7 September that year. In it he mentions that sonnets by Shakespeare were being circulated privately:

As the soule of Euphorbus was thought to live in Pythagoras: so the sweete wittie soule of Ouid liues in mellifluous & hony-tongued Shakespeare, witnes his Venus and Adonis, his Lucrece, his sugred Sonnets among his private friends, &c.

- 1599 – William Jaggard published an octavo volume called The Passionate Pilgrime. By W. Shakespeare. It is an anthology of 20 poems. This small publication contained some spurious content falsely ascribed to Shakespeare; it also contained four sonnets that can be said to be by Shakespeare: Two of the four appear to be early versions of sonnets that were later published in the 1609 quarto (numbers 138 and 144); the other two were sonnets lifted from Shakespeare's play Love's Labour's Lost. Sonnets 138 and 144 are anything but the sweet sonnets hinted at by Francis Meres' comment. They are instead harshly frank, ironic and recriminative regarding the relationship of the speaker and the Dark Lady. The two sonnets that were taken from Love's Labour's Lost, were, in the context of the play, written by comic characters who were intended to be seen as amateur sonneteers. Jaggard's piracy sold well, and a second printing was quickly ordered.
- January 1600 – an entry in the Stationers' Register is for a work that will include "certain other sonnets by W.S." This may suggest that Shakespeare planned to respond right away and correct the impression left by Jaggard's book with Shakespeare's own publication, or the entry may have been merely a "staying entry" not regarding an upcoming publication, but intended to prevent Jaggard from publishing any more sonnets by Shakespeare.
- 14 August 1600 – Shakespeare's play The Chronicle History of Henry the fifth is entered into the Register of the Stationers' Company. The spoken epilogue is written in the form of a sonnet.
- 20 May 1609 – The entry in the Stationers' Register announces Shakespeare's Sonnets. The contents include a collection of 154 sonnets followed by the poem "A Lover's Complaint". This publication was greeted with near silence in the documentary record, especially when compared with the lively reception that followed the publication of Venus and Adonis.
- 1612 – Jaggard issues an expanded edition of his piratical anthology, The Passionate Pilgrim, which had been published in 1599. Thomas Heywood protests this piracy in his Apology for Actors (1612), writing that Shakespeare was "much offended" with Jaggard for making "so bold with his name." Jaggard withdraws the attribution to Shakespeare from unsold copies of the 1612 edition.
- 1640 – The publisher John Benson publishes an anthology of poems; some are by Shakespeare, and about 30 are not, but all are ascribed to Shakespeare. It is titled "Poems: Written by Wil. Shakespeare Gent". Benson is even more wildly piratical than Jaggard. Benson draws on The Passionate Pilgrim and other sources, including Shakespeare's Sonnets (1609), which he rewrites and rearranges. Benson imperfectly rewrites the sonnets to make them appear to be addressing a woman—the pronoun "he" is often replaced by "she". This edition is unfortunately influential and resulted in confusing and confounding various critical understanding and response for more than a century. Deliberate misgendering is also a feature of 17th-century commonplace books which include Sonnet 2, the most popular sonnet to appear in such collections. In Margaret Bellasys' commonplace book the poem appears with the non-gendered title, 'Spes Altera'. In IA's commonplace book, the gender of the addressee is explicitly changed with the title, 'To one that would die a mayd'.
- 1780 – Edmond Malone, in his two volume supplement to the 1778 Johnson-Stevens edition of the plays, finally instates the 1609 quarto edition of Shakespeare's Sonnets as the sole authoritative text.
- 1986 – The New Penguin Shakespeare's edition of the sonnets restores "A Lover's Complaint" as an integral part of Shakespeare's Sonnets.

== Criticism ==
In his plays, Shakespeare himself seemed to be a satiric critic of sonnets – the allusions to them are often scornful. Yet he went on to create one of the longest sonnet-sequences of his era, a sequence that took some sharp turns away from the tradition.

He may have been inspired out of literary ambition, and a desire to carve new paths apart from the well-worn tradition. Or he may have been inspired by biographical elements in his life. It is thought that the biographical aspects have been over-explored and over-speculated on, especially in the face of a paucity of evidence. The critical focus has turned instead (through New Criticism and by scholars such as Stephen Booth and Helen Vendler) to the text itself, which is studied and appreciated linguistically as a "highly complex structure of language and ideas".

Besides the biographic and the linguistic approaches, another way of considering Shakespeare's sonnets is in the context of the culture and literature that surrounds them.

Gerald Hammond, in his book The Reader and the Young Man Sonnets, suggests that the non-expert reader, who is thoughtful and engaged, does not need that much help in understanding the sonnets: though, he states, the reader may often feel mystified when trying to decide, for example, if a word or passage has a concrete meaning or an abstract meaning; laying that kind of perplexity in the reader's path for the reader to deal with is an essential part of reading the sonnets—the reader doesn't always benefit from having knots untangled and double-meanings simplified by the experts, according to Hammond.

During the eighteenth century, The Sonnets' reputation in England was relatively low; in 1805, The Critical Review credited John Milton with the perfection of the English sonnet. Towards the end of the nineteenth century, Shakespeare and Milton seemed to be on an equal footing, but critics, burdened by an over-emphasis on biographical explorations, continued to contend with each other for decades on this point.

== Editions ==
Like all Shakespeare's works, Shakespeare's Sonnets have been reprinted many times. Prominent editions include:

First edition and facsimile

- Shakespeare, William (1609). Shake-speares Sonnets: Never Before Imprinted. London: Thomas Thorpe.
- Lee, Sidney, ed. (1905). Shakespeares Sonnets: Being a reproduction in facsimile of the first edition. Oxford: Clarendon Press. OCLC 458829162.

Variorum editions

- Alden, Raymond Macdonald, ed. (1916). The Sonnets of Shakespeare. Boston: Houghton Mifflin Harcourt. OCLC 234756.
- Rollins, Hyder Edward, ed. (1944). A New Variorum Edition of Shakespeare: The Sonnets [2 Volumes]. Philadelphia: J. B. Lippincott & Co. OCLC 6028485. — Volume I and Volume II at the Internet Archive

Modern critical editions

- Atkins, Carl D., ed. (2007). Shakespeare's Sonnets: With Three Hundred Years of Commentary. Madison: Fairleigh Dickinson University Press. ISBN 978-0-8386-4163-7. OCLC 86090499.
- Booth, Stephen, ed. (2000) [1st ed. 1977]. Shakespeare's Sonnets (Rev. ed.). New Haven: Yale Nota Bene. ISBN 0-300-01959-9. OCLC 2968040.
- Burrow, Colin, ed. (2002). The Complete Sonnets and Poems. The Oxford Shakespeare. Oxford: Oxford University Press. ISBN 978-0192819338. OCLC 48532938.
- Duncan-Jones, Katherine, ed. (2010) [1st ed. 1997]. Shakespeare's Sonnets. Arden Shakespeare, third series (Rev. ed.). London: Bloomsbury. ISBN 978-1-4080-1797-5. OCLC 755065951. — 1st edition at the Internet Archive
- Evans, G. Blakemore, ed. (1996). The Sonnets. The New Cambridge Shakespeare. Cambridge: Cambridge University Press. ISBN 978-0521294034. OCLC 32272082.
- Kerrigan, John, ed. (1995) [1st ed. 1986]. The Sonnets ; and, A Lover's Complaint. New Penguin Shakespeare (Rev. ed.). Penguin Books. ISBN 0-14-070732-8. OCLC 15018446.
- Mowat, Barbara A.; Werstine, Paul, eds. (2006). Shakespeare's Sonnets & Poems. Folger Shakespeare Library. New York: Washington Square Press. ISBN 978-0743273282. OCLC 64594469.
- Orgel, Stephen, ed. (2001). The Sonnets. The Pelican Shakespeare (Rev. ed.). New York: Penguin Books. ISBN 978-0140714531. OCLC 46683809.
- Vendler, Helen, ed. (1997). The Art of Shakespeare's Sonnets. Cambridge, Massachusetts: The Belknap Press of Harvard University Press. ISBN 0-674-63712-7. OCLC 36806589.

== Sonnets that occur in the plays ==
There are sonnets written by Shakespeare that occur in his plays, and these include his earliest sonnets. They differ from the 154 sonnets published in the 1609, because they may lack the deep introspection, for example, and they are written to serve the needs of a performance, exposition or narrative.

=== Early comedies ===
In Shakespeare's early comedies, the sonnets and sonnet-making of his characters are often objects of satire. In Two Gentlemen of Verona, sonnet-writing is portrayed cynically as a seduction technique. In Love's Labour's Lost, sonnets are portrayed as evidence that love can render men weak and foolish. In Much Ado About Nothing, Beatrice and Benedick each write a sonnet, which serves as proof that they have fallen in love. In All’s Well that Ends Well, a partial sonnet is read, and Bertram comments, "He shall be whipp'd through the army with this rhyme in's forehead." In Henry V, the Dauphin suggests he will compose a sonnet to his horse.

The sonnets that Shakespeare satirizes in his plays are sonnets written in the tradition of Petrarch and Sidney, whereas Shakespeare's sonnets published in the quarto of 1609 take a radical turn away from that older style, and have none of the lovelorn qualities that are mocked in the plays. The sonnets published in 1609 seem to be rebelling against the tradition.

In the play Love's Labour's Lost, the King and his three lords have all vowed to live like monks, to study, to give up worldly things, and to see no women. All of them break the last part of the vow by falling in love. The lord Longaville expresses his love in a sonnet ("Did not the heavenly rhetoric of thine eye…"), and the lord Berowne does, too—a hexameter sonnet ("If love make me forsworn, how shall I swear to love?")–a form Sidney uses in six of the sonnets in Astrophel and Stella (Numbers 1, 6, 8, 76, and 102). These sonnets contain comic imperfections, including awkward phrasing, and problems with the meter. After Berowne is caught breaking his vow, and exposed by the sonnet he composed, he passionately renounces speech that is affected, and vows to prefer plain country speech. Ironically, when proclaiming this he demonstrates that he can't seem to avoid rich courtly language, and his speech happens to fall into the meter and rhyme of a sonnet. ("O, never will I trust to speeches penned…")

=== Henry V ===
The epilogue at the end of the play Henry V is written in the form of a sonnet ("Thus far with rough, and all-unable pen…"). Formal epilogues were established as a theatrical tradition, and occur in 13 of Shakespeare's plays. In Henry V, the character of Chorus, who has addressed the audience a few times during the play, speaks the wide-ranging epilogue/sonnet. It begins by allowing that the play may not have presented the story in its full glory. It points out that the next king would be Henry VI, who was an infant when he succeeded Henry V, and who "lost France, and made his England bleed/ Which oft our stage hath shown." It refers to the three parts of Henry VI and to Richard III — connecting the Lancastrian and the Yorkist cycles.

=== Romeo and Juliet ===
Three sonnets are found in Romeo and Juliet: The prologue to the play ("Two households, both alike in dignity…"), the prologue to the second act ("Now old desire doth in his death-bed lie…"), and set in the form of a dialogue sonnet at the moment when Romeo and Juliet meet:

ROMEO
If I profane with my unworthiest hand
This holy shrine, the gentle fine is this:
My lips, two blushing pilgrims, ready stand
To smooth that rough touch with a tender kiss.
JULIET
Good pilgrim, you do wrong your hand too much,
Which mannerly devotion shows in this;
For saints have hands that pilgrims' hands do touch,
And palm to palm is holy palmers' kiss.
ROMEO
Have not saints lips, and holy palmers too?
JULIET
Ay, pilgrim, lips that they must use in prayer.
ROMEO
O, then, dear saint, let lips do what hands do;
They pray, grant thou, lest faith turn to despair.
JULIET
Saints do not move, though grant for prayers' sake.
ROMEO
Then move not, while my prayer's effect I take.

=== Much Ado About Nothing ===
Two sonnets are mentioned in Much Ado About Nothing—sonnets by Beatrice and Benedick—and though not committed to paper, they were in Shakespeare's mind. The first one, revealed by Claudio, is described as "A halting sonnet of his own pure brain/Fashion'd to Beatrice". The second, found by Hero, was "Writ in my cousin's hand, stolen from her pocket/Containing her affection unto Benedick".

=== Edward III ===
The play Edward III has recently become accepted as part of Shakespeare's canon of plays. It was considered an anonymous work, and that is how it was first published, but in the late 1990s it began to be included in publications of the complete works as co-authored by Shakespeare. Scholars who have supported this attribution include Jonathan Bate, Edward Capell, Eliot Slater, Eric Sams, Giorgio Melchiori, Brian Vickers, and others. The play, printed in 1596, contains language and themes that also appear in Shakespeare's sonnets, including the line: "Lilies that fester smell far worse than weeds", which occurs in sonnet 94 and the phrase "scarlet ornaments", which occurs in sonnet 142. The scene of the play that contains those quotations is a comic scene that features a poet attempting to compose a love poem at the behest of his king, Edward III. At the time Edward III was published, Shakespeare's sonnets were known by some, but they had not yet been published.

The king, Edward III, has fallen in love with the Countess of Salisbury, and he tells Lodowick, his secretary, to fetch ink and paper. Edward wants Lodowick's help in composing a poem that will sing the praises of the countess. Lodowick has a question:

LODOWICK
Write I to a woman?

KING EDWARD
What beauty else could triumph over me,
Or who but women do our love lays greet?
What, thinkest thou I did bid thee praise a horse?

The king then expresses and dictates his passion in exuberant poetry, and asks Lodowick to read back to him what he has been able to write down. Lodowick reads:

LODOWICK.
'More fair and chaste'—

KING EDWARD.
I did not bid thee talk of chastity ...

When the countess enters, the poetry-writing scene is interrupted without Lodowick having accomplished much poetry—only two lines:

More fair and chaste than is the queen of shades,
More bold in constance ... Than Judith was.

== See also ==
- George Bernard Shaw's The Dark Lady of the Sonnets
- Sonnet 1 to Sonnet 154 (full list)
