= Sonnet 25 =

« » Sonnet 25
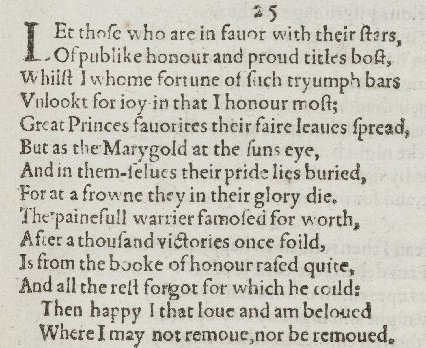
- Sonnet 25 in the 1609 Quarto
Q1
Q2
Q3
C
Let those who are in favour with their stars
Of public honour and proud titles boast,
Whilst I, whom fortune of such triumph bars,
Unlook’d for joy in that I honour most.
Great princes’ favourites their fair leaves spread
But as the marigold at the sun’s eye,
And in themselves their pride lies buried,
For at a frown they in their glory die.
The painful warrior famoused for worth,
After a thousand victories once foil’d,
Is from the book of honour razed quite,
And all the rest forgot for which he toil’d:
Then happy I, that love and am beloved
Where I may not remove nor be removed.
—William Shakespeare
4
8
12
14

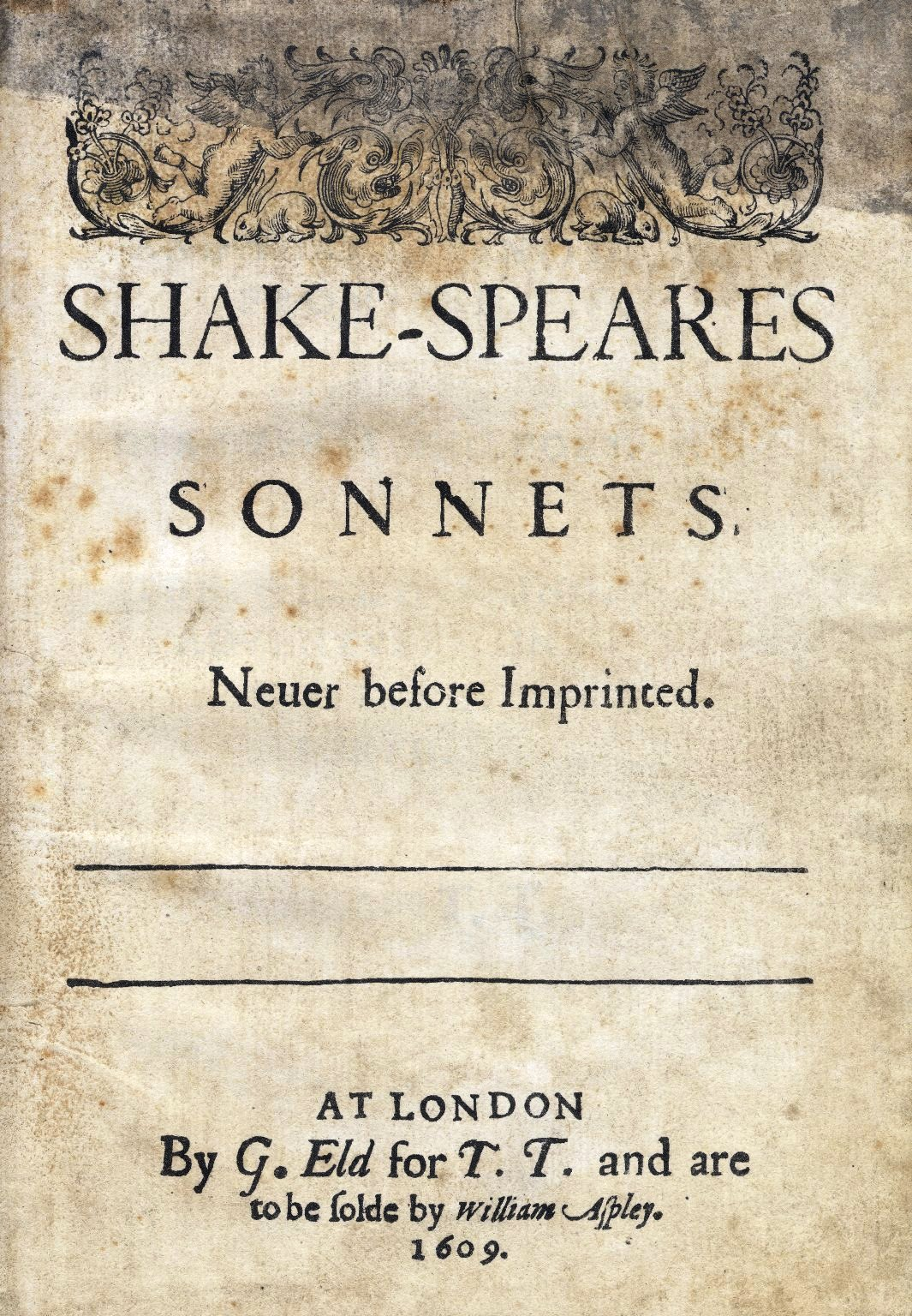
Shakespeare's Sonnets

Sonnet 25 is one of 154 sonnets published by the English playwright and poet William Shakespeare in the Quarto of 1609. It is a part of the Fair Youth sequence.

In the sonnet the poem expresses the poet's contentedness in comparison to others, though they may have titles, honors, or are favored at court, or are noted warriors. It prefigures the more famous treatment of class differences found in Sonnet 29. There are noted similarities in this sonnet and in the relationship of Romeo and Juliet.

== Synopsis ==
Q1 The Speaker contrasts those who are fortunate (whether by the astrological influence of real "stars", or the social influence of their superiors, metaphorical "stars") with himself who, favored with no such public recognition, nevertheless can revel ("joy" is used as a verb) in what he holds most dear. Q2 These seeming fortunates display their "pride" (i.e. self-esteem, or finery) like an opening marigold, but only so long as their prince ("sun") favors them. (Elizabethans knew the marigold as a flower that opened in the presence, and closed in the absence, of the sun.) Q3 Similarly, even a warrior renowned for "a thousand victories" may be stripped of his honor and forgotten after a single defeat. C But the Speaker is happy in his mutual love, from which he cannot be removed, either by himself or by others.

== Structure ==
Sonnet 25 is an English or Shakespearean sonnet, formed of three quatrains and a final couplet in iambic pentameter, a type of metre based on five pairs of metrically weak/strong syllabic positions. The 12th line exemplifies a regular iambic pentameter:

×   /     ×  /    ×  /   ×    /    ×  /
And all the rest forgot for which he toil'd: (25.12)

/ = ictus, a metrically strong syllabic position. × = nonictus.

The 10th line begins with a common metrical variant, the initial reversal:

/  ×  ×   /  ×    /  × /   ×     /
After a thousand victories once foil'd, (25.10)

The 6th line also has a potential initial reversal, as well as the rightward movement of the fourth ictus (resulting in a four-position figure, × × / /, sometimes referred to as a minor ionic):

 /  ×    ×  / × /   ×    ×  /    /
But as the marigold at the sun's eye, (25.6)

Potential initial reversals also occur in lines 1 and 11, with line 8 potentially exhibiting both an initial and midline reversal. Minor ionics appear in lines 2 and 3.

The meter demands a few variant pronunciations: line 3's "favourites" functions as 3 syllables, and line 9's "warrior" as 2 syllables. The final -ed is syllabic in line 7's 3-syllable "burièd", line 9's 3-syllable "famousèd" and line 11's 2-syllable "razèd". Stephen Booth notes that the original typography suggests that the final rhymes may have been intended to be trisyllabic: "belovèd" and "removèd", although other editors (like John Kerrigan) prefer the standard 2-syllable pronunciations.

== Emendations ==
This sonnet, as originally printed, departs from the English sonnet's rhyme scheme, ABAB CDCD EFEF GG. Lines 9 and 11 (the expected e lines) do not rhyme. These lines in the Quarto of 1609 read (with emphasis added):

The painefull warrier famoſed for worth,
...
Is from the booke of honour raſed quite,

No other lines in Shakespeare's Sonnets fail to rhyme, and Shakespeare's typical sonnet structure demands that these lines should rhyme with each other. Most editors emend one or the other of these words to form one of three rhyming pairs:

- fight – quite — first suggested by Lewis Theobald and "the more popular of the two generally favored emendations".
- might – quite — first suggested by Edward Capell and the second most popular according to Booth.
- worth – forth — also suggested by Theobald. This emendation was preferred by John Payne Collier.

Duncan-Jones sees weaknesses in all three emendations, and retains the Quarto's non-rhyming pair worth – quite. George Steevens opined that "this stanza is not worth the labour that has been bestowed on it."

== Analysis ==
=== Astrological References ===
Shakespeare refers to the influences of astrology and fate in this poem. Stars are cited as the luck-giving ones that favor some with positions at court. The reference made to the "favour of the stars" is also a metaphor for the members of the court keeping in favour of the King. Because courtly status is gifted by the stars and not earned, it is precarious. John Kerrigan notes that the astrology metaphor of the first quatrain "scornfully severs advancement from merit, attributing success to chance."

=== Marigold Metaphor ===
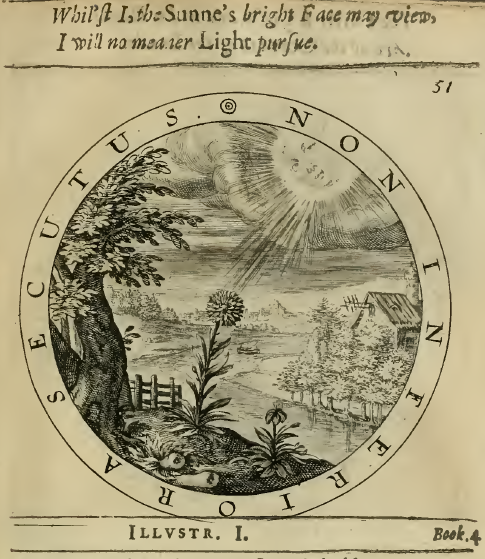
Marigold emblem engraved by Crispin van Passe, as published in George Wither's Collection of Emblems (1635) The Latin motto may be translated: "He followed no lesser."

Edward Dowden notes that the marigold was most commonly mentioned in Renaissance literature as a heliotrope, with the various symbolic associations connected to that type of plant; William James Rolfe finds an analogous reference to the plant in George Wither's poetry:

When, with a serious musing, I behold
The gratefull, and obsequious Marigold,
How duely, ev'ry morning, she displayes
Her open breast, when Titan spreads his Rayes; ...
How, when he downe declines, she droopes and mournes,
Bedew'd (as 'twere) with teares, till he returnes; ... (lines 1–4, 7–8)

but whereas for Wither the sun represents God and the marigold's reliance upon it is a virtue, Shakespeare's "sun" is mortal and fickle and reliance upon this sun is a risk. Edmond Malone noted the resemblance of lines 5–8 to this section of Wolsey's farewell in Henry VIII:

This is the state of man: to-day he puts forth
The tender leaves of hopes, to-morrow blossoms,
And bears his blushing honors thick upon him;
The third day comes a frost, a killing frost,
And when he thinks, good easy man, full surely
His greatness is a-ripening, nips his root,
And then he falls as I do. (III.ii.352–358)

Ironically, this passage is now widely (though not universally) held to have been written by John Fletcher.

== Essex's Rebellion, style of allusion, and "compensation" ==
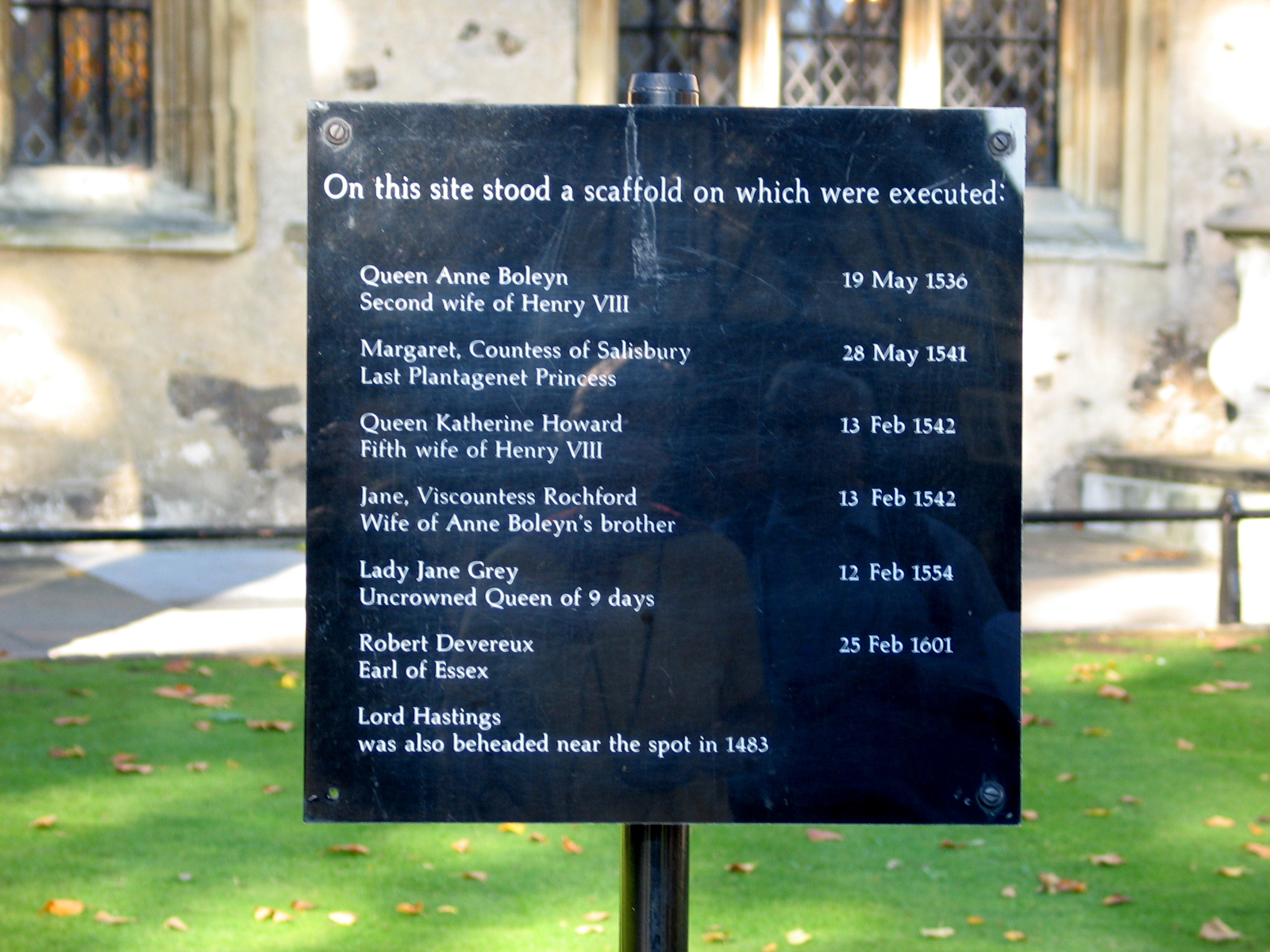
Robert Devereux, 2nd Earl of Essex fell out of favour with, and rebelled against, Queen Elizabeth I, for which he was executed at the Tower of London.

In Sonnet 25 may allude to Essex's Rebellion. In Themes and Variations in Shakespeare's Sonnets (1961), James Blair Leishman criticised preceding approaches to Shakespeare's sonnets, feeling they either excessively focussed on the identity of "W.H.", the Fair Youth, the Rival Poet, or the Dark Lady; or they analysed the sonnets' style in isolation. To remedy this perceived lack, Leishman sets out to analyse the sonnets by comparison and contrast with other poets and sonneteers like Pindar, Horace and Ovid; Petrarch, Torquato Tasso, and Pierre de Ronsard; and Shakespeare's English predecessors and contemporaries Edmund Spenser, Samuel Daniel, and John Donne. Here Leishman agrees that the sonnet contains such allusions, but argues that it is more likely to have been written, and the allusions being to, the state of affairs shortly after Essex's return from Ireland in 1599—as opposed to after Essex's trial and execution in 1601—when the issue was fresh in Shakespeare's mind. In this interpretation, Essex is the "painful warrior famoused for fight" who "After a thousand victories" in Ireland "Is from the book of honor razed quite, / And all the rest forgot for which he toil'd:".

Leishman also names Sonnet 25 as an example of a contrast between the style of Shakespeare's sonnets and Drayton: where Drayton directly names the people he refers to, and references public events "in a perfectly plain and unambiguous manner," Shakespeare never directly includes names and all his allusions to public events are couched in metaphor. He draws a comparison to Dante Alighieri and calls the style "Dantesquely periphrastic".

In Leishman's critical framework, Sonnets 25, 29 and 37 are examples of what he calls a theme of "compensation". In this theme, the Poet views the Fair Youth as a divine compensation "for all his own deficiencies of talent and fortune and for all his failures and disappointments." The Poet's faults, the troubles he has met, and the losses he has suffered, are compensated by the positive attributes and the friendship of the Fair Youth.

== Audio recording ==
- The actor, David Warner, reads this sonnet on the 2002 album When Love Speaks (EMI Classics)
