= Sonnet 27 =

« » Sonnet 27
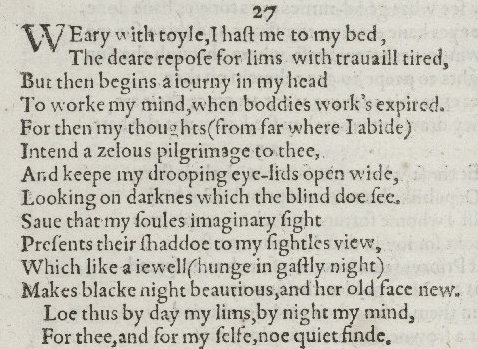
- Sonnet 27 in the 1609 Quarto
Q1
Q2
Q3
C
Weary with toil, I haste me to my bed,
The dear repose for limbs with travail tired;
But then begins a journey in my head
To work my mind, when body’s work’s expired:
For then my thoughts, from far where I abide,
Intend a zealous pilgrimage to thee,
And keep my drooping eyelids open wide,
Looking on darkness which the blind do see;
Save that my soul’s imaginary sight
Presents thy shadow to my sightless view,
Which like a jewel hung in ghastly night
Makes black night beauteous, and her old face new:
Lo, thus, by day my limbs, by night my mind,
For thee, and for myself, no quiet find.
—William Shakespeare
4
8
12
14

Sonnet 27 is one of 154 sonnets published by William Shakespeare in a quarto titled Shakespeare's Sonnets in 1609. It is a part of the Fair Youth group of sonnets, and the first in a group of five sonnets that portray the poet in solitude and meditating from a distance on the young man. A theme of the first two of the group (sonnets 27 - 28) regards the night and restlessness, which is a motif also found in the sonnets of Petrarch.

== Analysis ==
In Sonnet 27 the weary poet cannot find rest — not day or night. He goes to bed weary after working hard, which is the "toil" of line one, and the "travail" of line two. As soon as he lies down, another journey begins in his thoughts ("To work my mind") — the destination is the young man, who is far from where the poet is ("from far where I abide"). The poet's thoughts take that journey, and though he sees nothing but the darkness of night, his imagination presents to him an image of the young man, an image that seems to hang before him in the dark, like a jewel. This vision makes the "black night" beautiful — the word "black" is equated with ugliness and "night" has a feminine aspect. The reader is led to expect this vision to improve the poet's lot, but the final couplet suggests that it only adds to the restless misery of the weary poet, and "no quiet" can the poet find.

== Structure ==
Sonnet 27 is an English or Shakespearean sonnet, which consists of three quatrains followed by a final couplet. It follows the rhyme scheme ABAB CDCD EFEF GG, and is written in iambic pentameter, a metre in which each line has five feet, and each foot has two syllables accented weak/strong. Most of the lines are regular iambic pentameter including line three:

 ×   /    ×  /  ×   /  ×   /  ×   / 
But then begins a journey in my head (27.3)

/ = ictus, a metrically strong syllabic position. × = nonictus.
