= Sonnet 26 =

« » Sonnet 26
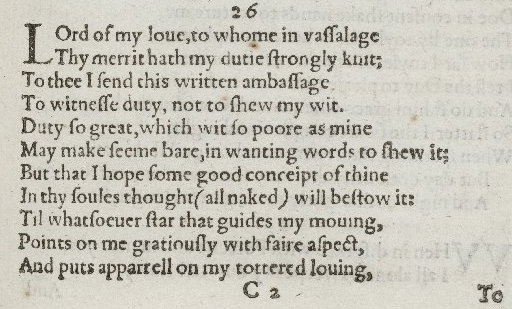
- The first eleven lines of Sonnet 26 in the 1609 Quarto
Q1
Q2
Q3
C
Lord of my love, to whom in vassalage
Thy merit hath my duty strongly knit,
To thee I send this written ambassage,
To witness duty, not to show my wit:
Duty so great, which wit so poor as mine
May make seem bare, in wanting words to show it,
But that I hope some good conceit of thine
In thy soul’s thought, all naked, will bestow it;
Till whatsoever star that guides my moving,
Points on me graciously with fair aspect,
And puts apparel on my tatter’d loving,
To show me worthy of thy sweet respect:
Then may I dare to boast how I do love thee;
Till then not show my head where thou mayst prove me.
—William Shakespeare
4
8
12
14

Sonnet 26 is one of 154 sonnets written by the English playwright and poet William Shakespeare, and is a part of the Fair Youth sequence.

The sonnet is generally regarded as the end-point or culmination of the group of five preceding poems. It encapsulates several themes not only of Sonnets 20–25, but also of the first thirty-two poems together: the function of writing poems, the effect of class differences, and love.

== Structure ==
Sonnet 26 is a typical English or Shakespearean sonnet, formed of three quatrains and a couplet, having a rhyme scheme of ABAB CDCD EFEF GG. It is composed in iambic pentameter, a type of poetic metre based on five pairs of metrically weak/strong syllabic positions per line.

The seventh line exemplifies a regular iambic pentameter line. The next contains a final extrametrical syllable or feminine ending, of which this sonnet has six; it also exhibits an ictus moved to the right (resulting in a four-position figure, × × / /, sometimes referred to as a minor ionic):

But that I hope some good conceit of thine

 
In thy soul's thought, all naked, will bestow it: (26.7-8)

/ = ictus, a metrically strong syllabic position. × = nonictus. (×) = extrametrical syllable.

== Synopsis and analysis ==
As Stephen Booth notes, Sonnet 26 works on a series of "shows": the word appears in four separate lines of the sonnet. Booth perceives a vague sexual pun in the second half of the poem, but G. B. Evans and others describe this reading as "strained." The first "show" in the sonnet is directed to Cupid, to whom in servitude the poet's duty is "knit". The connection is compounded by the later "bare" and "all naked." The figure of the naked Cupid can be traced back to Ovid's Amores.

Capell, Dowden and others have seen Sonnet 26 as an envoy or introduction to a certain set of poems sent to an aristocrat who had commissioned them. The dedicatory sonnets are usually defined as 20–25, but they are sometimes extended to all of the first 25 sonnets. Others, among them George Wyndham and Henry Charles Beeching, make Sonnet 26 the introduction of a new set, running until Sonnet 32.

Assuming the sonnet is an envoy or "ambassage", a submission of a vassal seeking preferment from a Lord, we are presented with a pastiche of ink-horn terms. The plainant extols the Lord's "merit" and, disingenuously, his own meagre abilities, his "wit". Sonnet 26's inflated formality exposes the subservience required of letters seeking favour. The poet seems dutiful, the purpose of his letter being not to display his "wit" but to bear "witness" to his "duty". His "duty" is "so great" and his ability "so poore", that his language may seem "bare", lacking "words" and adornment. Except that ("But that") the poet's hope is that the youth's "good conceit", his fine 'thought' or 'fancy' or even his 'opinion,' which can be found in his "soul's thought", will dress up the poet's "all naked" or "bare" missive of love.

The sestet picks up the astrological motif of the previous sonnet, where the poet's love, unlike those who boast of the "favour of the stars", is at sufficient "remove" to be impervious to stellar influence. The youth's is required until such time as the poet's personal star, that which "guides" his "moving", shines favourably upon him ("points on me graciously with fair aspect"); "points" means 'directs' or 'influences' the poet, but was used of the zodiacal signs. Astrologically "aspect" (from the Latin ad + spicere = to look at or upon) is the manner in which a heavenly body or a conjunction of bodies looks upon the earth and its individuals, in this case "with favour".

The youth's "conceit," then, is needed until the time that his star "puts apparel on my tattered loving", until it dresses, as a bare or plain thing might be adorned, his loving which is clothed in tatters. He will be shown "worthy of their sweet respect", worthy of the countenance of "whatsoever star". Capell and Malone emend the quarto's "their" (line 12) to "thy". Other editors find the change unnecessary.

At such a moment the poet may boast of his love, as others might have in Sonnet 25, but until then he dare not. Until then he vows not to "show my head". To remain unnoticed or as an act of obeisance he will keep his head down, so that his Lord may not test him or his love ("prove"); "me" is a synecdoche for 'my love'.

The poem, like many others in the sequence, is built on a conceit rooted in social class. In this context, the master-servant trope commonplace in Petrarchan love poetry is literalised, by the poem's address to an imagined noble. Helen Vendler argues that the speaker's identification of himself as a slave or vassal invites skepticism rather than identification; however, others have stressed the appropriateness of the metaphor in the context of the speaker's frustrated desire for equality with the beloved.

Analysis of this sonnet was at one point focused on its provenance. Edward Capell was the first of several scholars to note the similarity of content between the first quatrain and the dedication to Henry Wriothesley in The Rape of Lucrece. Other scholars have speculated that the poem was written to accompany some other of Shakespeare's writings, perhaps the first group of sonnets. Edward Massey and Sidney Lee, among others, accept the connection between sonnet and dedication; among the skeptics are Thomas Tyler, Nicolaus Delius, and Hermann Isaac. More specific arguments have been made that the poem's similarities to the Venus dedications indicate that the poem was written to Southampton. Modern analysts are more likely to remain agnostic on the question of the occasion of the poem, if any; all agree, however, that the sonnet at least dramatizes the type of emotions an older but lower-class poet might express toward a potential noble patron.

== Further References ==
- Baldwin, T. W. (1950). On the Literary Genetics of Shakspeare's Sonnets. University of Illinois Press, Urbana.
- Hubler, Edwin (1952). The Sense of Shakespeare's Sonnets. Princeton University Press, Princeton.
- Lee, Sidney (1904). Elizabethan Sonnets. Westminster: Constable, 1904.
- Schallwyck, David (2002). Speech and Performance in Shakespeare's Plays and Sonnets. Cambridge University Press, Cambridge.
- Schoenfeldt, Michael (2007). The Sonnets: The Cambridge Companion to Shakespeare's Poetry. Patrick Cheney, Cambridge University Press, Cambridge.

First edition and facsimile

- Shakespeare, William (1609). Shake-speares Sonnets: Never Before Imprinted. London: Thomas Thorpe.
- Lee, Sidney, ed. (1905). Shakespeares Sonnets: Being a reproduction in facsimile of the first edition. Oxford: Clarendon Press. OCLC 458829162.

Variorum editions

- Alden, Raymond Macdonald, ed. (1916). The Sonnets of Shakespeare. Boston: Houghton Mifflin Harcourt. OCLC 234756.
- Rollins, Hyder Edward, ed. (1944). A New Variorum Edition of Shakespeare: The Sonnets [2 Volumes]. Philadelphia: J. B. Lippincott & Co. OCLC 6028485. — Volume I and Volume II at the Internet Archive

Modern critical editions

- Atkins, Carl D., ed. (2007). Shakespeare's Sonnets: With Three Hundred Years of Commentary. Madison: Fairleigh Dickinson University Press. ISBN 978-0-8386-4163-7. OCLC 86090499.
- Booth, Stephen, ed. (2000) [1st ed. 1977]. Shakespeare's Sonnets (Rev. ed.). New Haven: Yale Nota Bene. ISBN 0-300-01959-9. OCLC 2968040.
- Burrow, Colin, ed. (2002). The Complete Sonnets and Poems. The Oxford Shakespeare. Oxford: Oxford University Press. ISBN 978-0192819338. OCLC 48532938.
- Duncan-Jones, Katherine, ed. (2010) [1st ed. 1997]. Shakespeare's Sonnets. Arden Shakespeare, third series (Rev. ed.). London: Bloomsbury. ISBN 978-1-4080-1797-5. OCLC 755065951. — 1st edition at the Internet Archive
- Evans, G. Blakemore, ed. (1996). The Sonnets. The New Cambridge Shakespeare. Cambridge: Cambridge University Press. ISBN 978-0521294034. OCLC 32272082.
- Kerrigan, John, ed. (1995) [1st ed. 1986]. The Sonnets ; and, A Lover's Complaint. New Penguin Shakespeare (Rev. ed.). Penguin Books. ISBN 0-14-070732-8. OCLC 15018446.
- Mowat, Barbara A.; Werstine, Paul, eds. (2006). Shakespeare's Sonnets & Poems. Folger Shakespeare Library. New York: Washington Square Press. ISBN 978-0743273282. OCLC 64594469.
- Orgel, Stephen, ed. (2001). The Sonnets. The Pelican Shakespeare (Rev. ed.). New York: Penguin Books. ISBN 978-0140714531. OCLC 46683809.
- Vendler, Helen, ed. (1997). The Art of Shakespeare's Sonnets. Cambridge, Massachusetts: The Belknap Press of Harvard University Press. ISBN 0-674-63712-7. OCLC 36806589.
