= Sonnet 51 =

« » Sonnet 51
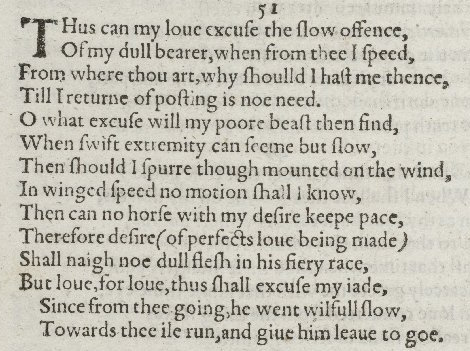
- Sonnet 51 in the 1609 Quarto
Q1
Q2
Q3
C
Thus can my love excuse the slow offence
Of my dull bearer when from thee I speed:
From where thou art why should I haste me thence?
Till I return, of posting is no need.
O, what excuse will my poor beast then find,
When swift extremity can seem but slow?
Then should I spur, though mounted on the wind,
In winged speed no motion shall I know:
Then can no horse with my desire keep pace;
Therefore desire, of perfect’st love being made,
Shall neigh—no dull flesh—in his fiery race;
But love, for love, thus shall excuse my jade;
Since from thee going he went wilful-slow,
Towards thee I’ll run, and give him leave to go.
—William Shakespeare
4
8
12
14

Sonnet 51 is one of 154 sonnets written by the English playwright and poet William Shakespeare. It is part of the Fair Youth sequence, in which the poet expresses his love towards a young man. It is a continuation of the argument from Sonnet 50.

According to the Norton Anthology, sonnet 51 is considered part of the "long sequence" (18-126) and focuses on the young man who Shakespeare wrote about in the preceding group of sonnets namely the first 17 sonnets known as the procreation sonnets. This poem focuses on a young man fighting time to return to his lover, and includes description of haste and timeliness.

== Structure ==
Sonnet 51 is an English or Shakespearean sonnet. An English sonnet contains three quatrains, followed by a final rhyming couplet. It follows the form's typical rhyme scheme, ABAB CDCD EFEF GG, and is composed in a type of poetic metre called iambic pentameter based on five pairs of metrically weak/strong syllabic positions. The sixth line exemplifies a regular iambic pentameter:

  ×    /   ×   / × /  ×   /    ×    / 
When swift extremity can seem but slow? (51.6)

/ = ictus, a metrically strong syllabic position. × = nonictus.

The fifth line, while it may be scanned as a regular iambic pentameter, may also be scanned with two variations:

/    ×  ×  /    ×    ×  /    /      ×   / 
O! what excuse will my poor beast then find, (51.5)

The first is an initial reversal, the second a rightward movement of the third ictus (resulting in a four-position figure, × × / /, sometimes referred to as a minor ionic). There are seven possible initial reversals in this sonnet (in lines one, four, five, seven, eight, thirteen, and fourteen), three possible mid-line reversals (in lines three, eleven, and twelve) and two possible minor ionics (moving the first ictus of line two, and the third ictus of line five). This metrical agitation contrasts with the plodding regularity of Sonnet 50.
