= Sonnet 28 =

« » Sonnet 28
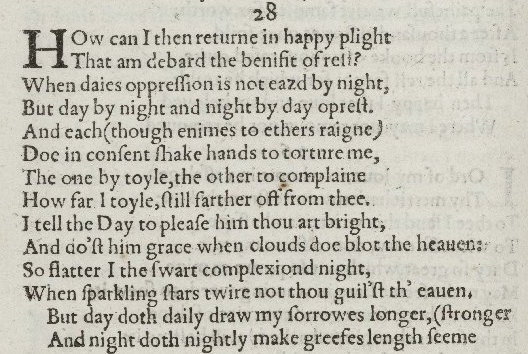
- Sonnet 28 in the 1609 Quarto
Q1
Q2
Q3
C
How can I then return in happy plight
That am debarred the benefit of rest?
When day’s oppression is not eased by night,
But day by night and night by day oppressed?
And each, though enemies to either’s reign,
Do in consent shake hands to torture me,
The one by toil, the other to complain
How far I toil, still farther off from thee.
I tell the day to please him, thou art bright,
And dost him grace, when clouds do blot the heaven;
So flatter I the swart-complexioned night,
When sparkling stars twire not thou guil'st the even;
But day doth daily draw my sorrows longer,
And night doth nightly make grief’s length seem stronger.
—William Shakespeare
4
8
12
14

Sonnet 28 is one of 154 sonnets published by the English playwright and poet William Shakespeare in 1609. It is a part of what is considered the Fair Youth group, and part of another group (sonnets 27, 28, 43 and 61) that focuses on the solitary poet reflecting on his friend. There is a theme of night and sleeplessness, which is a traditional motif that also occurs in Petrarchan sonnets.

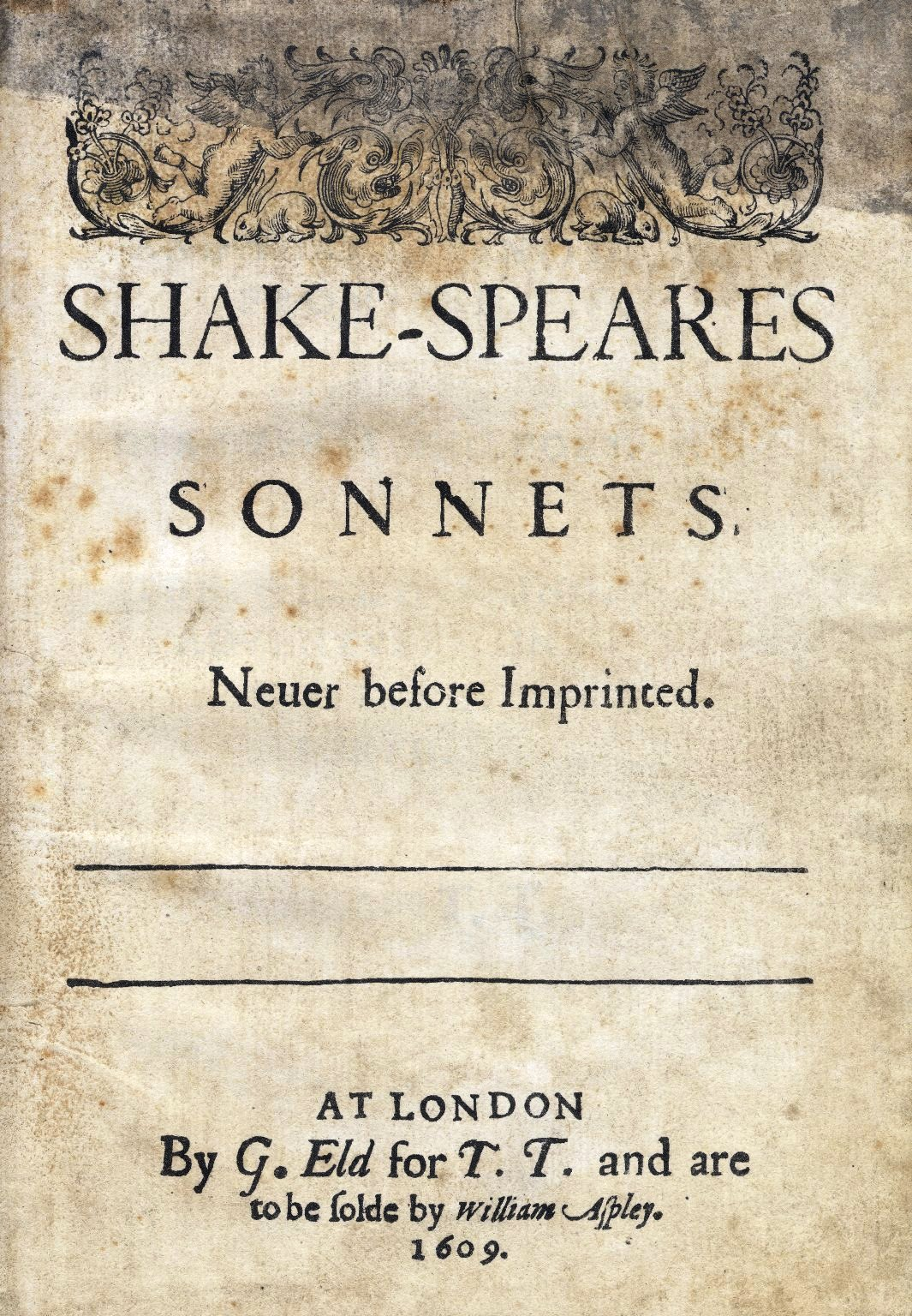

== Exegesis ==
Themes in Sonnet 28 begin in Sonnet 27, and continue into sonnets 43 and 61: All four sonnets find the poet alone in bed at night in the dark trying unsuccessfully to conjure with his mind's eye the image of the young man. All four describe the nightly disquiet that keeps him awake, and the imaginative journey that occurs in the mind of a poet.

Sonnet 28's first quatrain begins questioning how the poet can return to the young man in a happy plight. The concern is that at night he is prevented from resting, and by day he is oppressed by toil. The toil is the toil of travel, and the description of travel in the previous sonnet (Sonnet 27) is the journey that takes place in a poet's imagination. So, the word toil appears to be referring to the poet's work: the search for words and metaphors to describe his fair young friend.

In the second quatrain, Day and Night are personified as a pair of tyrants who were enemies to each other, but who have now shaken hands to join forces to torture the poet. Day tortures the poet with toil, Night tortures him by causing him to lament how far off the poet is from the young man. If toil is interpreted as the work of a poet, then the torture is a metaphor for the poet's anguish that his efforts to find poetic expressions and metaphors to describe the young man are not getting closer to the young man, but are moving away. This is not letting him sleep. The Day and the Night are disturbed that the young man, or at least his image, will not appear to the poet, so they attempt to torture it out of him.

The third quatrain begins (line 9) with the poet telling the young man that he (the poet) flatters the day by telling him he is bright, and that he graces the young man even when the clouds hide the sun. In a similar way, the poet flatters the dark (swart) complexioned night. The poet, motivated to stop the torture and conjure the image of the young man, beguiles (guil’st) the evening. Beguiles is used here to mean tricks or deceives.

The high level of ambiguity in the third quatrain is thought to be deliberate and intended to derail a simple reading of a conventional sonnet with questions of who is being referred to. The confusion begins with the phrase "to please him", which at first glance may seem to refer to the fair youth — a young man who appreciates flattery. That idea is supported in the rival poets group, where the poet appears to resist the young man's insistence on being flattered. The poet feels that his position in the young man's favor has been overthrown by rival poets, who have succeeded only because they flatter, whereas the poet prefers to write "in true plain words" (Sonnet 82, line 12). The sorting out of the ambiguities, causes the reader to consider a possible interpretation of the fair youth as a flattery-craving tyrant.

In line 12 of the quarto the word guil’st occurs. Some editors replace it with the word gildest, which is defined as: adorns with a thin layer of gold). This substitution was first made in an 18th Century edition of Shakespeare's works, edited by Edmond Malone. With this emendation the poet flatters the night by saying that even when "stars twire [peer and wink] not, thou gildest the even" (evening).

The final couplet (lines 13 & 14) makes it clear that the poet does not succeed in conjuring a vision of the young man, and the flattery, telling the day he is bright for example, does not satisfy the torturers, who appear to be stretching the poet on the rack — drawing his "sorrows longer", and making "grief’s length seem stronger” (lines 13-14).

== Sonnet Structure ==
Sonnet 28 is an English or Shakespearean sonnet. It consists of 14 lines arranged by the rhyme scheme to form three quatrains (lines 1–12) and a couplet (lines 13–14). The rhyme scheme is ABAB CDCD EFEF GG. It is written in iambic pentameter, a metre based on five feet in each line, with each foot containing two syllables accented weak/strong:

 ×   /   ×   /    ×   /     ×  /   ×    / 
But day by night and night by day oppressed, (28.4)

The two lines of the couplet, and perhaps lines ten and twelve, each has a final extra syllable or feminine ending:

 ×   /   ×    /  ×   /   ×  /  ×    / (×) 
But day doth daily draw my sorrows longer, (28.13)

/ = ictus, a metrically strong syllabic position. × = nonictus. (×) = extrametrical syllable.

Alliteration occurs in the sonnet, the b, d or p sounds for example, found in lines 1 through 3.
