= Sonnet 48 =

« » Sonnet 48
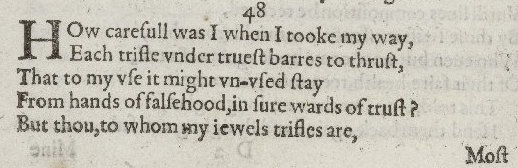
- The first five lines of Sonnet 48 in the 1609 Quarto
Q1
Q2
Q3
C
How careful was I, when I took my way,
Each trifle under truest bars to thrust,
That to my use it might unused stay
From hands of falsehood, in sure wards of trust!
But thou, to whom my jewels trifles are,
Most worthy comfort, now my greatest grief,
Thou, best of dearest and mine only care,
Art left the prey of every vulgar thief.
Thee have I not lock’d up in any chest,
Save where thou art not, though I feel thou art,
Within the gentle closure of my breast,
From whence at pleasure thou mayst come and part;
And even thence thou wilt be stol’n, I fear,
For truth proves thievish for a prize so dear.
—William Shakespeare
4
8
12
14

Sonnet 48 is one of 154 sonnets written by the English playwright and poet William Shakespeare. It is a member of the Fair Youth sequence, in which the poet expresses his love towards a young man.

== Structure ==
Sonnet 48 is an English or Shakespearean sonnet, a type of sonnet that contains three quatrains followed by a final rhyming couplet. It follows the form's typical rhyme scheme, ABAB CDCD EFEF GG, and is written in iambic pentameter based on five pairs of metrically weak/strong syllabic positions per line. The second line exemplifies a regular iambic pentameter:

×      / ×  /  ×    /×    /    ×    / 
Each trifle under truest bars to thrust, (48.2)

/ = ictus, a metrically strong syllabic position. × = nonictus.
