= Sonnet 45 =

« » Sonnet 45
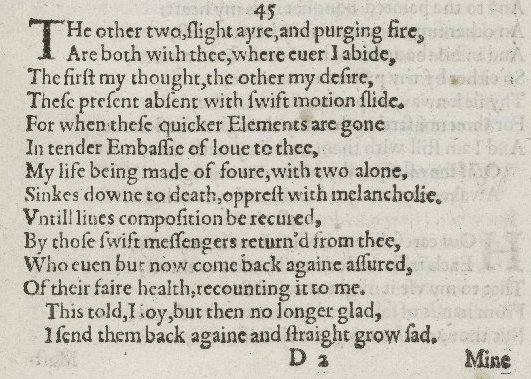
- Sonnet 45 in the 1609 Quarto
Q1
Q2
Q3
C
The other two, slight air and purging fire,
Are both with thee, wherever I abide;
The first my thought, the other my desire,
These present-absent with swift motion slide.
For when these quicker elements are gone
In tender embassy of love to thee,
My life, being made of four, with two alone
Sinks down to death, oppress’d with melancholy;
Until life’s composition be recured
By those swift messengers return’d from thee,
Who even but now come back again, assured
Of thy fair health, recounting it to me:
This told, I joy; but then no longer glad,
I send them back again, and straight grow sad.
—William Shakespeare
4
8
12
14

Sonnet 45 is one of 154 sonnets written by the English playwright and poet William Shakespeare. It is a member of the Fair Youth sequence, in which the poet expresses his love towards a young man. Sonnet 45 is continued from Sonnet 44.

== Structure ==
Sonnet 45 is an English or Shakespearean sonnet. The Shakespearean sonnet contains three quatrains followed by a final rhyming couplet. It follows the form's typical rhyme scheme, ABAB CDCD EFEF GG, and is written in a type of poetic metre called iambic pentameter based on five pairs of metrically weak/strong syllabic positions. The final line exemplifies a regular iambic pentameter:

×  /     ×   /   × /    ×      /       ×   / 
I send them back again, and straight grow sad. (45.14)

/ = ictus, a metrically strong syllabic position. × = nonictus.

The meter demands several contractions: one-syllable "being" in line 7 and "even" in line 11, and — somewhat controversially — a three-syllable "melancholy" (probably pronounced mel-an-ch'ly) in line 8.

== Recordings ==
- Paul Kelly, for the 2016 album, Seven Sonnets & a Song
