= Sonnet 24 =

Poem by William Shakespeare

« » Sonnet 24
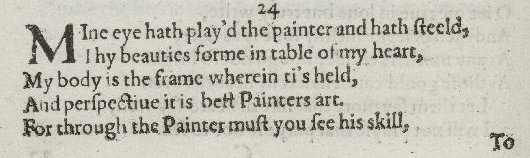
- The first five lines of Sonnet 24 in the 1609 Quarto
Q1
Q2
Q3
C
Mine eye hath play’d the painter and hath stell’d
Thy beauty’s form in table of my heart;
My body is the frame wherein ’tis held,
And perspective it is best painter’s art.
For through the painter must you see his skill,
To find where your true image pictur’d lies;
Which in my bosom’s shop is hanging still,
That hath his windows glazed with thine eyes.
Now see what good turns eyes for eyes have done:
Mine eyes have drawn thy shape, and thine for me
Are windows to my breast, where-through the sun
Delights to peep, to gaze therein on thee;
Yet eyes this cunning want to grace their art,
They draw but what they see, know not the heart.
—William Shakespeare
4
8
12
14

Sonnet 24 is one of 154 sonnets written by the English playwright and poet William Shakespeare, and is a part of the Fair Youth sequence.

In the sonnet, Shakespeare treats the commonplace Renaissance conceit connecting heart and eye. Although it relates to other sonnets that explore this theme, Sonnet 24 is considered largely imitative and conventional.

== Structure ==
Sonnet 24 is a typical English or Shakespearean sonnet. English sonnets contain fourteen lines, including three quatrains and a final couplet. It follows the typical rhyme scheme of the form ABAB CDCD EFEF GG, and is written in iambic pentameter, a type of poetic metre based on five pairs of metrically weak/strong syllabic positions per line. Line ten exemplifies a regular iambic pentameter:

 ×   /     ×     /     ×   /    ×     /    ×   / 
Mine eyes have drawn thy shape, and thine for me (24.10)

/ = ictus, a metrically strong syllabic position. × = nonictus.

The fourth line is regularized by the Elizabethan pronunciation of "pérspective".

== Source and analysis ==
Edward Capell amended quarto "steeld" to "stelled," a word more closely related to the metaphor of the first quatrain. Edward Dowden notes parallels for the opening conceit in Henry Constable's Diana and in Thomas Watson's Tears of Fancy.

The poem's central conceit, the dialogue between heart and eye, was a period cliché. Sidney Lee traces it to Petrarch and notes analogues in the work of Ronsard, Michael Drayton, and Barnabe Barnes.

The poem has not enjoyed a high reputation. Henry Charles Beeching speculates that it might be a half-serious spoof of a clichéd type of poem. George Wyndham is among the few to take it completely seriously, providing a neoplatonic reading.

"Perspective" is the key trope in the second half of the poem, as it introduces the idea of the connection between speaker and beloved. Some editors have assumed that "perspective" was used, as often in the Renaissance, to refer to a specific type of optical illusion sometimes called a perspective house; however, Thomas Tyler and others demonstrated that the word was also known in its modern sense during the time.

Sonnet 46 and Sonnet 47 also present the eyes of the speaker as a character in the poem. Note that in Sonnet 24 both the singular eye and the plural eyes are used for the eyes of the speaker, contrary to Sonnet 46 and Sonnet 47 where only the singular is used.

== Further references ==
- Baldwin, T. W. (1950). On the Literary Genetics of Shakspeare's Sonnets. University of Illinois Press, Urbana.
- Hubler, Edwin (1952). The Sense of Shakespeare's Sonnets. Princeton University Press, Princeton.
- Schoenfeldt, Michael (2007). The Sonnets: The Cambridge Companion to Shakespeare's Poetry. Patrick Cheney, Cambridge University Press, Cambridge.

First edition and facsimile

- Shakespeare, William (1609). Shake-speares Sonnets: Never Before Imprinted. London: Thomas Thorpe.
- Lee, Sidney, ed. (1905). Shakespeares Sonnets: Being a reproduction in facsimile of the first edition. Oxford: Clarendon Press. OCLC 458829162.

Variorum editions

- Alden, Raymond Macdonald, ed. (1916). The Sonnets of Shakespeare. Boston: Houghton Mifflin Harcourt. OCLC 234756.
- Rollins, Hyder Edward, ed. (1944). A New Variorum Edition of Shakespeare: The Sonnets [2 Volumes]. Philadelphia: J. B. Lippincott & Co. OCLC 6028485. — Volume I and Volume II at the Internet Archive

Modern critical editions

- Atkins, Carl D., ed. (2007). Shakespeare's Sonnets: With Three Hundred Years of Commentary. Madison: Fairleigh Dickinson University Press. ISBN 978-0-8386-4163-7. OCLC 86090499.
- Booth, Stephen, ed. (2000) [1st ed. 1977]. Shakespeare's Sonnets (Rev. ed.). New Haven: Yale Nota Bene. ISBN 0-300-01959-9. OCLC 2968040.
- Burrow, Colin, ed. (2002). The Complete Sonnets and Poems. The Oxford Shakespeare. Oxford: Oxford University Press. ISBN 978-0192819338. OCLC 48532938.
- Duncan-Jones, Katherine, ed. (2010) [1st ed. 1997]. Shakespeare's Sonnets. Arden Shakespeare, third series (Rev. ed.). London: Bloomsbury. ISBN 978-1-4080-1797-5. OCLC 755065951. — 1st edition at the Internet Archive
- Evans, G. Blakemore, ed. (1996). The Sonnets. The New Cambridge Shakespeare. Cambridge: Cambridge University Press. ISBN 978-0521294034. OCLC 32272082.
- Kerrigan, John, ed. (1995) [1st ed. 1986]. The Sonnets ; and, A Lover's Complaint. New Penguin Shakespeare (Rev. ed.). Penguin Books. ISBN 0-14-070732-8. OCLC 15018446.
- Mowat, Barbara A.; Werstine, Paul, eds. (2006). Shakespeare's Sonnets & Poems. Folger Shakespeare Library. New York: Washington Square Press. ISBN 978-0743273282. OCLC 64594469.
- Orgel, Stephen, ed. (2001). The Sonnets. The Pelican Shakespeare (Rev. ed.). New York: Penguin Books. ISBN 978-0140714531. OCLC 46683809.
- Vendler, Helen, ed. (1997). The Art of Shakespeare's Sonnets. Cambridge, Massachusetts: The Belknap Press of Harvard University Press. ISBN 0-674-63712-7. OCLC 36806589.
