= Richard Brody =

American film critic (born 1958)

- Born: January 22, 1958 (age 68); United States
- Education: Princeton University (BA)
- Occupation: Film critic
- Employer: The New Yorker (1999–present)
- Awards: Chevalier of the Ordre des Arts et des Lettres (2014)

Richard Brody (born January 22, 1958) is an American film critic, filmmaker, and author.

== Background ==
Brody grew up in Roslyn, New York. He is Jewish and has personally identified as an atheist. Brody attended Princeton University, receiving a BA in comparative literature in 1980. He first became interested in films after seeing Jean-Luc Godard's seminal French New Wave film Breathless during his first year at Princeton. In the early 1980s, after graduating from college, Brody briefly lived in Paris. He is the author of a biography of Godard. Brody has two children with his wife, Maja, who immigrated to the United States from Yugoslavia.

== Career ==
Before becoming a film critic, Brody worked as a researcher on documentaries and made an independent film, Liability Crisis, released in 1995. Since 1999 he has written for The New Yorker. In December 2014, Brody was made a Chevalier (Knight) in the Ordre des Arts et des Lettres for his contributions in popularizing French cinema in America.

=== Favorite films ===
Brody participated in the 2012 Sight & Sound critics' poll, where he listed as his ten favorite films the following:

- Gertrud (Denmark, 1964)
- The Great Dictator (US, 1940)
- Husbands (US, 1970)
- Journey to Italy (Italy, 1954)
- King Lear (US, 1987)
- The Last Laugh (Germany, 1924)
- Marnie (US, 1964)
- Playtime (France, 1967)
- The Rules of the Game (France, 1939)
- Shoah (France, 1985)

In the 2022 Sight & Sound critics' poll, four of the films selected remained the same:

- King Lear (US, 1987)
- Shoah (France, 1985)
- The Last Laugh (Germany, 1924)
- The Gold Rush (US, 1925)
- The Story of the Last Chrysanthemums (Japan, 1939)
- Citizen Kane (US, 1941)
- Playtime (France, 1967)
- Jeanne Dielman, 23 quai du Commerce, 1080 Bruxelles (Belgium-France, 1975)
- Faces (US, 1968)
- Daughters of the Dust (US, 1991)

=== Best films of the year ===
- 2007: The Darjeeling Limited
- 2008: Still Life
- 2009: Fantastic Mr. Fox
- 2010: Shutter Island
- 2011: The Future
- 2012: Holy Motors and Moonrise Kingdom
- 2013: To the Wonder and The Wolf of Wall Street
- 2014: The Grand Budapest Hotel
- 2015: Chi-Raq
- 2016: Little Sister
- 2017: Get Out
- 2018: Madeline's Madeline
- 2019: The Irishman
- 2020: Kajillionaire
- 2021: The French Dispatch
- 2022: Benediction
- 2023: Killers of the Flower Moon
- 2024: Nickel Boys
- 2025: Sinners

== Bibliography ==
- Brody, Richard (2008). Everything is cinema : the working life of Jean-Luc Godard. New York: Metropolitan Books.
- — (2010). Jean-Luc Godard, tout est cinéma: Biographie. Traduit de l'anglais (États-Unis) par Jean-Charles Provost. Paris: Presses de la Cité.
