= Sonnet 49 =

« » Sonnet 49
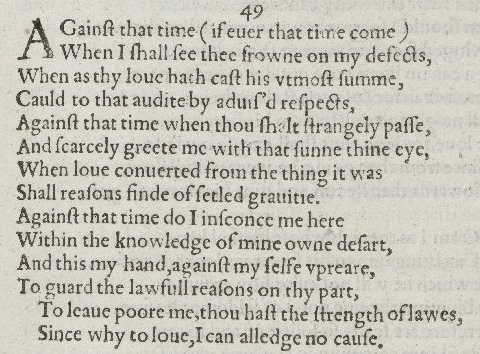
- Sonnet 49 in the 1609 Quarto
Q1
Q2
Q3
C
Against that time, if ever that time come,
When I shall see thee frown on my defects,
When as thy love hath cast his utmost sum,
Call’d to that audit by advis’d respects;
Against that time when thou shalt strangely pass,
And scarcely greet me with that sun, thine eye,
When love, converted from the thing it was,
Shall reasons find of settled gravity;
Against that time do I ensconce me here
Within the knowledge of mine own desert,
And this my hand against myself uprear,
To guard the lawful reasons on thy part:
To leave poor me thou hast the strength of laws,
Since why to love I can allege no cause.
—William Shakespeare
4
8
12
14

Sonnet 49 is one of 154 sonnets written by the English playwright and poet William Shakespeare. It is a member of the Fair Youth sequence, in which the poet expresses his love towards a young man.

== Structure ==
Sonnet 49 is an English or Shakespearean sonnet. The English sonnet contains three quatrains followed by a final rhyming couplet, for a total of fourteen lines. It follows the form's typical rhyme scheme, ABAB CDCD EFEF GG, and is written in iambic pentameter, a type of poetic metre based on five pairs of metrically weak/strong syllabic positions. Line thirteen exemplifies a regular iambic pentameter:

 ×  /     ×    /   ×   /     ×    /     ×   / 
To leave poor me thou hast the strength of laws, (49.13)

/ = ictus, a metrically strong syllabic position. × = nonictus.

Line ten's "desert" would have been for Shakespeare a full rhyme with "part", as is suggested by the Quarto's spelling, "desart".
