= Sonnet 50 =

« » Sonnet 50
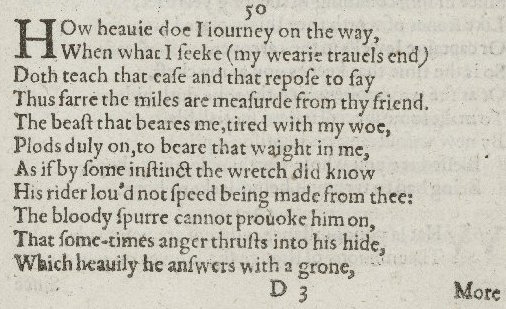
- The first eleven lines of Sonnet 50 in the 1609 Quarto
Q1
Q2
Q3
C
How heavy do I journey on the way,
When what I seek, my weary travel’s end,
Doth teach that ease and that repose to say,
“Thus far the miles are measur’d from thy friend!”
The beast that bears me, tired with my woe,
Plods dully on, to bear that weight in me,
As if by some instinct the wretch did know
His rider lov’d not speed, being made from thee:
The bloody spur cannot provoke him on
That sometimes anger thrusts into his hide;
Which heavily he answers with a groan,
More sharp to me than spurring to his side;
For that same groan doth put this in my mind;
My grief lies onward, and my joy behind.
—William Shakespeare
4
8
12
14

Sonnet 50 is one of 154 sonnets written by the English playwright and poet William Shakespeare. It is a member of the Fair Youth sequence, in which the poet expresses his love towards a young man. It is continued in Sonnet 51.

== Structure ==
Sonnet 50 is an English or Shakespearean sonnet, containing three quatrains followed by a final rhyming couplet. It follows the form's typical rhyme scheme, ABAB CDCD EFEF GG, and is written in iambic pentameter, a type of poetic metre based on five pairs of metrically weak/strong syllabic positions per line. The first line exemplifies a regular iambic pentameter:

 ×   /  ×  / ×  /   ×  /    ×  / 
How heavy do I journey on the way, (50.1)

/ = ictus, a metrically strong syllabic position. × = nonictus.

The meter demands some variant pronunciations of words. In line seven, the second syllable is stressed in "instínct". In line five "tired" is two syllables, and in line eight "being" is one.

== Interpretations ==
- Gemma Jones, for the 2002 compilation album, When Love Speaks (EMI)
