= Sonnet 46 =

« » Sonnet 46
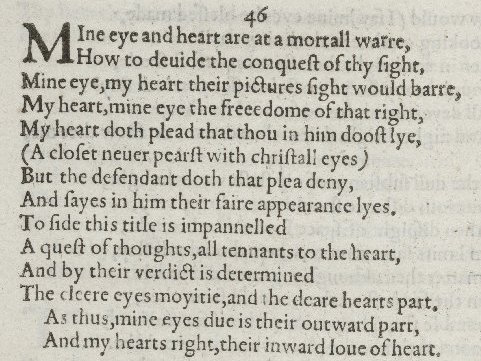
- Sonnet 46 in the 1609 Quarto
Q1
Q2
Q3
C
Mine eye and heart are at a mortal war,
How to divide the conquest of thy sight;
Mine eye my heart thy picture’s sight would bar,
My heart mine eye the freedom of that right.
My heart doth plead that thou in him dost lie,
A closet never pierc’d with crystal eyes,
But the defendant doth that plea deny,
And says in him thy fair appearance lies.
To ’cide this title is impanneled
A quest of thoughts, all tenants to the heart;
And by their verdict is determined
The clear eye’s moiety and the dear heart’s part:
As thus; mine eye’s due is thy outward part,
And my heart’s right thy inward love of heart.
—William Shakespeare
4
8
12
14

Sonnet 46 is one of 154 sonnets written by the English playwright and poet William Shakespeare. It is a member of the Fair Youth sequence, in which the poet expresses his love towards a young man. Sonnet 46 is continued in Sonnet 47.

== Synopsis of Sonnet 46 ==
According to the first two lines, the heart wants one thing (emotional love) and the eye wants something different (physical beauty). The third and fourth lines make it clear that while the eye is fixated on the physical appearance of the young man, the heart would prefer not to see the person's physical appearance. Instead, it would focus on emotional love. Lines five and six state that the young man who is the object of the poem resides inside the speaker's heart, where he is unseen by the "crystal eyes". The seventh and eighth lines state that the eyes disagree with the heart and argue that they are capable of detecting of the beauty of a person.

The third quatrain sets up the decision to be made about this 'battle'. Lines 9–10 explain that deciding this legal right of possession requires a jury of thoughts and these thoughts are all tenants of the heart. The jury decides the verdict and what share (moiety) the clear eye and dear heart will receive. The rhyming couplet offers the final decision. Author G. Blackmore Evans believes the 'outward part' refers to the external physical beauty; the eyes are granted the exercise of their physical attribute of sight. According to Evans, the 'right' of the heart perhaps suggests the 'natural right' making it a stronger word and emphasizing the superiority of the heart's claim: "'thy inward love of heart' is the spiritual/mental love of your heart and is a 'part' of you in value far beyond the 'due' accorded to the eyes because it is the 'essential' you, not merely the 'appearance'."

In both Sonnet 46 and Sonnet 47 the eye, as a party to the trial and to the truce is always used in the singular. The plural eyes is used in line 6 of Sonnet 46 and possibly (at least in the modern version of the text) in line 14 of Sonnet 47 but they do not refer there to the "defendant". In Sonnet 24 both singular and plural are used to refer to the eyes of the speaker.

== Structure ==
Sonnet 46 is an English or Shakespearean sonnet, composed of three quatrains followed by a final rhyming couplet, written in a type of metre called iambic pentameter based on five pairs of metrically weak/strong syllabic positions. The first line exemplifies a regular iambic pentameter:

 ×   /   ×    /    ×   /  ×  /  ×   / 
Mine eye and heart are at a mortal war, (46.1)

/ = ictus, a metrically strong syllabic position. × = nonictus.

While this sonnet (like others) is based on an ABAB CDCD EFEF GG rhyme scheme, here rhymes f and g are identical—which, as critic Philip C. McGuire writes, is unusual in an English sonnet. Moreover, not only are the same rhymes used, but identical words are employed ("heart" and "part" for both the f and g rhymes). Furthermore, the first quatrain rhymes "sight" with "right", and the "-t" sound at the end of each of these words is repeated in the third quatrain and couplet with “part” and "heart". McGuire suggests that the "blurring of formal divisions in sonnet 46 anticipates" the "league" that arises "betwixt mine eye and heart" in Sonnet 47. Sonnet 47 also includes the words "heart" and "part".

== Analysis ==
Sonnet 46, along with sonnets 24 and 47 (which are all sonnets referring to the eye and heart tension), is known as an absence sonnet. George Massey states that the sonnet has the look of a lover fondling the miniature of his beloved, and rejoicing that in her absence he has at least her portrait to dote on and dally with. The picture is not an actual portrait though, but rather a "visionary portrait of the Earl for the possession of which the eyes and heart contend." It is an image engraved in one's heart and conjures a mental picture. Author J.W. Lever agrees that the sonnets taken into this group employ the theme of the Poet's absence from his Friend. The subject-matter is traditional – conceits on the eyes and heart, laments at separation, accounts of the sleeplessness or troubled dreams of the beloved. Lever believes, "conceits on absence become instruments of investigating the workings of poetic thought, its power to transcend space, its visionary quality." The conceit was equally witty, and also worked to advance the poet's understanding of himself, derived not from ideal principles but from observation and intuition.

Because there is this apparent focus on the absent person, it seems logical that physical descriptions play into the remembrance of the absent. It is quite obvious that the body is the focus in this poem. There are 14 references to body parts (eye and heart). While the body was not an exploited object in Renaissance times, it was a focus of love nonetheless. Lever notes that it was commonplace of romance "entered through the eyes and penetrated to the heart." Furthermore, "Renaissance fancy…developed the conceit, with love engraving upon the heart the lady's image. The engraving became a portrait, with the eyes as windows through which it could be seen." In a time when courtship was more formal and suitors or lovers were viewed from afar, it makes sense that one would struggle with relying on the eye for physical knowledge of the other, but need the heart to fully read and connect to the person.

Shakespeare sets up the dispute between the heart and the eye as a legal battle that is to be decided by a jury ("quest of thoughts"). Legal terminology is abundant throughout the sonnet, with both the heart and eye making "pleas" for their cases. Eventually, a "verdict is determined" that the "outward part" of the body belongs to the eye while the "inward love of heart" belongs to the heart. Critic Paul Hammond focuses on the word "'cide" in line 9. He argues that neither "'cide" as in "decide" nor "side" as in "to support" or "to side with" make sense in the context of the poem. He states that the word was originally printed as "fide", which was a misprint of "finde", meaning "to determine and declare". He gives two reasons why he thinks this is the correct word: (1) "side" does not make sense in the context of the poem and (2) that "finde" continues the legal imagery of the sonnet.

Battle imagery is also rife throughout the sonnet. It describes a "mortal war" between the heart and the eye, with both striving for different aspects of a person and preventing the other from attaining what it desires. They clash over "how to divide the conquest of thy sight". In the end, the sonnet suggests that a truce must be made between the heart and the eye.

== Connections to Sonnet 47 ==
Sonnet 46 is strongly connected to Sonnet 47. The former raises the issue of the balance between the heart and the eyes, and the latter provides the resolution to this issue. As critic Joel Fineman writes, Sonnet 47 "rel[ies] on a verdict that is determined at the conclusion of Sonnet 46." While 46 focuses on the "war" between the heart and the eyes, 47 begins with the line "Betwixt mine eye and heart a league is took", suggesting that a truce has been made and the war has come to an end.

The third quatrain and couplet from Sonnet 47 emphasize the equality of heart and eye, suggesting that they are complementary. While they are different parts of the body with different desires, they both find "delight" in the same thing: the young man. Fineman writes that "the difference between outward and inward is secured and reconciled because the vision of the eye and the thinking of the heart can be harmoniously apportioned between the clear-cut opposition of the clear eye's moiety and the dear heart's part." In essence, they both want different parts of the same thing, and thus should function in harmony instead of in conflict.

Both Sonnets 46 and 47 use the idea of a picture to describe the physical appearance of the young man. Sonnet 46 states, "Mine eye my heart thy picture's sight would bar" while Sonnet 47 says, "With my love's picture then my eye doth feast".
