= Sonnet 52 =

« » Sonnet 52
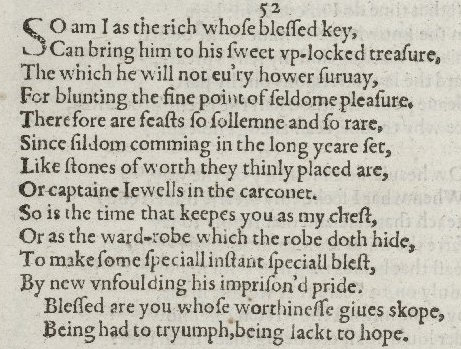
- Sonnet 52 in the 1609 Quarto
Q1
Q2
Q3
C
So am I as the rich, whose blessed key
Can bring him to his sweet up-locked treasure,
The which he will not every hour survey,
For blunting the fine point of seldom pleasure.
Therefore are feasts so solemn and so rare,
Since, seldom coming, in the long year set,
Like stones of worth they thinly placed are,
Or captain jewels in the carcanet.
So is the time that keeps you as my chest,
Or as the wardrobe which the robe doth hide,
To make some special instant special blest,
By new unfolding his imprison’d pride.
Blessed are you, whose worthiness gives scope,
Being had, to triumph, being lack’d, to hope.
—William Shakespeare
4
8
12
14

Sonnet 52 is one of 154 sonnets written by the English playwright and poet William Shakespeare. It is a member of the Fair Youth sequence, in which the poet expresses his love towards a young man.

== Structure ==
Sonnet 52 is an English or Shakespearean sonnet. It contains three quatrains followed by a final rhyming couplet. It follows the typical rhyme scheme of the English sonnet, ABAB CDCD EFEF GG, and is composed in iambic pentameter, a type of poetic metre based on five pairs of metrically weak/strong syllabic positions. The twelfth line exemplifies a regular iambic pentameter:

 ×  /  ×  /  ×    /  ×   / ×      / 
By new unfolding his imprison'd pride. (52.12)

The fourth line has a final extrametrical syllable or feminine ending (as does the second line). It also has its second ictus moved to the right (resulting in a four-position figure, × × / /, sometimes referred to as a minor ionic):

 ×    /  ×     ×  /    /    ×   /  ×    / (×) 
For blunting the fine point of seldom pleasure. (52.4)

/ = ictus, a metrically strong syllabic position. × = nonictus. (×) = extrametrical syllable.

The meter demands some variant pronunciations: the second line's "uplockèd", the seventh's "placèd", and the eighth's "jewels" all count as two syllables. In the fourteenth line, the first occurrence of "being" is one syllable, the second is two syllables.
