= Sonnet 44 =

« » Sonnet 44
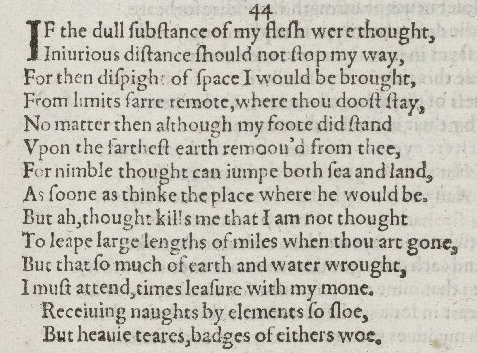
- Sonnet 44 in the 1609 Quarto
Q1
Q2
Q3
C
If the dull substance of my flesh were thought,
Injurious distance should not stop my way;
For then, despite of space, I would be brought,
From limits far remote, where thou dost stay.
No matter then although my foot did stand
Upon the farthest earth remov’d from thee;
For nimble thought can jump both sea and land,
As soon as think the place where he would be.
But, ah, thought kills me, that I am not thought,
To leap large lengths of miles when thou art gone,
But that, so much of earth and water wrought,
I must attend time’s leisure with my moan;
Receiving nought by elements so slow
But heavy tears, badges of either’s woe.
—William Shakespeare
4
8
12
14

Sonnet 44 is one of 154 sonnets written by the English playwright and poet William Shakespeare. It is a member of the Fair Youth sequence, in which the poet expresses his love towards a young man. Sonnet 44 is continued in Sonnet 45.

== Structure ==
Sonnet 44 is an English or Shakespearean sonnet, which contains three quatrains followed by a final rhyming couplet. It follows the typical rhyme scheme of the form, ABAB CDCD EFEF GG, and is written in iambic pentameter, a type of poetic metre based on five pairs of metrically weak/strong syllabic positions. The fifth line exemplifies a regular iambic pentameter:

 ×  /  ×    /  ×   /     ×  /    ×    / 
No matter then although my foot did stand (44.5)

/ = ictus, a metrically strong syllabic position. × = nonictus.

The sonnet is quite regular metrically (for example, a three-syllable "injurious" maintains regularity in line two), but implements a few variations, for example in the first and last lines:

 ×   ×  /    /   ×    /   ×   /    ×     / 
If the dull substance of my flesh were thought, (44.1)

 ×   /  ×  /      /  ×  ×  /   ×     / 
But heavy tears, badges of either's woe. (44.14)

...which contain, respectively, a rightward movement of the first ictus (resulting in a four-position figure, × × / /, sometimes referred to as a minor ionic), and a mid-line reversal ("badges").

== Criticism ==
Critics have mentioned Sonnet 44 is directly coupled to Sonnet 45 and lacks a definite conclusion.

== Recordings ==
- Poeterra, for the 2014 album, When in Disgrace
- Paul Kelly, for the 2016 album, Seven Sonnets & a Song
