= Viviane Forrester =

French author (1925–2013)

Viviane Forrester (29 September 1925, Paris – 30 April 2013) was an essayist, novelist, journalist and literary critic.

== Biography ==
Born Viviane Dreyfus in a French Jewish family, after wartime exile she married Simon Stoloff, with whom she had two sons. After they divorced, she married John Forrester - they separated after some years, but never divorced. She worked for Le Monde, Le Nouvel Observateur and Quinzaine littéraire and was a member of the jury of the Prix Femina. She became famous internationally with her books on Virginia Woolf (Prix Goncourt 2009) and on politics. In L'horreur économique and Une étrange dictature she criticized the globalisation of capitalism. These international bestsellers in particular attacked the free market dogma and the resulting alienation and misfortunes for the unemployed.

She was also a founding member of ATTAC.

Viviane Forrester died on Tuesday 30 April 2013.

== Awards ==
- In 1983, she won the Prix Femina de l'essai for her biography of Van Gogh and later became a member of the jury of the Prix Femina.
- In 1996 she won the Prix Médicis de l'essai in 1996 for L'horreur économique.
- In 2009 she won the Prix Goncourt de la Biographie in 2009 for her biography of Virginia Woolf.

== Works ==
- "The NS Essay - Work: the great illusion", The New Statesman, 24 May 1999
- Ainsi des exilés, Denoël, 1970
- Le Grand festin, Denoël, 1971
- Le corps entier de Marigda, Denoël, 1976
- Vestiges, Seuil, 1978
- La Violence du calme, Seuil, 1980
- Van Gogh ou l'enterrement dans les blés, Seuil, 1983, ISBN 978-2-02-006444-6
- Le Jeu des poignards, Gallimard, 1985
- L'Oeil de la nuit, Grasset, 1986
- Mains, Séguier, 1988, 1001 nuits, 1998
- Ce Soir, après la guerre, Lattès, 1992, Fayard, 1997
- L'horreur économique, Fayard: Centre d'Exportation du Livre Francais, 1996, ISBN 978-2-253-14601-8
  - The Economic Horror, Wiley-Blackwell, 1999, ISBN 978-0-7456-1994-1
- Une étrange dictature, Fayard, 2000
- Le Crime occidental, Fayard, 2004
- Mes Passions de toujours, Fayard, 2006
- Virginia Woolf, Albin Michel, 2009 (English trans., Jody Gladding.) [Columbia University Press,] 2015.
- Rue de Rivoli, Gallimard, 2011
- Dans la fureur glaciale, Gallimard, 2011
