= Sonnet 47 =

« » Sonnet 47
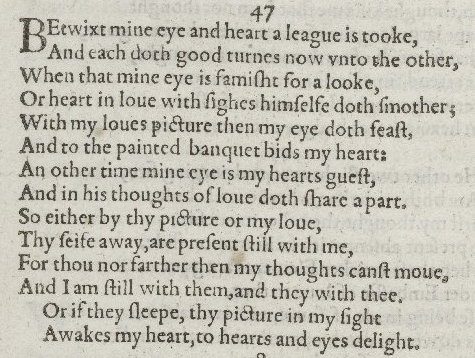
- Sonnet 47 in the 1609 Quarto
Q1
Q2
Q3
C
Betwixt mine eye and heart a league is took,
And each doth good turns now unto the other:
When that mine eye is famish’d for a look,
Or heart in love with sighs himself doth smother,
With my love’s picture then my eye doth feast
And to the painted banquet bids my heart;
Another time mine eye is my heart’s guest
And in his thoughts of love doth share a part:
So, either by thy picture or my love,
Thyself away art present still with me;
For thou not farther than my thoughts canst move,
And I am still with them and they with thee;
Or, if they sleep, thy picture in my sight
Awakes my heart to heart’s and eye’s delight.
—William Shakespeare
4
8
12
14

Shakespeare's Sonnet 47 is one of the Fair Youth sequence, addressed to a well-born young man. More locally, it is a thematic continuation of Sonnet 46.

== Paraphrase ==
My heart and my eye have reached a mutually beneficial understanding. When my eye yearns for the sight of my beloved, or when my heart is pining, then my eye shares the sight of my beloved (seen in a painting) with my heart. At other times, my heart will share with my eye (in imagination) some memory or thought of the beloved. So whether in painting or in imagination, you are always present with me. It is impossible for you to move outside the sphere of my thoughts; I am always with my thoughts, and they are always with you. Or, if my thoughts are, as it were, sleeping, then your painting will delight my eyes and thus awake my heart.

In both Sonnet 46 and Sonnet 47 the eye, as a party to the trial or to the truce is always used in the singular. The plural eyes is used in line 6 of Sonnet 46 and possibly (at least in the modern version of the text) in line 14 of Sonnet 47 but they do not refer there to the "defendant". In Sonnet 24 both singular and plural are used to refer to the eyes of the speaker.

== Structure ==
Sonnet 47 is an English or Shakespearean sonnet, which contains three quatrains followed by a final couplet for a total of fourteen lines. It follows the typical rhyme scheme of the form, ABAB CDCD EFEF GG, and is composed in iambic pentameter, a type of metre based on five pairs of metrically weak/strong syllabic positions per line. The final line exemplifies a regular iambic pentameter:

×   /   ×  /      ×  /      ×   /      × / 
Awakes my heart, to heart's and eyes' delight. (47.14)

Lines two and four contain a final extrametrical syllable or feminine ending.

×   /    ×   /    ×    /     ×  /    ×     / (×) 
Or heart in love with sighs himself doth smother, (47.4)

/ = ictus, a metrically strong syllabic position. × = nonictus. (×) = extrametrical syllable.

== Source and analysis ==
The sonnet thematically continues from the "verdict" delivered by the eye and heart in the previous sonnet. Kerrigan perceives an allusion to the story of Zeuxis and Parrhasius in the "painted banquet" of line 8. Comparing the same image to similar passages in The Faerie Queene, Booth regards the image as symbolic of coldness and insufficiency. Sidney Lee suggests that the conceit of the poem inspired a passage in John Suckling's Tragedy of Benneralt. Edmond Malone notes that the figure of line 3 appears also in The Comedy of Errors; Edward Dowden notes parallels to Sonnet 75.
