= Tom Luddy =

American film producer (1943–2023)

- Born: Thomas William Luddy; June 4, 1943; New York City, U.S.
- Died: February 13, 2023 (aged 79); Berkeley, California, U.S.
- Education: University of California, Berkeley (BA)
- Occupation: Film producer
- Years active: 1980–2008
- Spouse: Monique Montgomery

Thomas William Luddy (June 4, 1943 – February 13, 2023) was an American film producer and the co-founder of the Telluride Film Festival. He has a longtime association with the production company American Zoetrope. He has been a member of the jury at the 11th Moscow International Film Festival, the 38th Berlin International Film Festival and the 1993 Cannes Film Festival.

== Background and work ==
Luddy was born in New York City and raised in the suburb of White Plains, New York. He moved to California to attend the University of California, Berkeley, where he studied English and became involved in political activism and the local film community.

In the 1970s, Luddy organized screenings for the Pacific Film Archive at Berkeley, with a particular focus in bringing foreign films to the United States. To promote these screenings, Luddy hired David Lance Goines to design and print a series of posters unique to each film. He also produced films, frequently for American Zoetrope. He partially funded Mishima: A Life in Four Chapters on his personal credit card.

In 1974, Luddy and a group of friends founded the Telluride Film Festival, envisioning it to be an event without the extensive media presence of other festivals, and screening a variety of new and old titles.

== Personal life and death ==
Luddy was married to the former Monique Montgomery. He died from complications of Parkinson's disease at his home in Berkeley on February 13, 2023, at the age of 79.

== Filmography ==
- Werner Herzog Eats His Shoe (1980) - associate producer
- Mishima: A Life in Four Chapters (1985) - producer
- Barfly - producer
- King Lear (1987) - associate producer (uncredited)
- Tough Guys Don't Dance (1987) - executive producer
- Manifesto (1988) - executive producer
- Powaqqatsi (1988) - associate producer
- Wait Until Spring, Bandini (1989) - producer
- Wind (1992) - producer
- The Secret Garden (1993) - producer
- My Family (1995) - executive producer
- Sworn to the Drum: A Tribute to Francisco Aguabella (1995) - producer
- Lani Loa – The Passage (1998) - executive producer
- Cachao: Uno Mas (2008) - producer
