= Peter S. Donaldson =

American Shakespearean scholar

Academic background
- Education: Columbia University (BA, PhD); University of Cambridge (BA)

Academic work
- Discipline: Shakespearean studies
- Institutions: Massachusetts Institute of Technology

Peter S. Donaldson is an American Shakespeare scholar. He is the Ford International Professor in the Humanities and Professor of Literature at Massachusetts Institute of Technology.

== Biography ==
Donaldson grew up in Levittown, New York. He won a placement in the Columbia University Science Honors Program as a high school student and received his B.A. from Columbia University, where started in the sciences but switched to literature. He won a Kellett Fellowship to study at the University of Cambridge, before receiving his Ph.D. from Columbia. His graduate research led to the publication of Machiavelli and Mystery of State (1988).

Donaldson's research has focused on Shakespeare across media, including print, film, and multimedia adaptations of Shakespeare's body of works.

Donaldson is a Fellow of the Royal Historical Society. He is the inaugural Lloyd Davis Distinguished Visiting Professor of Shakespeare Studies at the University of Queensland and held the inaugural Ann Fetter Friedlander Professorship at MIT. He is also the Director of the MIT Shakespeare Electronic Archive.
