= Sonnet 33 =

« » Sonnet 33
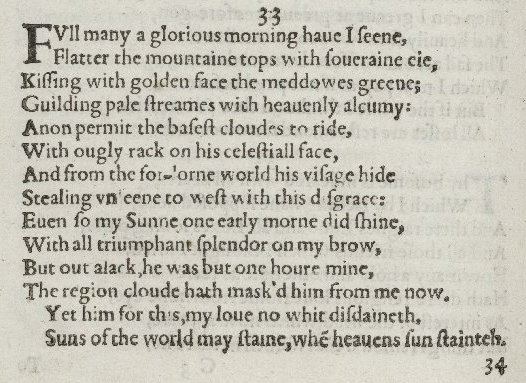
- Sonnet 33 in the 1609 Quarto
Q1
Q2
Q3
C
Full many a glorious morning have I seen
Flatter the mountain-tops with sovereign eye,
Kissing with golden face the meadows green,
Gilding pale streams with heavenly alchemy;
Anon permit the basest clouds to ride
With ugly rack on his celestial face,
And from the forlorn world his visage hide,
Stealing unseen to west with this disgrace:
Even so my sun one early morn did shine
With all-triumphant splendor on my brow;
But, out, alack! he was but one hour mine,
The region cloud hath mask’d him from me now.
Yet him for this my love no whit disdaineth;
Suns of the world may stain when heaven’s sun staineth.
—William Shakespeare
4
8
12
14

Shakespeare's Sonnet 33 is one of 154 sonnets written by the English playwright and poet William Shakespeare. It is a member of the Fair Youth sequence, in which the poet expresses his love towards a young man. This sonnet is the first of what are sometimes called the estrangement sonnets, numbers 33–36: poems concerned with the speaker's response to an unspecified "sensual fault" mentioned in (35) committed by his beloved.

== Context ==
Nicolaus Delius notes thematic and stylistic parallels to the last scene of The Two Gentlemen of Verona. George Steevens and Edward Dowden were among the first to group the so-called "estrangement sonnets" and to note the parallels to other groups (such as sonnets 40, 41, and 42) with similar themes.

This sonnet is viewed by T. R. Price as representing "the highest lyrical expression that English poetry has achieved". This is displayed in the power of using the beauty of nature as the symbol of human emotion. Samuel Taylor Coleridge instances the opening of this sonnet as characteristic of Shakespeare's imaginative style, by which he "gives a dignity and a passion to the objects which he presents. Unaided by any previous excitement, they burst upon us at once in life and in power." According to Gerrold Hammond, the single sentence octave, the first two quatrains, presents the reader with the strong poetic nature by using adjective plus noun structures on every line. The order and abundance makes the reader aware of the rhetoric.

Sonnet 33 is the first to introduce the idealizing metaphor of the young man as the sun. The sonnet and the ones that follow have been especially attractive to critics interested in biographical reference in the sonnet; George Wyndham deplores this tendency, as does Stephen Booth. Hammond critiques that the experience of reading this sonnet is almost to fall into collusion with the poet, "for everything about it, from its poetic and syntactic structures to its use of metaphor and pun, invites acceptance." M. P. Tilley describes the sonnet as playing on the proverb 'the morning sun never lasts the day'. Hilton Landry notes that the poem is an extended simile with metaphors in each branch of the simile; he also called it the "simplest and sweetest" of the group. Elizabeth Sagaser notes that the poem is counterposed to Sonnet 116, stating that the ideas of some sonnets are neutralized temporarily by others.

The tone in Sonnet 33 is one of reproach with movement toward a feeling of the necessity for separation seen in 36. The young man, betraying himself, betrayed also their shared world, the light in which they both move. The identification of their mutual life with the life of nature was complete; guilt of the friend was both their guilt and the guilt of life itself. It also puts across the idea that the poem with its shifts and changes offers not information about the mutability of the human condition, but rather participation in an actual experience of mutability. The speaker compares the delusion of the permanence of his friendship with the mountain tops 'flattered' by the rising sun.

In this sonnet (1) there is no overt "you" or "thou" (contrary to most of the sonnets and in particular to sonnets 34, 35 and 36 which all three use "thou") and (2) there is no mention of the supposed "fault" committed by the addressee towards the poet (as in sonnets 34 and 35) nor of the supposed "guilt" borne by the poet which may affect the addressee's reputation (as in sonnet 36).

== Structure ==
Sonnet 33 is a typical English or Shakespearean sonnet, composed of three quatrains followed by a final couplet. Its rhyme scheme, ABAB CDCD EFEF GG, is typical for the form. Like other Shakespearean sonnets, it is written in iambic pentameter, a type of poetic metre based on five pairs of metrically weak/strong syllabic positions. A regular example is:

× /   ×  /    ×  / ×     /     ×  / 
Anon permit the basest clouds to ride (33.5)

The lines of the couplet have a final extrametrical syllable or feminine ending. Lines two, three, four, eight, and fourteen all begin with an initial reversal.

 /   ×    ×  /     ×    /     ×   /        ×    / (×) 
Suns of the world may stain when heaven's sun staineth. (33.14)

/ = ictus, a metrically strong syllabic position. × = nonictus. (×) = extrametrical syllable.

== Analysis ==
=== Quatrain 1 and 2 ===
These two quatrains, being one sentence, are best analyzed together. In the 8 lines of quatrains 1 and 2, the patterned adjectives "help construct not an elaborate but an elegant metaphor of the sun as a noble countenance, normally given to blessing by his blaze and kiss but often obscured by base elements".

In the first quatrain, the narrator is comparing the young man of his interest with the beauty of nature, specifically the sun and meadows. The sun makes the mountains look beautiful, and the meadows and streams are glittering in a way that only heavenly magic can do. In the second line, Kathryn Duncan-Jones points out the reversal of the traditions of courtly love roles suggested most often. Courtiers flatter the sovereigns, but this sovereign, a sun/son, flatters (deceives) inferiors.

The second quatrain describes the young man's relationship with the poet. We can see here that there may be a moral or internal struggle for the narrator because the young man does not have loyalty towards only one person. The speaker is torn between hating the clouds and hating the young man who will "permit" the damage they (the clouds) cause and hurt the speaker's feelings. Guilt is transferred, not to another human being, but to a force of nature to blame for the young man's misdeeds for being promiscuous or disloyal to the speaker. The speaker is using the sun as a metaphor emphasizes its guilt and problem of the "friend". Phrases and words like, "basest clouds", "ugly rack", "stealing", and "disgrace" in the second quatrain show the readers how the poet is feeling towards the young man's promiscuity. It also shows that a serious moral lapse has occurred.

The poem's conceit has numerous parallels in Shakespeare's plays. Sidney Lee compares "flatter" (line 2) to a similar usage in King John 3.1.77-80. Steevens, Edward Capell, and Henry Brown note parallels in other plays. Edmond Malone glosses "rack" (line 6) as "the quick motion of the clouds"; "region" (10), a term for a division of the atmosphere, echoes and amplifies the reference. Rolfe notes that "forlorn" (line 7) was in Elizabethan pronunciation with the accent on the first syllable when it follows an unaccented syllable.

=== Quatrain 3 ===
Although Sonnet 33 is considered a part of the group of Shakespearean sonnets addressed to a young man, there have been claims that the third quatrain of sonnet 33 may have been co-addressed to Shakespere's only son, Hamnet, who died in 1596 at the age of 11. As noted by Mark Schwartzberg of New York University, Shakespearean biographer Anthony Holden suggests that the death of Hamnet was "one of the catalysts that sparked the change to a darker tone in his [Shakespeare's] work, a tone that increasingly reflected personal grief". This change in tone is found in Hamlet, The Winter's Tale, and King John, which contained several, unexpected emotional moments.

According to Scwhartzberg, the sense of betrayal and disappointment that permeates throughout the poem from the speaker isn't necessarily directed at the fair, young youth that this sonnet is thought to be addressed to, but rather at God or Fate for taking the life of Hamnet too soon. Schwartzberg believes that there is a pun on the word sun which, when replaced with son, provides the poem a tone of grievous loss. "Even so my sun one early morn did shine" (9) may be in reference to the brevity of Shakespeare's own son; "one early morn" being the phrase that captures this notion. This line combined with line 11 and 12 respectively, "But out alack, he was but one hour mine, / The region cloud hath mask'd him from me now" demonstrates Shakespeare's grief over the loss of his son as a father who felt like the existence of his son's life was but "one hour".

Michael Wood also suggests the allusion of the third quatrain of Sonnet 33 to the death of the poet's son with an implied pun on "sun". In In Search of Shakespeare, he suggests that this sonnet might have nothing to do with the so-called Fair Youth sonnets, that it alludes to the death of the poet's son, Hamnet in 1596 at age 11, and that there is an implied pun on "sun" and "son": "Even so my sun one early morn did shine, with all triumphant splendour on my brow; but out, alack, he was but one hour mine, the region cloud hath mask'd him from me now". If this is the case the link of this sonnet with sonnets 34, 35 and 36 would be entirely coincidental and spurious.

Kerverne Smith believes that the emotional effect that Hamnet's death had on Shakespeare resulted in recurring features found in Shakespeare's later plays, which fit into one of five motifs: "the resurrected child or sibling, androgynous and twin-like figures, a growing emphasis on father-daughter relationships; paternal guilt; family division and reunion". If this notion is to be true, then sonnet 33 could be that of the "paternal guilt" motif.

In other readings of the third quatrain, it should complete the metaphor of the young man as a sun, but fails to commit, "my sun" being a step removed from "my friend" or "my love". This requires the reader to allow the speaker some leeway toward the metaphor, not to search to deeply into the "nature of the region cloud or its masking". The third quatrain restates the first two quatrains in the same metaphoric terms.

=== Couplet ===
According to Collin Barrow, the context implies that the speaker must 'allow others to dim their brightness', that he must allow for faults in his friend. The innocent weather that clouds the sun at the start of the poem has turned into moral stain, in which the sun itself (and by implication the friend) plays its part. Only when the end of the line is reached does it become apparent that the poet's comparison of his friend as 'my sun' has become a pun and slur, describing him "as 'a son of the world', a morally corrupt worldling, not a divine being". The friend's stain also stains the speaker and injures him irreversibly. Hammond considers the pun on 'sun' and 'stain' to be a superficial wit, the final line an excuse for the friend's crime. Hammond refers to the excuse as lame "were it not for the metaphorical dress."

The couplet offers resistance to the reader. The reader wants something like "I thought out love an everlasting day / And yet my trust thou didst, my love, betray." These lines fit the spirit of the poem. Reading the sonnet with the couplet that Shakespeare wrote leaves the reader uncomfortable. Heather Dubrow claims the speaker is trying to fool himself; he accepts a one moral from the metaphor, that the friend's betrayal is justified by the sun, and neglects the moral the reader has been observing, the friend, like the sun, has been deceptive.

== Additional sources ==
- Baldwin, T. W. (1950). On the Literary Genetics of Shakspeare's Sonnets. University of Illinois Press, Urbana.
- Hubler, Edwin (1952). The Sense of Shakespeare's Sonnets. Princeton University Press, Princeton.
- Schoenfeldt, Michael (2007). The Sonnets: The Cambridge Companion to Shakespeare's Poetry. Patrick Cheney, Cambridge University Press, Cambridge.

First edition and facsimile

- Shakespeare, William (1609). Shake-speares Sonnets: Never Before Imprinted. London: Thomas Thorpe.
- Lee, Sidney, ed. (1905). Shakespeares Sonnets: Being a reproduction in facsimile of the first edition. Oxford: Clarendon Press. OCLC 458829162.

Variorum editions

- Alden, Raymond Macdonald, ed. (1916). The Sonnets of Shakespeare. Boston: Houghton Mifflin Harcourt. OCLC 234756.
- Rollins, Hyder Edward, ed. (1944). A New Variorum Edition of Shakespeare: The Sonnets [2 Volumes]. Philadelphia: J. B. Lippincott & Co. OCLC 6028485. — Volume I and Volume II at the Internet Archive

Modern critical editions

- Atkins, Carl D., ed. (2007). Shakespeare's Sonnets: With Three Hundred Years of Commentary. Madison: Fairleigh Dickinson University Press. ISBN 978-0-8386-4163-7. OCLC 86090499.
- Booth, Stephen, ed. (2000) [1st ed. 1977]. Shakespeare's Sonnets (Rev. ed.). New Haven: Yale Nota Bene. ISBN 0-300-01959-9. OCLC 2968040.
- Burrow, Colin, ed. (2002). The Complete Sonnets and Poems. The Oxford Shakespeare. Oxford: Oxford University Press. ISBN 978-0192819338. OCLC 48532938.
- Duncan-Jones, Katherine, ed. (2010) [1st ed. 1997]. Shakespeare's Sonnets. Arden Shakespeare, third series (Rev. ed.). London: Bloomsbury. ISBN 978-1-4080-1797-5. OCLC 755065951. — 1st edition at the Internet Archive
- Evans, G. Blakemore, ed. (1996). The Sonnets. The New Cambridge Shakespeare. Cambridge: Cambridge University Press. ISBN 978-0521294034. OCLC 32272082.
- Kerrigan, John, ed. (1995) [1st ed. 1986]. The Sonnets ; and, A Lover's Complaint. New Penguin Shakespeare (Rev. ed.). Penguin Books. ISBN 0-14-070732-8. OCLC 15018446.
- Mowat, Barbara A.; Werstine, Paul, eds. (2006). Shakespeare's Sonnets & Poems. Folger Shakespeare Library. New York: Washington Square Press. ISBN 978-0743273282. OCLC 64594469.
- Orgel, Stephen, ed. (2001). The Sonnets. The Pelican Shakespeare (Rev. ed.). New York: Penguin Books. ISBN 978-0140714531. OCLC 46683809.
- Vendler, Helen, ed. (1997). The Art of Shakespeare's Sonnets. Cambridge, Massachusetts: The Belknap Press of Harvard University Press. ISBN 0-674-63712-7. OCLC 36806589.
