= Sonnet 34 =

« » Sonnet 34
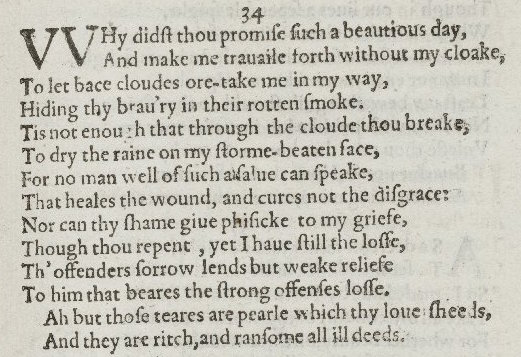
- Sonnet 34 in the 1609 Quarto
Q1
Q2
Q3
C
Why didst thou promise such a beauteous day
And make me travail forth without my cloak,
To let base clouds o’ertake me in my way,
Hiding thy brav'ry in their rotten smoke?
’Tis not enough that through the cloud thou break,
To dry the rain on my storm-beaten face,
For no man well of such a salve can speak
That heals the wound and cures not the disgrace;
Nor can thy shame give physic to my grief;
Though thou repent, yet I have still the loss;
Th'offender’s sorrow lends but weak relief
To him that bears the strong offence’s loss.
Ah, but those tears are pearl which thy love sheds,
And they are rich, and ransom all ill deeds.
—William Shakespeare
4
8
12
14

Shakespeare's Sonnet 34 is included in what is referred to as the Fair Youth sequence, and it is the second of a briefer sequence (Sonnet 33 through Sonnet 36) concerned with a betrayal of the poet committed by the young man, who is addressed as a personification of the sun.

== Structure ==
Sonnet 34 is an English or Shakespearean sonnet, composed of three quatrains and a final couplet. It follows the form's typical rhyme scheme: ABAB CDCD EFEF GG. It is written in iambic pentameter, a type of poetic metre based on five pairs of metrically weak/strong syllabic positions. Line 12 exemplifies a regular iambic pentameter:

 ×  /    ×   /      ×    /   ×  /  ×     / 
To him that bears the strong offence's loss.

/ = ictus, a metrically strong syllabic position. × = nonictus.

It is possible that for Shakespeare the couplet embodied a true rhyme (as indicated by the Quarto spelling: sheeds/deeds) even though seemingly the singular shed would not have made a true rhyme with deed.

== Source and analysis ==
Following Horace Davis, Stephen Booth notes the similarity of this poem in theme and imagery to Sonnet 120. Gerald Massey finds an analogue to lines 7–8 in The Faerie Queene, 2.1.20.

In 1768, Edward Capell altered line ten by replacing the word "loss" with the word "cross". This alteration was followed by Edmond Malone in 1783, and was generally accepted in the 19th and 20th Centuries. More recent editors do not favor this as a speculation that introduces a metaphor of the young man as a Christ figure, something that Shakespeare did not do here or elsewhere; the idea, as it would be portrayed by the young man in the context of this sonnet, does not fit well with Gospel accounts. Booth considers that the repetition of the word suggests the persistence of "loss".

== Interpretations ==
- Robert Lindsay, for the 2002 compilation album, When Love Speaks (EMI Classics)
