= Sonnet 30 =

« » Sonnet 30
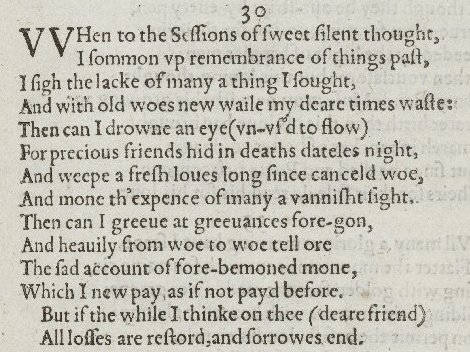
- Sonnet 30 in the 1609 Quarto
Q1
Q2
Q3
C
When to the sessions of sweet silent thought
I summon up remembrance of things past,
I sigh the lack of many a thing I sought,
And with old woes new wail my dear time’s waste:
Then can I drown an eye, unus’d to flow,
For precious friends hid in death’s dateless night,
And weep afresh love’s long since cancell’d woe,
And moan the expense of many a vanish’d sight:
Then can I grieve at grievances foregone,
And heavily from woe to woe tell o’er
The sad account of fore-bemoaned moan,
Which I new pay as if not paid before.
But if the while I think on thee, dear friend,
All losses are restor’d and sorrows end.
—William Shakespeare
4
8
12
14

Sonnet 30 is one of the 154 sonnets written by the English poet and playwright William Shakespeare. It was published in the Quarto in 1609. It is also part of the Fair Youth portion of the Shakespeare Sonnet collection where he writes about his affection for an unknown young man. While it is not known exactly when Sonnet 30 was written, most scholars agree that it was written between 1595 and 1600. It is written in Shakespearean form, comprising fourteen lines of iambic pentameter, divided into three quatrains and a couplet.

Within the sonnet, the narrator spends time remembering and reflecting on sad memories of a dear friend. He grieves of his shortcomings and failures, while also remembering happier memories. The narrator uses legal metaphors throughout the sonnet to describe the sadness that he feels as he reflects on his life. Then in the final couplet, the narrator changes his tone about the failures, as if the losses are now merely gains for himself.

== Summary ==
Sonnet 30 starts with Shakespeare mulling over his past failings and sufferings, including his dead friends and that he feels that he hasn't done anything useful. But in the final couplet Shakespeare comments on how thinking about his friend helps him to recover all of the things that he's lost, and it allows him stop mourning over all that has happened in the past.

== Context ==
Sonnet 30 is among the first group of sonnets (1-126), which are thought to concern a fair young man. The young man, as mentioned in some of Shakespeare's other sonnets, is described as being a good-looking young man who is gentle, and seems to possess a never ending supply of virtues. Some view Shakespeare's relationship with the young man as a homosexual one. However, it is also possible that Shakespeare's sonnets regarding the fair young man are simply meant to display male friendship above that of romantic love between man and woman. The original volume of 1609 is dedicated (by the publisher) to a "Mr. W. H." who some identify with the fair young man. Some candidates for Mr. W.H. are: William Shakespeare, William Hammond, William Houghton, Henry Walker, William Hewes, William Herbert, William Hathaway, and (with initials reversed) Henry Wriothesley.

== Structure ==
Sonnet 30 follows (as do almost all of the 154 sonnets of Shakespeare's collection) the Shakespearean Sonnet form, based on the 'English' or 'Surreyan' sonnet. These sonnets are made up of fourteen lines in three quatrains and a couplet, with the rhyme scheme ABAB CDCD EFEF GG.

While using the rhyming and metrical structure of the 'English' or 'Surreyan' sonnet, Shakespeare often also reflected the rhetorical form of the Italian form also known as the Petrarchan sonnet. It divides the sonnet into two parts: the octet (the first eight lines) usually states and develops the subject, while the sestet (the last six lines) winds up to a climax. Thus a change in emphasis, known as the volta, occurs between the end of the eighth and the beginning of the ninth lines — between the octet and sestet. A strong pause at the close of each quatrain is usual for Shakespeare. While he suggests Petrarchan form by placing the chief pause after the eighth line in about 27 or so of the sonnets, in over two thirds of his sonnets he places the chief pause after the twelfth line instead.

Iambic pentameter is used in almost all the sonnets, as it is here. This is a metre based on five pairs of metrically weak/strong syllabic positions. Occurring after much metrical tension throughout the quatrains, the couplet exhibits a quite regular iambic pentameter pattern:

 ×  /    ×   /   ×   /   ×    /    ×     / 
But if the while I think on thee, dear friend,

×    /  ×  /    ×  /    ×    /  ×   / 
All losses are restored and sorrows end. (30.13-14)

/ = ictus, a metrically strong syllabic position. × = nonictus.

The first line is a frequent target for metrists, possibly because of the ease with which the initial triple rhythm can be carried right through the line, producing this unmetrical reading:

  /   ×   ×  /  ×    ×    /    × ×     / 
When to the sessions of sweet silent thought (30.1)

Differences in scansion, however, tend to be conditioned more by metrists' theoretical preconceptions than by differences in how they hear the line. Most interpretations start with the assumption that the syllables in the sequence "-ions of sweet si-" increase in stress or emphasis thus:

                1    2    3    4
When to the sessions of sweet silent thought

1 = least stress or emphasis, and 4 = most.

Metrists who are most committed to the concept of metrical feet (for example Yvor Winters, W. K. Wimsatt, and Susanne Woods ) tend to find a "light" iamb followed by a "heavy" iamb:

                1    2    3    4
  /   ×   ×  /  ×    /    ×    / ×     / 
When to the sessions of sweet silent thought

Metrists with a slightly more flexible conception of feet may find either a pyrrhic followed by a spondee, or the four-position minor ionic replacing two iambs. Metrists rejecting feet may find an ictus moving to the right. Graphically, these stances add up to more or less the same thing:

                1    2    3    4
  /   ×   ×  /  ×    ×    /    / ×     / 
When to the sessions of sweet silent thought

== Exegesis ==
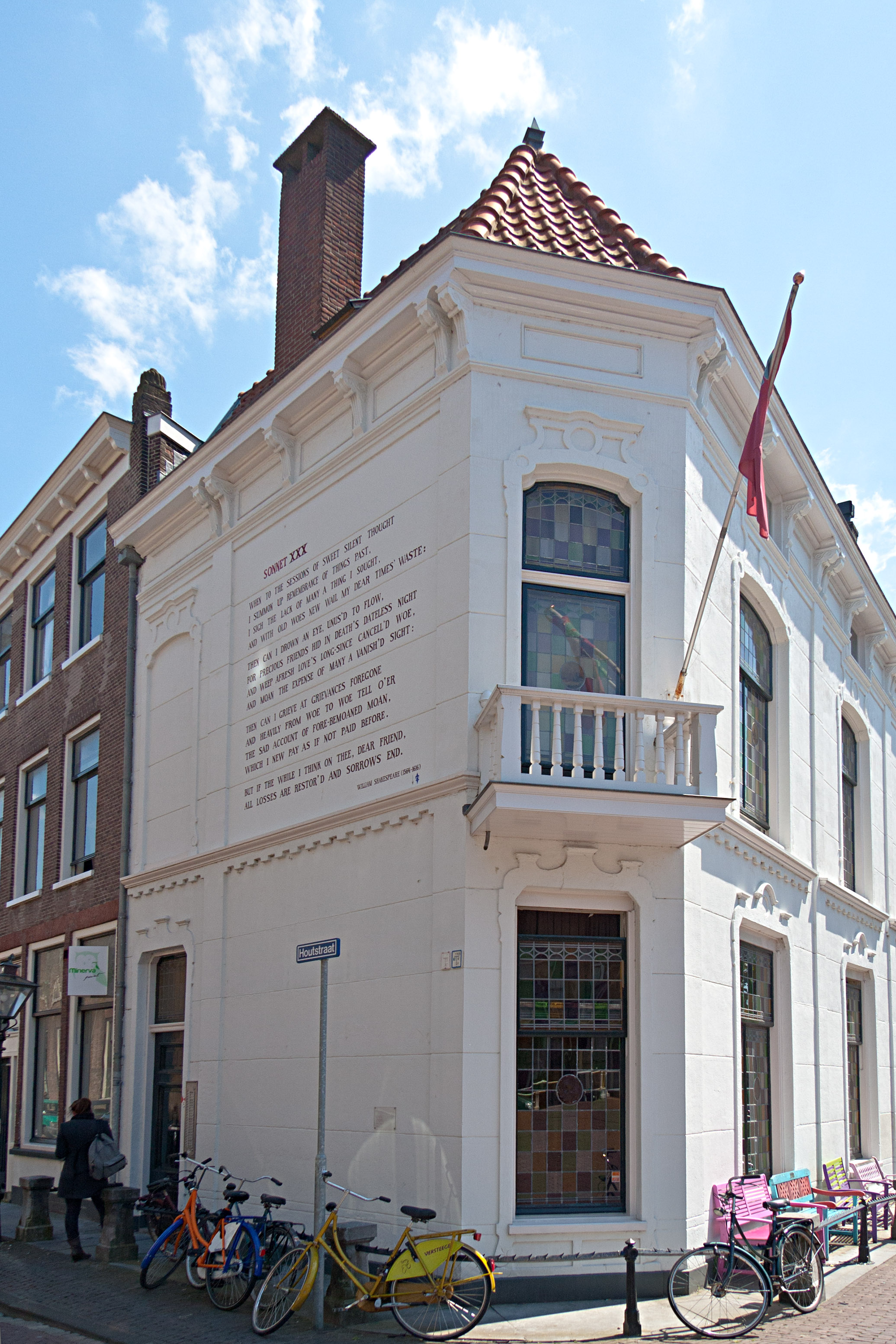
Sonnet XXX on a Leiden wall

=== Overview ===
The poem opens up with the speaker remembering his past losses. The narrator grieves his failures and shortcomings while also focusing on the subject of lost friends and lost lovers. Within the words of the sonnet, the narrator uses legal and financial language. He uses words such as: "sessions", "summon", "dateless", and many other legal terms. It's as if the narrator is taking meticulous accounts of his own grief and adds an unhealthy dose of guilt to the proceedings. The poem remains abstract as the process of remembering becomes the drama. About halfway through the sonnet, the speaker changes the tone, instead ending with a joyous tone as if reminiscing about the dear friend produces restoration and gain, not loss.

=== Quatrain 1 ===
In the first line the phrase "sessions of sweet silent thought" introduces the concept of Shakespeare remembering past events. Stephen Booth mentions that the word "sessions" refers to judges sitting in a court of law. Booth also notes that in line two the word "summon" is also a court term, which means to be called upon by the court or some authority to either provide evidence or answer a charge. It also means to call a certain quality into action –such as Shakespeare calling his memories to his mind. Helen Vendler also notes that there is slight pause in the phrase "sessions of sweet silent thought", because Shakespeare's thoughts eventually become painful rather than "sweet". Finally, the third and fourth lines refer to Shakespeare's regrets. In the third line, Booth says the word "sigh" means "lament".

=== Quatrain 2 ===
Starting on line five of the sonnet, the narrator speaks about not being able to fully reminiscence about his friends using his own eyes. He then recounts that friends of his are long gone within "death's dateless night," using the term dateless as time without limit. It does not mean that these friends are necessarily dead, they are just hidden in night, basically a night that will never end. Don Patterson also describes the statement "death's dateless night" as a more legalese and also a chilling phrase. Further into the quatrain the narrator uses the term cancelled to describe the relationship with past friends, as if the time with them have expired. As if everything in his past has expired or been lost. "Moan the expense" is also used to express the narrator's moaning over what the loss of "precious friends" and how is costs him in sorrow.

=== Quatrain 3 ===
In line 9, Shakespeare mourns over his past hardships and sorrows. The lines "from woe to woe tell over" suggest a kind of metaphor in which Shakespeare's woes and failings are like an account book that he reads through over and over. The word "heavily" before these lines also suggests that Shakespeare's reads this "account book" in a painful manner. Finally, the fact that words “fore-bemoaned moan” that come close on the heels of the words "grievances foregone" before it also suggest that Shakespeare is continuously reviewing his past sorrows .

=== Couplet ===
The couplet of the sonnet consists of lines 13 and 14, and they seem to be used to clinch the sonnet's ending. It offers the compensation as all woes vanish in recollection of the "dear friend." The narrator talks as if the joy of the dear friend wipes out all the pain of remembrance. David West suggests that the couplet takes away the point of the beginning three quatrains by stating that the mountain of failure could be easily removed by the thought of the beloved. Others agree by stating the couplet jumps out like a jack in the box or that the couplet is just simply tacked on in the end. Some also say that the couplet of Sonnet 30 to be weak, perfunctory, trite and gives an appearance of intellectual collapse.

== Allusions to Sonnet 30 in other literature ==
The second line of Shakespeare's Sonnet 30 provided the source of C. K. Scott Moncrieff's title, Remembrance of Things Past, for his English translation (publ. 1922-1931) of French author Marcel Proust's monumental novel in seven volumes, À la recherche du temps perdu (publ. 1913-1927). It is now generally better known as In Search of Lost Time.

== Sources ==
- Baldwin, T. W. (1950). On the Literary Genetics of Shakspeare's Sonnets. University of Illinois Press, Urbana.
- Hubler, Edwin (1952). The Sense of Shakespeare's Sonnets. Princeton University Press, Princeton.
- Schoenfeldt, Michael (2007). The Sonnets: The Cambridge Companion to Shakespeare's Poetry. Patrick Cheney, Cambridge University Press, Cambridge.

First edition and facsimile

- Shakespeare, William (1609). Shake-speares Sonnets: Never Before Imprinted. London: Thomas Thorpe.
- Lee, Sidney, ed. (1905). Shakespeares Sonnets: Being a reproduction in facsimile of the first edition. Oxford: Clarendon Press. OCLC 458829162.

Variorum editions

- Alden, Raymond Macdonald, ed. (1916). The Sonnets of Shakespeare. Boston: Houghton Mifflin Harcourt. OCLC 234756.
- Rollins, Hyder Edward, ed. (1944). A New Variorum Edition of Shakespeare: The Sonnets [2 Volumes]. Philadelphia: J. B. Lippincott & Co. OCLC 6028485. — Volume I and Volume II at the Internet Archive

Modern critical editions

- Atkins, Carl D., ed. (2007). Shakespeare's Sonnets: With Three Hundred Years of Commentary. Madison: Fairleigh Dickinson University Press. ISBN 978-0-8386-4163-7. OCLC 86090499.
- Booth, Stephen, ed. (2000) [1st ed. 1977]. Shakespeare's Sonnets (Rev. ed.). New Haven: Yale Nota Bene. ISBN 0-300-01959-9. OCLC 2968040.
- Burrow, Colin, ed. (2002). The Complete Sonnets and Poems. The Oxford Shakespeare. Oxford: Oxford University Press. ISBN 978-0192819338. OCLC 48532938.
- Duncan-Jones, Katherine, ed. (2010) [1st ed. 1997]. Shakespeare's Sonnets. Arden Shakespeare, third series (Rev. ed.). London: Bloomsbury. ISBN 978-1-4080-1797-5. OCLC 755065951. — 1st edition at the Internet Archive
- Evans, G. Blakemore, ed. (1996). The Sonnets. The New Cambridge Shakespeare. Cambridge: Cambridge University Press. ISBN 978-0521294034. OCLC 32272082.
- Kerrigan, John, ed. (1995) [1st ed. 1986]. The Sonnets ; and, A Lover's Complaint. New Penguin Shakespeare (Rev. ed.). Penguin Books. ISBN 0-14-070732-8. OCLC 15018446.
- Mowat, Barbara A.; Werstine, Paul, eds. (2006). Shakespeare's Sonnets & Poems. Folger Shakespeare Library. New York: Washington Square Press. ISBN 978-0743273282. OCLC 64594469.
- Orgel, Stephen, ed. (2001). The Sonnets. The Pelican Shakespeare (Rev. ed.). New York: Penguin Books. ISBN 978-0140714531. OCLC 46683809.
- Vendler, Helen, ed. (1997). The Art of Shakespeare's Sonnets. Cambridge, Massachusetts: The Belknap Press of Harvard University Press. ISBN 0-674-63712-7. OCLC 36806589.
