= Imogen Clark =

Imogen Clark may refer to:

- Imogen Clark (swimmer) (born 1999), British swimmer
- Imogen Clark (writer) (?–1936), American novelist and poet
