= Hamnet Shakespeare =

Son of William Shakespeare (1585–1596)

- Baptism record of Hamnet and Judith Shakespeare, 1585
- Born: Stratford-upon-Avon, England
- Baptised: 2 February 1585
- Died: Buried 11 August 1596 (aged 11); Stratford-upon-Avon, England
- Burial place: Church of the Holy Trinity, Stratford-upon-Avon
- Parents: William Shakespeare; Anne Hathaway
- Relatives: Susanna Shakespeare (sister); Judith Shakespeare (twin sister)

Hamnet's death record

Hamnet Shakespeare (baptised 2 February 1585 – buried 11 August 1596) was the only son of William Shakespeare and Anne Hathaway, and the fraternal twin of Judith Shakespeare. Hamnet died at the age of 11. Some Shakespearean scholars speculate on the relationship between Hamnet and his father's later play Hamlet, as well as on possible connections between Hamnet's death and the writing of King John, Romeo and Juliet, Julius Caesar, and Twelfth Night.

Hamnet found cultural representation in 21st-century works such as Neil Gaiman's comic book The Sandman, the 2018 film All Is True, Maggie O'Farrell's 2020 book Hamnet and its 2025 film adaptation, as well as the comedy drama series Upstart Crow (2016–2020).

== Life ==
Little is known about Hamnet's life. Hamnet and his twin sister Judith were born in Stratford-upon-Avon and baptised on 2 February 1585 in Holy Trinity Church by Richard Barton of Coventry. The twins were probably named after Hamnet Sadler, a baker who witnessed Shakespeare's will, and the baker's wife, Judith; Hamnet was not an uncommon personal name in early modern England. According to the record of his baptism in the Register of Solihull, the baker was christened "Hamlette Sadler".

By the time Hamnet was four, his father was already a London playwright. As Shakespeare's popularity grew, he was probably not regularly at home with his family in Stratford. Park Honan believes Hamnet may have completed Lower School, which would have been typical for the contemporary eleven-year-old.

== Death ==
The exact circumstances of Hamnet's death are unknown, as parish registers did not record the cause of death. Some sources speculate Hamnet's death resulted from famine or bubonic plague, the latter of which is disputed although the disease affected England in that period. At that time in England, about a third of all children died before age 10.

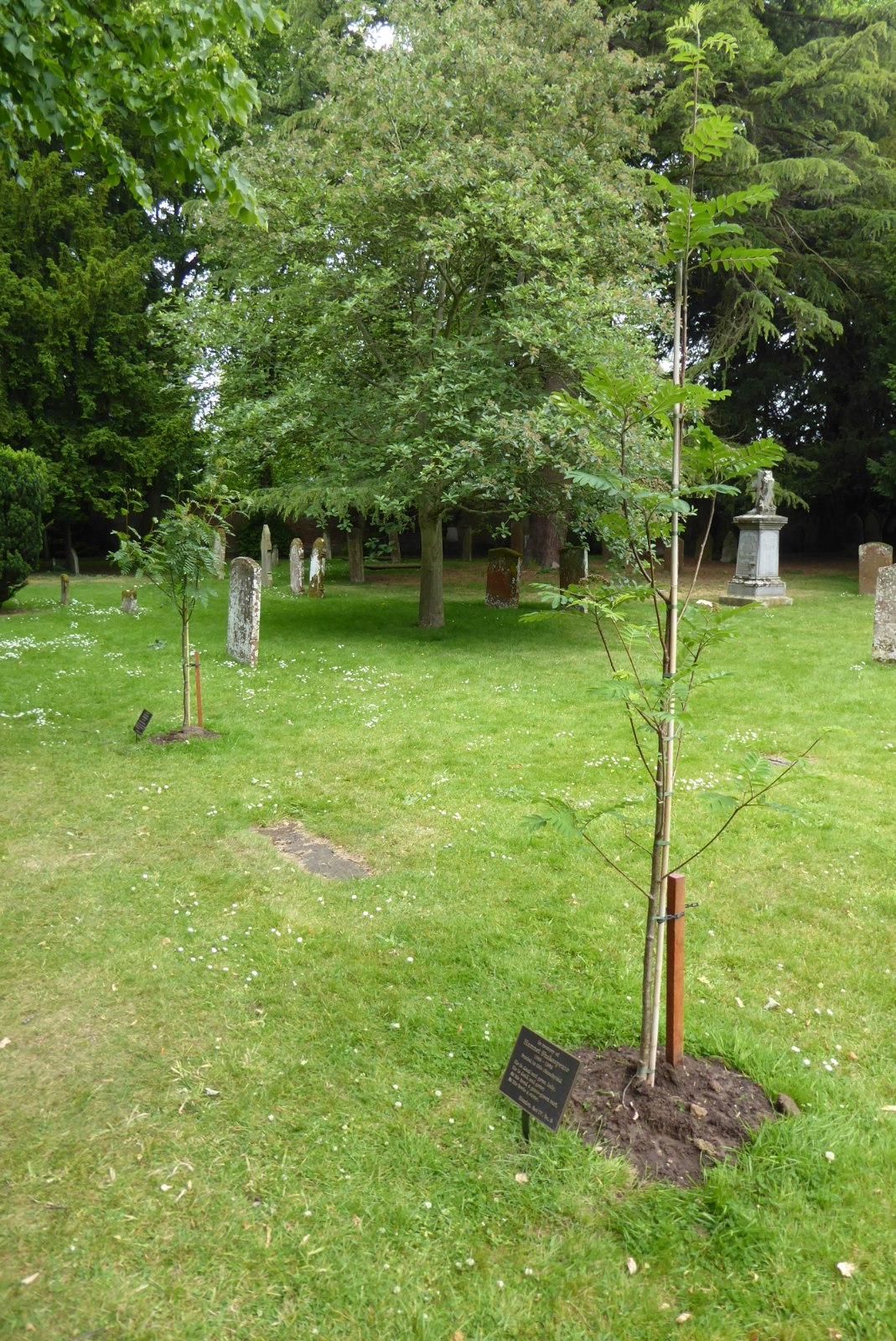
Memorial trees to Hamnet and Judith at the Church of the Holy Trinity, Stratford-upon-Avon

As recorded in its Parish Register, Hamnet was buried at the Church of the Holy Trinity in Stratford on 11 August 1596, likely before his father (who was on tour in Kent in early August) learned of his death. His grave is unmarked.

== Connection to William Shakespeare's work ==
Grief fills the room up of my absent child,
Lies in his bed, walks up and down with me,
Puts on his pretty looks, repeats his words,
Remembers me of all his gracious parts,
Stuffs out his vacant garments with his form;
Then have I reason to be fond of grief?

— Constance, King John, act 3, scene 4, lines 95–99.

Scholars have long speculated about the potential influence of Hamnet's death upon William Shakespeare's writing. Unlike his contemporary Ben Jonson, who wrote a lengthy piece on the death of his own son, Shakespeare, if he wrote anything in response, did so more subtly. At the time his son died, Shakespeare was writing primarily comedies, and that writing continued until a few years after Hamnet's death, when his major tragedies were written. It is possible that his tragedies gained depth from his experience.

Biographical readings, in which critics would try to connect passages in the plays and sonnets to specific events in Shakespeare's life, are at least as old as the Romantic period. Many writers, scholars, and critics from the 18th to the early 20th century pondered the connection between Hamnet's death and Shakespeare's plays. These scholars and critics included Samuel Taylor Coleridge, Edward Dowden, and J. Dover Wilson, among others. In 1931, C. J. Sisson stated that such interpretations had "gone too far". In 1934, Shakespeare scholar R. W. Chambers agreed, saying that Shakespeare's most cheerful work was written after his son's death, making a connection doubtful. In the mid-to-late 20th century, it became increasingly unpopular for critics to connect events in authors' lives with their work, not just for Shakespeare, but for all writing. More recently, however, as the ideas of the New Criticism have lost prominence, biographical interpretations of Hamnet's relationship to his father's work have begun to re-emerge.

=== Hamlet ===
Some theories about Hamnet's influence on his father's plays are centred on the tragedy Hamlet, composed between 1599 and 1601, but not everyone agrees that grief over his only son's death may have spurred Shakespeare to write the play. Although the names Hamlet and Hamnet were considered virtually interchangeable, and Shakespeare's own will spelled Hamnet Sadler's first name as "Hamlett", critics often assume that the name of the character in the play has an entirely different derivation. Prince Hamlet's name is more often seen as related to the Amleth character in Saxo Grammaticus' Vita Amlethi, an old Scandinavian legend that is very similar to Shakespeare's story. John Dover Wilson, one of the few editors of Hamlet who had a directly related comment, remarks: "It is perhaps an accident that the name [Hamlet] was current in Warwickshire and that Shakespeare's own son Hamnet (born 1585) was christened Hamnet, a variant of it."

More recent scholarship, however, has argued that, while Hamlet has a Scandinavian origin and may have been selected as a play subject for commercial reasons, Shakespeare's grief over the loss of his only son may lie at the heart of the tragedy. Eric Sams points out that it seems to be the author of the Ur-Hamlet who first put an "H" in front of the character's name, and argues that this might be significant: "It was no mere Englishing; he could readily have been called Amleth here too. He had been deliberately rebaptised by his new creator." Sams describes the given name Hamlet as "otherwise unrecorded in any archive ever researched" outside Tudor Stratford, and argues that this name-change was probably Shakespeare's work, because "Only Shakespeare among known dramatists had any known links with the name Hamlet, and his could hardly have been more intimate or intense." Stephen Greenblatt agrees on this last point: "Hamnet and Hamlet are in fact the same name, entirely interchangeable in Stratford records in the late sixteenth and early seventeenth centuries".

=== Other plays ===
Speculation over Hamnet's influence on Shakespeare's works is not limited to Hamlet. Richard Wheeler theorises that Hamnet's death influenced the writing of Twelfth Night, which centres on a girl who believes that her twin brother has died. In the end, she finds that her brother never died, and is alive and well. Wheeler also posits the idea that the women who disguise themselves as men in The Merchant of Venice, As You Like It, and Twelfth Night are a representation of William Shakespeare's seeing his son's hope in his daughters after Hamnet's death. Bill Bryson argues that Constance's speech from the third act of King John (written in the mid-1590s) was inspired by Hamnet's death. In the speech, she laments the loss of her son, Arthur. It is possible, though, that Hamnet was still alive when Constance's lament was written. Many other plays of Shakespeare's have theories surrounding Hamnet. These include questions as to whether a scene in Julius Caesar in which Caesar treats Mark Antony as if he were his own son is related to Hamnet's death, or whether Romeo and Juliet is a tragic reflection of the loss of a son, or if Alonso's guilt over his son's death in The Tempest is related. The grief also echoes in one of the most painful passages Shakespeare ever wrote, in the end of King Lear where the ruined monarch recognises his daughter is dead: "No, no, no life! / Why should a dog, a horse, a rat, have life, / And thou no breath at all? Thou'lt come no more, / Never, never, never, never, never!"

=== Shakespeare's sonnets ===
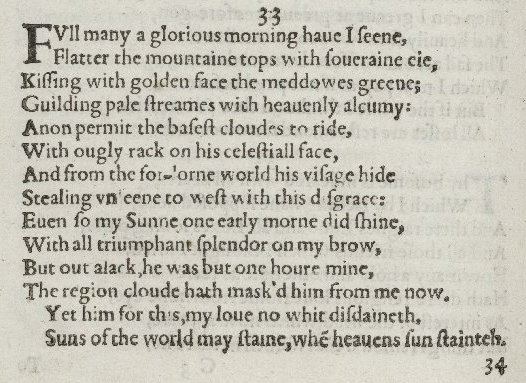
Sonnet 33

Michael Wood suggests that sonnet 33, which is typically grouped with Shakespeare's so-called "Fair Youth" sonnets, might instead allude to Hamnet's death. In this sonnet, there is also an implied pun on "sun" and "son": "Even so my Sunne one early morne did shine / With all triumphant splendor on my brow; / But out alack, he was but one houre mine, / The region cloude hath mask'd him from me now". Juan Daniel Millán believes that not only sonnet 33 alludes to Hamnet's death, but that all of the Fair Youth sonnets were dedicated to Hamnet and that they were Shakespeare's way of dealing with the loss. He suggests that Hamnet is the fair youth the poems are addressing.

Sonnet 37 may have also been written in response to Hamnet's death. In it, Shakespeare says, "As a decrepit father takes delight / To see his active child do deeds of youth / So I, made lame by fortune's dearest spight / Take all my comfort of thy worth and truth." Still, if this is an allusion to Hamnet, it is a vague one.

== In popular culture ==
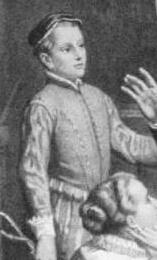
Hamnet as depicted in an engraving c. 1890

Cover to Will Shakespeare's Little Lad by Imogen Clark, an 1897 fictionalization of Hamnet's life

- Imogen Clark wrote Will Shakespeare's Little Lad, an 1897 fictionalization of Hamnet's life.
- In the 1966 detective novel Death at the Dolphin by Ngaio Marsh, a glove which had belonged to Hamnet Shakespeare, made by William Shakespeare's father John plays an important part.
- Suzanne Collins's 2005 book Gregor and the Curse of the Warmbloods, the third book in her Underland Chronicles series, featured a character named Hamnet.
- Hamnet appears in two comics by Neil Gaiman, which share a setting. In The Sandman #19, "A Midsummer Night's Dream", he accompanies his father and plays the role of the changeling boy in the aforementioned play; at the end, it is implied that the faerie queen Titania has taken him to Faerie. In The Books of Magic #3, "The Land of Summer's Twilight", he is shown as her servant.
- Hamnet Shakespeare is a character in the BBC comedy drama series Upstart Crow, about the life of William Shakespeare in London and Stratford-upon-Avon. Hamnet's death occurs in the final episode of series 3.
- He appears as a character in the 2018 film All Is True, written by Ben Elton. The largely fictionalised plot revolves around William Shakespeare coming to terms with Hamnet's death and his relationship with his family.
- Irish novelist Maggie O'Farrell's 2020 book Hamnet is a fictional account of the life of Hamnet.
- In 2025, Chloé Zhao's film adaptation of Hamnet premiered. Jacobi Jupe portrays the titular character.
