= Sonnet 31 =

« » Sonnet 31
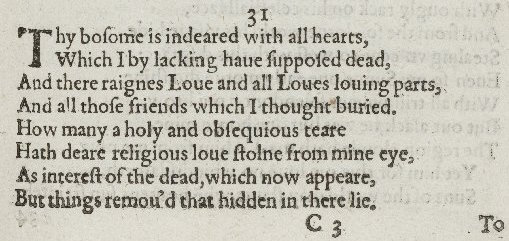
- The first two stanzas of Sonnet 31 in the 1609 Quarto
Q1
Q2
Q3
C
Thy bosom is endeared with all hearts,
Which I by lacking have supposed dead,
And there reigns love, and all love’s loving parts,
And all those friends which I thought buried.
How many a holy and obsequious tear
Hath dear religious love stol’n from mine eye,
As interest of the dead, which now appear
But things remov’d that hidden in thee lie!
Thou art the grave where buried love doth live,
Hung with the trophies of my lovers gone,
Who all their parts of me to thee did give;
That due of many now is thine alone:
Their images I lov’d I view in thee,
And thou, all they, hast all the all of me.
—William Shakespeare
4
8
12
14

Sonnet 31 is one of 154 sonnets written by the English playwright and poet William Shakespeare. It is a sonnet within the Fair Youth sequence. Developing an idea introduced at the end of Sonnet 30, this poem figures the young man's superiority in terms of the possession of all the love the speaker has ever experienced.

== Structure ==
Sonnet 31 is a typical English or Shakespearean sonnet, with three quatrains followed by a final couplet. It follows the form's typical rhyme scheme: ABAB CDCD EFEF GG. Like other Shakespearean sonnets it is written in iambic pentameter, a type of metre based on five pairs of metrically weak/strong syllabic positions per line.

Metrically the sonnet is fairly regular, but demands several syllabic contractions and expansions. The first two lines each contain one expansion (marked with è below):

  ×  / ×  /  ×  /  ×   ×   /    / 
Thy bosom is endearèd with all hearts,

  ×   /  ×  /  ×    /    ×  / ×   / 
Which I by lacking have supposèd dead; (31.1-2)

/ = ictus, a metrically strong syllabic position. × = nonictus.

(In the first line, additionally, the fourth ictus moves to the right, resulting in a four-position figure, × × / /, sometimes referred to as a minor ionic.) Also expanded is line four's three-syllable "burièd" (though it retains two syllables in line nine). Other syllables must be contracted, as two-syllable "many a" and three-syllable "obsequious" below. Both are instances of the y-glide, pronounced approximately man-ya and ob-seq-wyus.

 ×   /   ×  / × /   ×  /   ×    / 
How many a holy and obsequious tear (31.5)

Also contracted are line six's "stol'n" and line seven's "int'rest".

== Source and analysis ==
Critics such as Malone, Collier, Dowden and Larsen glossed "obsequious" as "funereal"; others have preferred the simpler "dutiful". The quarto's "there" in line 8 is generally amended to "thee," although certain critics have defended the quarto reading.

"Religious love" is frequently compared to a similar phrase used ironically in A Lover's Complaint; G. Wilson Knight connects the phrase to a "suprapersonal reality created by love" in the sequence as a whole.

Numerous editors have placed a period after "give" in line 11. This practice, which is not universal, changes the "that" in line 12 from an abbreviated "so that" to a demonstrative; the advantage of this procedure is that it renders comprehensible the "due" in line 12.

T. W. Baldwin argued on thematic grounds that this poem should immediately follow Sonnet 20 and Sonnet 22. This argument, like others to rearrange the sonnets, has not received wide acceptance.
