= Sonnet 37 =

« » Sonnet 37
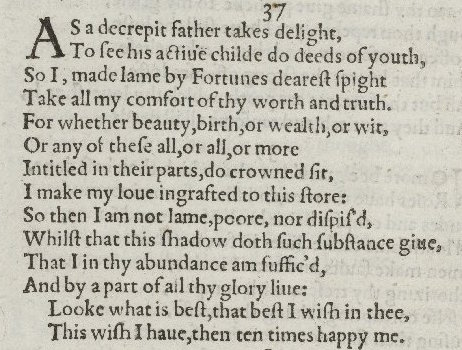
- Sonnet 37 in the 1609 Quarto
Q1
Q2
Q3
C
As a decrepit father takes delight
To see his active child do deeds of youth,
So I, made lame by fortune’s dearest spite,
Take all my comfort of thy worth and truth;
For whether beauty, birth, or wealth, or wit,
Or any of these all, or all, or more,
Entitled in thy parts do crowned sit,
I make my love engrafted to this store:
So then I am not lame, poor, nor despis’d,
Whilst that this shadow doth such substance give
That I in thy abundance am suffic’d
And by a part of all thy glory live.
Look, what is best, that best I wish in thee:
This wish I have; then ten times happy me!
—William Shakespeare
4
8
12
14

Shakespeare's Sonnet 37 returns to a number of themes sounded in the first 25 of the cycle, such as the effects of age and recuperation from age, and the blurred boundaries between lover and beloved. However, the tone is more complex than in the earlier poems: after the betrayal treated in Sonnets 34–36, the speaker does not return to a simple celebration.

== Structure ==
Sonnet 37 is an English or Shakespearean sonnet. The English sonnet is constructed with three quatrains and a final rhyming couplet. The poem follows the form's typical rhyme scheme, ABAB CDCD EFEF GG, and like other Shakespearean sonnets is written in iambic pentameter, a type of poetic metre based on five pairs of metrically weak/strong syllabic positions per line. The second line exemplifies a regular iambic pentameter:

 ×  /   ×  /  ×     /    ×  /    ×   / 
To see his active child do deeds of youth, (37.2)

/ = ictus, a metrically strong syllabic position. × = nonictus.

== Source and analysis ==
The sonnet was at one point a favorite of biographically oriented critics, such as Edward Capell, who saw in the opening lines a reference either to a physical debility or to Shakespeare's son. This interpretation was rejected by Edmond Malone and others; Horace Howard Furness, discussing it in conjunction with the legend that Shakespeare played Adam in As You Like It, calls the supposition "monstrous." Edward Dowden notes that lameness is used symbolically (as in Coriolanus 4.7.7) to indicate weakness or contemptibility. George Wyndham and Henry Charles Beeching are among the editors who find other analogues for "lame" in this metaphorical sense.

"Dearest" (3) is glossed by Gervinus as "heartfelt", but Malone's gloss "most operative" is generally accepted.

Line 7 has been much discussed. Malone's emendation of "their" to "thy" is no longer accepted. George Steevens, finding an analogy in The Rape of Lucrece, glosses it as "entitled (ie, ennobled) by these things." Nicolaus Delius has it "established in thy gifts, with right of possession." Sidney Lee has "ennobled in thee", reversing the relationship between beloved and "parts." It is commonly agreed that the image is drawn from heraldry.

"Shadow" and "substance" are drawn from Renaissance Neoplatonism; Stephen Booth notes that the wit of line 10 derives from Shakespeare's reversal of the usual relationship between reality and reflection.
