= Robert Parry (poet) =

Welsh poet, romancier and translator

- Born: 1540
- Died: 1612 (aged 71–72)
- Occupations: Romance writer; poet; translator
- Years active: 1595-1612
- Notable work: Sinetes Passions; Moderatus

Robert Parry (1540–1612) was a Welsh poet, romancier and translator who published the romance Moderatus and a collection of verse entitled Sinetes Passions, which may have influenced Shakespeare's sonnets.

== Life ==
Parry was a member of the local gentry of Denbighshire, Wales. He was the son of Harry ap Robert. He married Dorothy the daughter of John Wynn Panton. His patron was Sir John Salusbury, the local leader of a group of poets dedicated to mystical and acrostic verse. Parry's nephew later married Sir John's daughter Oriana.

His diary has survived, providing useful information about Elizabethan culture and politics in Wales. It also indicates that he travelled widely. He was regularly in London and in 1600 he went to Italy where he stayed for six months.

== Work ==
In 1595 he published a romance novel entitled Moderatus, the most delectable and famous Historie of the Black Knight, the story of a knight who learns life-lessons through struggle and error, supported by the loyalty of his friend Priscius. It was dedicated to "Henry Townshend … one of her Maiesties Justices of Assise of the countie Pallatine of Chester".

Parry is believed to be the "R.P." who helped Margaret Tyler to translate the Spanish book Espejo de Principes y Cavalleros under the title Mirrour of Princely Deeds and Knighthood, or rather replaced her as translator for the second volume.

The full title of Parry's poetry book is "Sinetes passions vppon his fortunes offered for an incense at the shrine of the ladies which guided his distempered thoughtes. The patrons patheticall posies, sonets, maddrigals, and rowndelayes. Together with Sinetes dompe" The "patron's pathetical posies" have been said to be verses by Salusbury himself, but G. Blakemore Evans argues that they are by Parry, characterised by his typical heavy use of alliteration and word repetition. The main body of the book comprises forty six "passions", a series of four-verse complaints about love. The meaning of the name "Sinetes" is obscure.

Katherine Duncan-Jones and Henry Woudhuyson argue that Shakespeare may have known Parry's work, because there are verbal parallels between his poems and Shakespeare's sonnets.
