= Sonnet 39 =

« » Sonnet 39
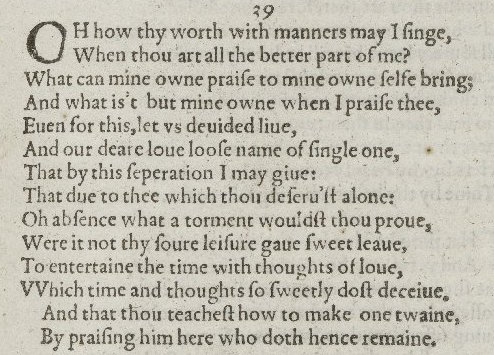
- Sonnet 39 in the 1609 Quarto
Q1
Q2
Q3
C
O, how thy worth with manners may I sing,
When thou art all the better part of me?
What can mine own praise to mine own self bring,
And what is’t but mine own when I praise thee?
Even for this, let us divided live,
And our dear love lose name of single one,
That by this separation I may give
That due to thee which thou deserv’st alone.
O absence, what a torment wouldst thou prove,
Were it not thy sour leisure gave sweet leave
To entertain the time with thoughts of love,
Which time and thoughts so sweetly dost deceive,
And that thou teachest how to make one twain
By praising him here who doth hence remain!
—William Shakespeare
4
8
12
14

Sonnet 39 is one of 154 sonnets written by the English playwright and poet William Shakespeare. It is a member of the Fair Youth sequence, in which the poet expresses his love towards a young man.

== Structure ==
Sonnet 39 is an English or Shakespearean sonnet, composed of three quatrains and a final rhyming couplet for a total of fourteen lines. It follows the rhyme scheme ABAB CDCD EFEF GG. It is written in iambic pentameter, a metre based on five pairs of syllables accented weak/strong. The first line is one example of a line of regular iambic pentameter:

×   /   ×    /    ×    /  ×    /  ×   / 
O, how thy worth with manners may I sing

/ = ictus, a metrically strong syllabic position. × = nonictus.

The fifth line can be scanned with an initial reversal:

/ ×   ×    /    x  /   × / ×   / 
Even for this, let us divided live, (39.5)

== Themes ==
Sonnet 39 continues with sonnets 35–37 the theme of the poet and the young man being united in love as one person and the suggestion of being separated (twain): “How can I praise you properly when we are so combined? I would be praising, in a sense, myself.” The poet suggests that a separation will help him praise the young man while thinking of his admirable aspects in absence. Beginning with line 9 the poet addresses not the youth, but “absence”: “Oh absence, you would be torment, except that you provide a pleasant opportunity to think on love, and, absence, you teach one to be not solitary but to be two, by praising the young man where I am, though he continues to be elsewhere (hence).”
