= Sonnet 32 =

« » Sonnet 32
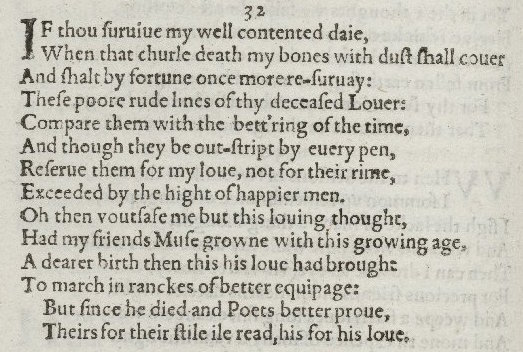
- Sonnet 32 in the 1609 Quarto
Q1
Q2
Q3
C
If thou survive my well-contented day,
When that churl Death my bones with dust shall cover,
And shalt by fortune once more re-survey
These poor rude lines of thy deceased lover,
Compare them with the bettering of the time,
And though they be outstripp’d by every pen,
Reserve them for my love, not for their rhyme,
Exceeded by the height of happier men.
O, then vouchsafe me but this loving thought:
“Had my friend’s Muse grown with this growing age,
A dearer birth than this his love had brought,
To march in ranks of better equipage:
But since he died, and poets better prove,
Theirs for their style I’ll read, his for his love.”
—William Shakespeare
4
8
12
14

Sonnet 32 is one of 154 sonnets written by the English playwright and poet William Shakespeare. It is a member of the Fair Youth sequence, in which the poet expresses his love towards a young man. The writer is reflecting on a future in which the young man will probably outlive him. The writer takes a melancholy tone, telling the young man to remember the writer not because of the strength of the sonnets, but because the love that has been shown to the young man far surpasses any love shown by another poet.

== Speaker and subject ==
Shakespeare's sonnets are typically classified in reference to speaker and subject. Sonnet 32 is commonly accepted as a "handsome youth" sonnet. This classification as a handsome youth sonnet is significant as it characterizes both the speaker and the subject within the sonnet: the speaker, as a man displaying his affection for the subject who is a young, handsome man.

The identity of the speaker is a well debated topic however. Some believe that the speaker is merely a character that Shakespeare has created as an expression of art. However, the speaker is often thought to be Shakespeare himself, thus giving the content of the sonnet a much more personal sentiment. Some depict the voice of the speaker merely as a "construct[ed]" character by the author to "generate…reader interest, sympathy, and involvement that deserve closer attention". Thus the speaker is not a reflection of the author but instead an authorial tool to evoke interest from the reader.

In contrast, some critics believe that Shakespeare's sonnets are "autobiograph[ical]" and that the two characters within the sonnet are Shakespeare and an unidentified male object of lust or affection.

Ultimately, there is critical disagreement over whether the character of Shakespeare's speaker is ambiguous, Shakespeare himself, or a constructed character.

== Content ==
Sonnet 32 is highly dependent upon the relationship between the subject and speaker of the sonnet. The speaker of the sonnet reflects upon "his own mortality" in comparing himself to the young man whom he loves, whether romantically or in friendship it is unclear. The speaker refers to himself as the "deceased lover" which is significant as it highlights the age difference between the two men, a perpetual theme throughout Sonnet 32 as well as the rest of the handsome youth sonnets. After accepting, his eventual death, the speaker takes on a "self-deprecating" tone referring to his poetry as "poor rude lines" (4) and beseeching the youth to remember him after his death. This emphasis on his failure in poetry is imperative as it frames the rest of the sonnet and the speaker's request for the young man to remember him "for his love" (14).

The nature of this love is in disagreement however. While some critics believe that the love the speaker refers to is in actuality a "romantic" love, others are convinced that the "love" (14) referred to is a "platonic love". Regardless of the type of love that is illustrated within the sonnet, romantic or platonic, the love declaration should be considered significant as it characterizes the speaker's tone and content. However, the audience should "take with a pinch of salt" the seemingly modest self-denunciation and claims of inadequacy put forth by the speaker; due to the fact that they are simply a means by which the speaker emphasizes his affection for the subject.

Subsequently, the content of Sonnet 32 is dependent upon the outlook of the speaker and the love he feels for the subject.

== Structure ==
Sonnet 32 is written in the English (Shakespearean) sonnet form. It consists of 14 lines: 3 quatrains followed by a couplet. The metrical line is iambic pentameter with the rhyme scheme ABAB CDCD EFEF GG. Literary critic George T. Wright observes how iambic pentameter, "however highly patterned its syntax, is by nature asymmetrical – like human speech". Thus, the organization of a sonnet exists so that meaning may be found in its variation.

The first two lines contrast metrically:

×    /   ×  /    ×  /    ×  /  ×   /
If thou survive my well-contented day,

  ×    ×    /    /     ×  /     ×    /     ×    /(×)
When that churl Death my bones with dust shall cover (32.1-2)

/ = ictus, a metrically strong syllabic position. × = nonictus. (×) = extrametrical syllable.

While the first is quite regular, the second has a final extrametrical syllable or feminine ending, as well as its initial ictus moved to the right (resulting in a four-position figure, × × / /, sometimes referred to as a minor ionic).

The purpose of a Shakespearean couplet is to analyze and summarize the author's experience, as well as, to describe and enact it. In regards to the relationship of quatrain to couplet, "one must distinguish the fictive speaker (even when he represents himself as a poet) from Shakespeare the author". This is particularly significant in Sonnet 32 because the fictive author reflects on his ability to write poetry.

The structure of Sonnet 32 can be interpreted in light of its relationship to time. "The exact match created between events as foreseen by the poet (his death, the increasing poetic sophistication of the age and consequently of the beloved's taste) and the beloved's conjectured thought as he rereads the poet's verse makes intelligible Shakespeare's choice of a structure of superposition (in which lines 9-14 [beloved's thought] repeat lines 3-8 [speaker's wish])."
