= Sonnet 38 =

« » Sonnet 38
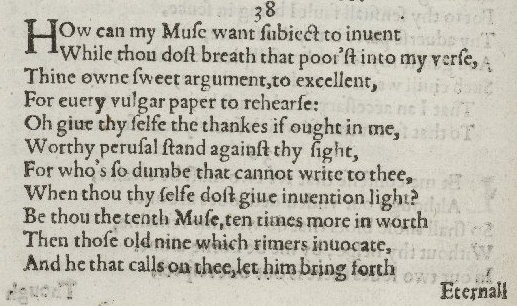
- The first eleven lines of Sonnet 38 in the 1609 Quarto
Q1
Q2
Q3
C
How can my Muse want subject to invent,
While thou dost breathe, that pour’st into my verse
Thine own sweet argument, too excellent
For every vulgar paper to rehearse?
O, give thyself the thanks, if aught in me
Worthy perusal stand against thy sight;
For who’s so dumb that cannot write to thee,
When thou thyself dost give invention light?
Be thou the tenth Muse, ten times more in worth
Than those old nine which rhymers invocate;
And he that calls on thee, let him bring forth
Eternal numbers to outlive long date.
If my slight Muse do please these curious days,
The pain be mine, but thine shall be the praise.
—William Shakespeare
4
8
12
14

Sonnet 38 is one of 154 sonnets written by the English playwright and poet William Shakespeare. It is a member of the Fair Youth sequence, in which the lyric subject expresses its love towards a young man.

== Structure ==
Sonnet 38 is an English or Shakespearean sonnet, composed of three quatrains and a final rhyming couplet. It follows the form's typical rhyme scheme, ABAB CDCD EFEF GG. Like other Shakespearean sonnets the poem is composed in a type of poetic metre known as iambic pentameter based on five pairs of metrically weak/strong syllabic positions. The final line exemplifies a regular iambic pentameter:

  ×  /    ×  /     ×    /     ×    /   ×   / 
The pain be mine, but thine shall be the praise. (38.14)

/ = ictus, a metrically strong syllabic position. × = nonictus.
