= Margaret Tyler =

English writer and translator

- Born: c. 1540
- Died: c. 1590
- Occupation: translator
- Years active: 1570s
- Notable work: 'The Mirrour of Princely Deedes and Knighthood

Margaret Tyler (c. 1540 - c. 1590) was the first Englishwoman to translate a Spanish romance and the first woman to publish a romance in England. She also published a defense of the seriousness and importance of women’s writing. She proposed that both men and women should be treated as rational beings, arguing that “it is all one for a woman to pen a story, as for a man to address his story to a woman.”

In 1578, the publication of The Mirrour of Princely Deedes and Knighthood, Margaret Tyler's translation of Diego Ortúñez de Calahorra's Spanish romance, Espejo de Príncipes y Cavalleros, was met with criticism because its masculine and secular topic was considered inappropriate for a woman. Other women had translated religious literature, as this conformed with the notion that female education should promote piety. Treaties and handbooks on education stressed the danger in allowing eager female students to read foreign tales of love. Tyler protested in her letter “to the reader” against restrictions imposed on the literary efforts of women.

== Life ==
Tyler's biography remains speculative. The identification of even her class and religion are difficult and controversial. The only certainties about her life are described in the dedicatory letter she wrote to Lord Thomas Howard in her translation of the first part of The Mirrour of Princely Deeds and Knighthood. In this dedication, Tyler explains that she was a servant to the aristocratic Howard family and describes herself as "middle-aged". Based on these two facts, some scholars have identified her as the wife of another servant, John Tyler, who was responsible for the duke's tenant and land records. References to "Tyler's wife" in a contemporary letter indicate that she may have served in the Howard family in the 1560s and served the Woodhouses and Bacons in the 1570s. A will written by a Margaret Tyler in 1595 at Castle Camps, a town near Cambridge, indicates that she may have had a son, Robert Tyler, and a daughter surnamed Ross.

Some scholars, most notably Maria Ferguson and Louise Schleiner, believe that Tyler was Catholic since she served in the Catholic Howard family. She may also have been Spanish-born, and would have journeyed to England with the retinue of Álvaro de la Quadra, the ambassador of Philip II. Ferguson, however, conjectures that Tyler may have been a pseudonym for Margaret Tyrell, who was related by marriage to the Howards.

The source of Tyler's knowledge of Spanish is not known. Knowledge of the Spanish language was of value to English merchants at the time due to the importance of Spain’s economy. During that era, merchants' daughters or the servants of traveling diplomats may have learned the language.

== Major works ==
=== The Mirrour of Princely Deedes and Knighthood ===
The 1578 publication of The Mirrour of Princely Deedes and Knighthood, Margaret Tyler's translation of Diego Ortúñez de Calahorra's Spanish romance, was a dramatic entry into the literary realm. Throughout this romance, Tyler's translation follows the original closely and makes only some small changes. Tyler usually breaks a long sentence into shorter ones. She prefers clarity to preserving the elegance and flow of the original. She sometimes adds a few words and/or changes a chapter heading. For example, Tyler's chapter heading for chapter 29 emphasizes the hero's cross-dressing, whereas Ortúñez does not. Tyler also includes a sentence in chapter 15 that is not in Ortúñez version.

An example of the similarity and differences between Ortúñez and Tyler's work can be seen in the views below. The Spanish and English version are both similar. In the opening sentence of the romance, the word-order and vocabulary in the translation are quite close to the original and only a slight difference is seen.

Después quel grande emperador Constantino pobló la gran ciudad de Constantinopla de los nobles ciudadanos romanos, reedificando los antiquos edificios fundados por Pausania, rey de los partos, entre todos los emperadores que después dél sucedieron en el imperio griego ninguno paresce que tanto se haya levantado, ni su nombre hiziesse tan famoso, como el grande y muy nombrado emperador Trebacio, cuyos hechos y las inmortales hazañas de los cavalleros de su tiempo quiero aquí contar, según que Artimidoro el griego en los grandes volúmines de sus corónicas lo dexó escripto, el qual dize ansí.5 [End Page 299]

After that the greate Emperour Constantine had peopled the Citie of Constantinople, with the race of the noble Citizens of Rome, and had reedified the auncient buildings founded by Pansanias king of the Parthes. Among all the Emperours which succeeded in that Empire of Greece, none seemed to have raysed his own name, or to have made it so famous, as the great and mightie Emperour Trebatio. Whose worthy deedes with the valiant actes of the knights of his time, I will report here, according as Artimidoro the Grecian hath left them written in the great volumes of his Cronicle.

Tyler's translation was hugely successful, so much so that The Second Part of the Mirrour of Knighthood was soon commissioned, though this was translated by the Welsh poet Robert Parry, not Tyler. Tina Krontiris thinks this is probably because Tyler was by then "too old for another laborious translating task". The full series of the Spanish originals was eventually published in eight volumes.

==== Dedication to Thomas Howard ====
In the dedicatory letter to Thomas Howard, Tyler explains and justifies her actions, stating, "the earnestness of my friends persuaded me that it was convenient to lay forth my talent for increase, or to set my candle on a candlestick, and the consideration of my insufficiency drove me to think it better for my ease either quite to bury my talent...or rather to put my candle clean out than that it should bewray every unswept corner of my house; but the opinion of my friends' judgement prevailed above mine own reason.” She claims, in short, that she took on this labour to make her friends happy. She adds that she in no way meant for her work to sound ungrateful to the Howard family: “Under your Honour’s protection, I shall less fear the assault of the envious, and of your Honour’s good acceptation.” Since she served Thomas Howard’s family, she felt the need to testify to him since his parents were already deceased. In the standard manner of such dedications, Tyler wanted to make sure she was seen grateful and loyal to the Howard family: "I bear to your parents while they lived, then being their servant, and now do owe unto their offspring after their decease, for their demerits."

==== To the reader ====
Tyler's preface justifies her activity as a translator. Krontiris suggests that female translators were typically more literal than male ones, in order to emphasise their submissiveness. Tyler follows this convention, saying that "the invention, disposition and trimming of this story is wholly an other man's, my part none therein but the translation". However, after this standard declaration of modesty, Tyler defies convention by asserting her right as a woman to authorship. She implicitly concedes that men might retain a right to "discourse in learning", but never directly accepts it. However, she confidently affirms that story-telling is the province of both sexes, and thus it is "all one" whether a tale is told by a woman or a man.
