= Imogen Clark (writer) =

American writer

- Will Shakespeare’s Little Lad (1897)
- Born: October 30, 1858; New York City
- Died: January 2, 1936; New York City
- Resting place: Green-Wood Cemetery
- Occupation: Writer

Imogen Gertrude Clark (October 30, 1858-2 January 1936) was an American novelist and poet.

Imogen Clark was born in New York City, the daughter of George Homer Clark and Phillie Beatty Clark.

Many of her novels were historical fiction, such as God’s Puppets: A Story of Old New York (1901), set in New York City around 1750 and inspired by the story of a Dutch minister who left his pulpit. God's Puppets was published in England as The Domine's Garden. She also wrote works for children, including Will Shakespeare’s Little Lad (1897), a fictionalized story of the life of Hamnet Shakespeare, son of William Shakespeare.

She said "I care most about the human interest and the story. I am tired of the modern novel that deals with problems, or motor cars, or trusts. I want to write about people whom one meets in real life and have real joys and real sorrows."

She was in an automobile accident on December 12, 1935 and died of her injuries in Park East Hospital in Manhattan on January 2, 1936. She was buried at Green-Wood cemetery. The register gives her age at death as 68.

== Partial bibliography ==
- The Victory of Ezry Gardner (1897)
- Will Shakespeare’s Little Lad (1897)
- The Heresy of Parson Medlicott (1900)
- God’s Puppets (1901)
- A Charming Humbug (1909)
- Old Days and Old Ways (1928)
