= G. Blakemore Evans =

20th-century American academic and scholar of Elizabethan literature

Gwynne Blakemore Evans (31 March 1912 – 23 December 2005) was an American scholar of Elizabethan literature best known for editing the Riverside Shakespeare edition in 1974.

== Biography ==
Evans was born on March 31, 1912, in Columbus, Ohio, to Marshall B. Evans, a scholar of the German language at Ohio State University. Gwynne graduated from that university in 1934. He then earned a master's degree from the University of Cincinnati in 1936. He received his doctorate from Harvard University in 1940. In 2000 Albright College awarded him a Doctor of Laws (LL.D.), honoris causa.

From 1942 to 1945, Evans served in the United States Army Signal Corps Intelligence during World War II at Bletchley Park in England, a centre of Allied spying and decoding and became a sergeant.

After the war, Evans became a professor of English literature, working at the University of Wisconsin–Madison, the University of Illinois Urbana-Champaign, and Harvard University, where he became Cabot Professor.

Evan's first book was The Plays and Poems of William Cartwright (1951), an edition of the obscure poet and playwright William Cartwright. He also edited Shakespeare Prompt-Books of the 17th Century (1960–80), a series of editions of rare promptbooks.

His popular edition of Shakespeare's complete works, the Riverside Shakespeare, was published in 1974 by Houghton Mifflin, and remained the standard text of Shakespeare's works in university classrooms for the next quarter century. Evans co-edited an updated version in 1997. He also edited Richard III for the New Penguin Shakespeare and Romeo and Juliet for the New Cambridge Shakespeare.

Evans died on December 23, 2005, aged 93, in Cambridge, Massachusetts.

== Legacy ==
Evans's last book was The Poems of Robert Parry, a study of the little-known poet Robert Parry.
