= Nicolaus Delius =

19th-century German philologist

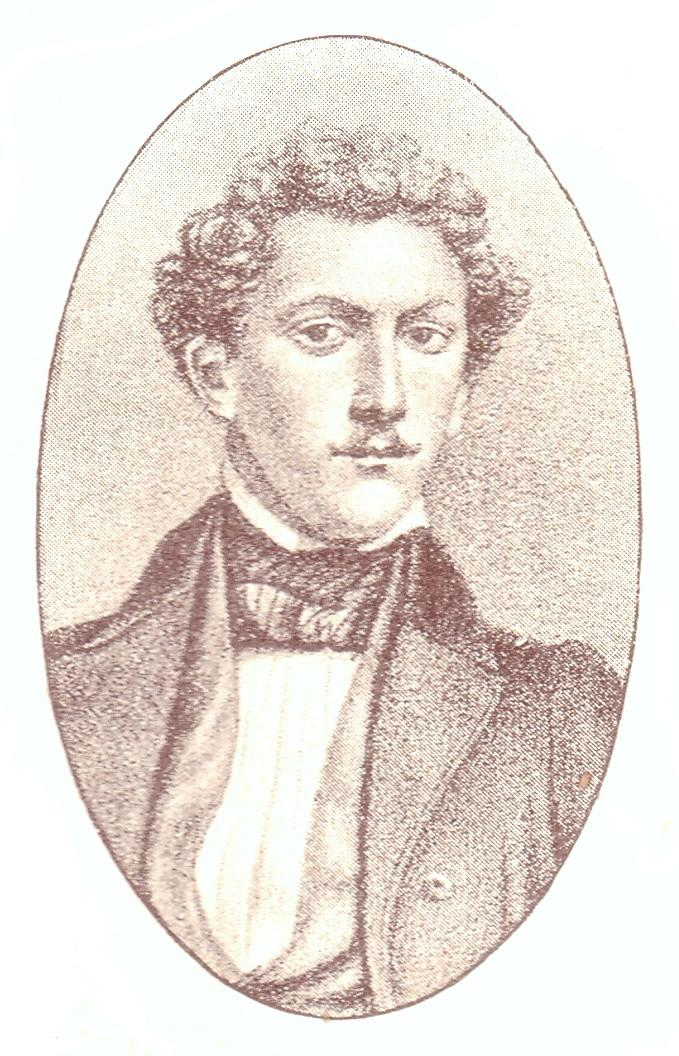
Nicolaus Delius

Nicolaus Delius (19 September 1813 – 18 November 1888) was a German philologist. Delius was born at Bremen; he was distinguished especially as a student of Shakespeare and for his edition of Shakespeare's works.

== Life and work ==
Nikolaus Delius went to school in Bremen. After passing his A-levels he read philosophy, history, Greek literature, and Sanskrit at the universities of Bonn and Berlin. In 1838 Delius finished his studies with a promotion in Bonn (doctoral thesis: Radices pracriticae) and taught at Berlin University afterwards. In 1844/1845 he wrote articles amongst others for the new Weser-Zeitung (Weser News) in Bremen. About a year later he made up his mind to work as a private lecturer at Bonn University. From that time on he became interested in the works of William Shakespeare.

Delius became well known for his edition of Shakespeare’s works between 1854 and 1860. Since 1855 Delius held a chair for combined French-English studies but because of this edition he was given a chair in English studies, the first ever to be given in Germany. He held the chair up to 1880. Delius was a co-founder and for years to come chairman of the Deutschen Shakespeare-Gesellschaft (German Shakespeare Society). He was the author of a multitude of articles, papers, and translations regarding Shakespeare. He left his valuable Shakespeare collection to the Bremen public library. From 1837 onwards he was a member of the Guestphalia Bonn student’s corporation. Nikolaus Delius was buried on the Bremen Waller Friedhof (Waller graveyard) in the plot of the Schüssler-Delius-Gruner family (plot number J 137).

== Selected publications ==
=== English Studies ===
- Die Tieck'sche Shakespearekritik. König, Bonn 1846. Nachdruck: Olms, Hildesheim, New York 1981, ISBN 3-487-07043-X.

=== French Studies ===
- Die romanische Sprachfamilie, Bonn 1850
- Maistre Wace's St. Nicholas. Ein altfranzösisches Gedicht des zwölften Jahrhunderts aus Oxforder Handschriften, Bonn 1850
- Ungedruckte provenzalische Lieder von Peire Vidal, Bernard von Ventadorn, Folquet von Marseille und Peirol von Auvergne, Bonn 1853
- Der sardinische Dialekt des 13. Jahrhunderts, Bonn 1868

== Secondary literature ==
- Franz Brümmer (1903). "Delius, Nikolaus" . Allgemeine Deutsche Biographie (in German). Vol. 47. Leipzig: Duncker & Humblot. p. 653.
- Wolfgang Clemen (1957). "Delius, Nicolaus". Neue Deutsche Biographie (in German). Vol. 3. Berlin: Duncker & Humblot. pp. 585–586. (full text online).
- Thomas Schaefer: Wer liegt wo? Prominente auf Bremer Friedhöfen. Siepmann und Kurze, Bremen 1998, ISBN 3-933410-00-2.
- Michael Hiltscher: "Nicolaus Delius (1813-1888)", Deutsche Shakespeare-Gesellschaft West: Jahrbuch 1989, S. 387-397. (ISBN 3-592-80089-2).
- Michael Hiltscher: Shakespeares Text in Deutschland: Textkritik und Kanonfrage von den Anfängen bis zur Mitte des 19. Jahrhunderts, Frankfurt/Main: Peter Lang, 1993. (ISBN 3-631-46363-4)
