= Stephen Booth (academic) =

American academic (1933–2020)

- Born: Stephen Walter Booth; April 20, 1933; New York
- Died: November 22, 2020 (aged 87); Berkeley, California
- Education: Phillips Academy, Andover; Trinity College, Cambridge University (BA, MA); Harvard University (BA, PhD)
- Occupations: Scholar, University of California, Berkeley Professor
- Writing career
- Language: English
- Subjects: Shakespeare, Renaissance
- Notable works: Shakespeare’s Sonnets: Edited with Analytic Commentary (New Haven, CT: Yale UP, 1977)

Stephen Booth (April 20, 1933 – November 22, 2020) was a professor of English literature at the University of California, Berkeley. He was a leading Shakespearean scholar.

== Life ==
Booth studied at Harvard University (A.B., Ph.D.) and the University of Cambridge (B.A., M.A.) where he was a Marshall Scholar. He was awarded a National Endowment for the Humanities Fellowship in 1968 and a Guggenheim Fellowship for 1970-71. In 1991, Georgetown University gave him an honorary degree, Doctor of Humane Letters. He received the OBE (Order of the British Empire) in 1995.

Booth first attracted attention with his controversial 1969 essays On the Value of Hamlet and An Essay on Shakespeare's Sonnets. He pointed out the "mental gymnastics" of close reading. He notes that "all of us were brought up on the idea that what poets say is sublime – takes us beyond reason; my commentary tries to describe the physics by which we get there." Frank Kermode praised On the Value of Hamlet in the New York Review of Books in 1970 as being worth several full books of Shakespeare studies.

In 1977 he published an edition with "analytic commentary" of the sonnets for which he won both the 1977 James Russell Lowell Prize and the 1978 Explicator Prize. Shakespeare's Sonnets, Edited with Analytic Commentary was well-received, described as a "heroic enterprise" and "something of a miracle." Paul Alpers, a pre-eminent scholar of the English Renaissance said that Booth's close readings are the "equivalent of a scientific breakthrough." G. F. Waller, of the Dalhousie Review, said his edition "constitute[d] a landmark in Shakespearean criticism... [It] is a work of first-rate importance, hopefully a precursor of a long-needed revolution in our understanding of reading Shakespeare."

Booth published King Lear, Macbeth, Indefinition, and Tragedy in 1983, probably his best-known work after the study of the sonnets. His most recent book, Precious Nonsense: The Gettysburg Address, Ben Jonson's Epitaphs on His Children, and Twelfth Night explores "what is it we value literature for. And what is it in the works we value most highly that makes us value them above others like them." These questions are central to his literary analysis.

== Works ==
Among Booth's published works are:

- The Book Called Holinshed's Chronicles: An Account of Its Inception, Purposes, Contributors, Contents, Publication, Revision, and Influence on William Shakespeare. San Francisco: Book Club of California, 1969.
- "On the Value of Hamlet" in Reinterpretations of Elizabethan Drama: Selected Papers from the English Institute, ed. Norman Rabkin, 137-176. New York: Columbia U P, 1969.
- An Essay on Shakespeare's Sonnets. New Haven: Yale University Press, 1969 [paperback, 1972].
- "A Sullied, Sallied, Solid Text." The New York Review of Books 21, no. 20 (December 12, 1974) (excerpt)
- "Shakespeare in California, 1974-75." Shakespeare Quarterly 27, no. 1 (1976): 94-108.
- "Shakespeare at Valley Forge: The International Shakespeare Association Congress, 1976." Shakespeare Quarterly 27, no. 3 (1976): 231-42.
- "Syntax as Rhetoric in Richard II," Mosaic, 10:3 (Spring 1977), 87-103.
- "Shakespeare in California and Utah." Shakespeare Quarterly 28, no. 2 (1977): 229-44.
- Shakespeare's Sonnets, Edited with Analytic Commentary. New Haven, 1977 (Rev. ed., 1978; paperback, 1979; Rev.ed., 2000). (excerpts at Google Books)
- "Seven Directors at a Blow." Shakespeare Quarterly 29, no. 2 (1978): 308,10, 312-14.
- "Shakespeare in the San Francisco Bay Area." Shakespeare Quarterly 29, no 2 (1978): 267-78.
- "Speculations on Doubling in Shakespeare’s Plays," in Shakespeare: The Theatrical Dimension. Ed. Philip C. McGuire, David A. Samuelson (AMS Studies in the Renaissance, 1979).
- "Henry IV, Part Two and the Aesthetics of Failure" in The Shakespeare Plays: A Study Guide for the Second Season. Ed. John F. Andrews. Dubuque, IA: Kendall/Hunt, 1980, 89-93.
- "Exit Pursued by a Gentleman Born" in Shakespeare's Art from a Comparative Prospective, ed. W.M. Aycock (Lubbock, 1981), 51–66.
- "Milton's 'How Soon Hath Time': A Colossus in a Cherrystone." ELH 49 no. 2 (1982): 449-67 (with Jordan Flyer).
- "King Lear," "Macbeth," Indefinition and Tragedy. New Haven: Yale University Press, 1983.
- "Poetic Richness: A Preliminary Audit." Pacific Coast Philology XIX, nos.1-2 (1984): 68-78.
- "The Shakespearean Actor as Kamikaze Pilot." Shakespeare Quarterly 36, no. 5 (1985): 553-70.
- "Twelfth Night 1.1.: The Audience as Malvolio," in Shakespeare’s ‘Rough Magic’: Renaissance Essays in Honor of C. L. Barber. Ed. P. Erickson & C. Kahn (University of Delaware Press, 1985), 149-167.
- "The Best Othello I Ever Saw", Shakespeare Quarterly 40, no. 3 (1989): 332-36.
- "Liking Julius Caesar." Living with Shakespeare [pamphlet]. Ashland, Oregon: Southern Oregon State College Center for Shakespeare Studies, 1991.
- "The Shenandoah Shakespeare Express." Shakespeare Quarterly 43, no. 4 (1992): 476-83.
- "Close Reading without Readings" in Shakespeare Reread: The Texts in New Contexts, ed. Russ McDonald (Ithaca: Cornell, 1994), 42–55. (excerpts at Google Books)
- "The Coherences of 1 Henry IV and of Hamlet" in Shakespeare Set Free: Teaching Hamlet and 1 Henry IV, ed. Peggy O'Brien (New York: Washington Square Press, 1994), 32–46.
- "Twelfth Night and Othello: Those Extraordinary Twins" in Shakespeare Set Free: Teaching Twelfth Night and Othello, ed. Peggy O'Brien (New York: Washington Square Press, 1995), 22–32.
- "The Function of Criticism at the Present Time and All Others." Shakespeare Quarterly 41, no. 2 (1990): 262-68. Reprinted in Teaching Literature: A Collection of Essays on Theory and Practice, ed. L.A. Jacobus (1996).
- "Precious Nonsense: The Gettysburg Address, Ben Jonson's Epitaphs on His Children, and Twelfth Night." Berkeley: University of California Press, 1998.
- "Shakespeare's Language and the Language of Shakespeare's Time." Shakespeare Survey 50 (1998), 1-17. (excerpts at Google Books)
- "A Long, Dull Poem by William Shakespeare." Shakespeare Studies 25 (1998): 229-37. (excerpts at Google Books)
- "On the Aesthetics of Acting," in Shakespearean Illuminations: Essays in Honor of Marvin Rosenberg, ed. Jay L. Halio and Hugh Richmond, 255–66. Cranbury, NJ: Associated University Presses, 1998.
- "The Physics of Hamlet’s ‘Rogue and Peasant Slave’ Speech" in A Certain Text: Close Readings and Textual Studies on Shakespeare and Others in Honor of Thomas Clayton, ed., Linda Anderson and Janis Lull, 75–93. Cranbury, NJ: Associated University Presses, 2002.
- "A Discourse on the Witty Partition of A Midsummer Night's Dream. In Inside Shakespeare: Essays on the Blackfriars Stage, ed. Paul Menzer, 216-22. Selingrove, PA: Susquehanna University Press, 2006.
- "On the Eventfulness of Hero and Leander. In Christopher Marlowe the Craftsman: Lives, Stage and Page, ed. Sarah K. Scott and M. L. Stapleton, 125-36. Burlington, VT: Ashgate Publishing, 2010.
- "Who Doesn't Listen in Shakespeare?" in Who Hears in Shakespeare? Auditory Worlds on Stage and Screen, ed. Laury Magnus and Walter W. Cannon, 235-40. Madison, NJ: Fairleigh Dickinson University Press, 2012.

== Honors and awards ==
- James Russell Lowell Prize from the Modern Language Association for Shakespeare's Sonnets (1977)
- Distinguished Teaching Award from the University of California at Berkeley (1982)
