= John Stevens (musicologist) =

English musicologist, literary scholar (1921–2002)

John Stevens CBE FBA
- Born: John Edgar Stevens; 8 October 1921; London, England
- Died: 14 February 2002 (aged 80); Cambridge, England
- Awards: Derek Allen Prize (1989)

Academic background
- Education: Magdalene College, Cambridge

Academic work
- Discipline: Musicology
- Sub-discipline: Music history; medieval music; Renaissance music
- Institutions: Magdalene College, Cambridge; Faculty of English, University of Cambridge

John Edgar Stevens, CBE, FBA (8 October 1921 – 14 February 2002) was an English musicologist, literary scholar and historian, whose research focused on the words of medieval and Renaissance music. He was the Professor of Medieval and Renaissance English at the University of Cambridge from 1978 to 1988.

== Early life and education ==
Born in south London on 8 October 1921, Stevens's father was a violinist and his mother a mathematics graduate. He attended Christ's Hospital on a scholarship before studying classics at Magdalene College, Cambridge. He was there for a year (1940–41) before his studies were interrupted by service in the Second World War: he served in the Royal Naval Volunteer Reserve and reached the temporary rank of lieutenant. On demobilisation in 1946, he returned to Cambridge, this time reading English. He graduated with a starred first Bachelor of Arts (BA) degree in 1948. He then undertook research for a Doctor of Philosophy (PhD) degree, supervised by Thurston Dart; his PhD was awarded in 1953.

== Career, research and honours ==
In 1948, Stevens was elected a bye-fellow of Magdalene College, Cambridge; in 1950, he became a research fellow and, in 1953, a full fellow of the college, where he remained until retirement in 1988 (the last seven years as the college's president). At the University of Cambridge, he was a University Lecturer in English from 1954, then the Reader in English and Musical History from 1974 to 1978, when he was appointed Professor of Medieval and Renaissance English (remaining in the chair until he retired in 1988).

Despite the fact that he held teaching posts in English, Stevens's main academic interests and greatest contributions to scholarship were in the fields of musicology and music history. He was especially focused on medieval monophonic songs in Latin, Middle English, Old French and other languages. For the Musica Britannica series, he authored Mediaeval Carols (1952; 2nd ed., 1958), Music at the Court of Henry VIII (1962) and Early Tudor Songs and Carols (1975). He also wrote Music and Poetry in the Early Tudor Court (1961) and Medieval Romance (1973), the latter his only book about literary criticism, and Words and Music in the Middle Ages (1986); he edited, with Richard Axton, Medieval French Plays (1971). In his later life, Stevens began work on a project exploring medieval England's tri-lingual songs by editing every one known from before 1300. It proved too great a task, but he turned his attention to editing the Cambridge University Library manuscript Ff. 1. 17(1); with the support of others, he was able to see much of the editing done. After his death, Margaret Bent, Richard Axton, Karl Reichl, Bonnie Blackburn and others brought it together as The Later Cambridge Songs: An English Song Collection of the Twelfth Century (2005).

He was chairman of the Plainsong and Medieval Music Society from 1988 to 1995.

== Personal life ==
In 1946, Stevens married Charlotte Ethel Mary (née Somner). Together they had four children: two sons and two daughters.

He died on 14 February 2002 in Cambridge, England, aged 80.

== Honours ==
Stevens was elected a Fellow of the British Academy (FBA) in 1975 and was appointed a Commander of the Order of the British Empire (CBE) in the 1980 Birthday Honours; he was awarded an honorary doctorate by the University of Exeter in 1989, the same year that he received the British Academy's Derek Allen Prize.
