= Helen Cooper (literary scholar) =

British literary scholar (born 1947)

Helen Cooper FBA
- Born: 6 February 1947 (age 79); Nottingham, England
- Occupations: Academic, literary critic

Academic background
- Education: Nottingham Girls' High School
- Alma mater: New Hall, Cambridge
- Thesis: The mediaeval background of English Renaissance pastoral literature (1971)

Academic work
- Sub-discipline: Medieval literature; Renaissance literature
- Institutions: New Hall, Cambridge; University College, Oxford; Magdelene College, Cambridge

Elizabeth Helen Cooper, FBA (born 6 February 1947), known as Helen Cooper, is a British literary scholar. From 2004 to 2014, she was Professor of Medieval and Renaissance English at the University of Cambridge, and a fellow of Magdalene College, Cambridge.

== Early life and education ==
Cooper was born on 6 February 1947 in Nottingham, England. Her parents were Percy Edward Kent, an exploration geologist, and Betty Kent. She was educated at Nottingham Girls' High School, an all-girls private school. She studied at New Hall, Cambridge, graduating with a Bachelor of Arts (BA) degree in 1968: as per tradition, her BA was promoted to a Master of Arts (MA Cantab) degree. She remained at New Hall to undertake postgraduate study, one of her supervisors was Jack A. W. Bennett, and she completed her Doctor of Philosophy (PhD) degree in 1971. Her doctoral thesis was titled "The mediaeval background of English Renaissance pastoral literature".

== Academic career ==
From 1971 to 1974, Cooper was a junior research fellow at New Hall, Cambridge. In 1978, she was elected a fellow at University College, Oxford: she was the first woman to become a fellow at the formerly all-male college. During this time, she was also a lecturer in English at the University of Oxford, rising to become chair of its Faculty of English. In 1996, she was awarded a Title of Distinction by the University of Oxford as Professor of English Language and Literature. From 2000 to 2002, she was also the president of the New Chaucer Society.

In 2004, Cooper moved to the University of Cambridge, having been appointed to its Chair of Medieval and Renaissance English. She was also elected a professorial fellow of Magdalene College, Cambridge. She retired from full-time academics in 2014, and was appointed Professor Emeritus by Oxford and made a Life Fellow at Magdalene College.

Her research is in the continuity of literature across the Middle Ages and Renaissance. Her latest book is Shakespeare and the Medieval World, published in 2010 as part of the Arden Shakespeare series.

== Personal life ==
In 1970, she married Michael Cooper, a fellow academic: he died in 2007. Together they had two daughters.

== Honours ==
In 2001, Cooper was awarded an honorary Doctor of Letters (DLitt) degree by Washington and Lee University in Virginia. In 2006, she was elected a Fellow of the British Academy (FBA), the United Kingdom's national academy for the humanities and social sciences. In 2016 she delivered the British Academy's Sir Israel Gollancz Memorial Lecture.

== Selected works ==
- Cooper, H. (1978). Pastoral: Mediaeval into Renaissance. D. S. Brewer
- Cooper, H. (1983). The Structure of the Canterbury Tales. Duckworth and University of Georgia Press
- Cooper, H (1996) Oxford Guides to Chaucer: The Canterbury Tales, Oxford University Press.
- Cooper, H. & Mapstone, S. (1997). The Long Fifteenth Century: Essays for Douglas Gray Counter-Romance: Civil Strife and Father-killing in the Prose Romances. Oxford University Press
- Cooper, H. (1998). Sir Thomas Malory: Le Morte Darthur – Winchester Manuscript. Oxford University Press (Oxford World's Classics)
- Cooper, H. (1999). The Four Last Things in Chaucer and Dante: Ugolino in the House of Rumour. New Medieval Literatures 3
- Cooper, H. (2003). Chaucerian Representation; Chaucerian Poetics. In: New Readings of Chaucer's Poetry, ed. Robert G. Benson and Susan J. Ridyard, Chaucer Studies. D. S. Brewer
- Cooper, H. (2004). Speaking for the Victim. In: Writing War: Medieval Literary Responses to Warfare, eds. Corinne Saunders, Francois Le Saux and Neil Wright. D. S. Brewer
- Cooper, H. (2004). The English Romance in Time: Transforming Motifs from Geoffrey of Monmouth to the Death of Shakespeare. Oxford University Press
- Cooper, H. (2010). Shakespeare and the Medieval World, Arden Companions to Shakespeare. A & C Black.

Academic offices
Preceded by James Simpson	Professor of Medieval and Renaissance English; University of Cambridge; 2004 to 2014	Succeeded by Nicolette Zeeman
