= Magdalene College, Cambridge =

College of the University of Cambridge

Coordinates: 52°12′38″N 0°06′59″E

Magdalene College
- University of Cambridge
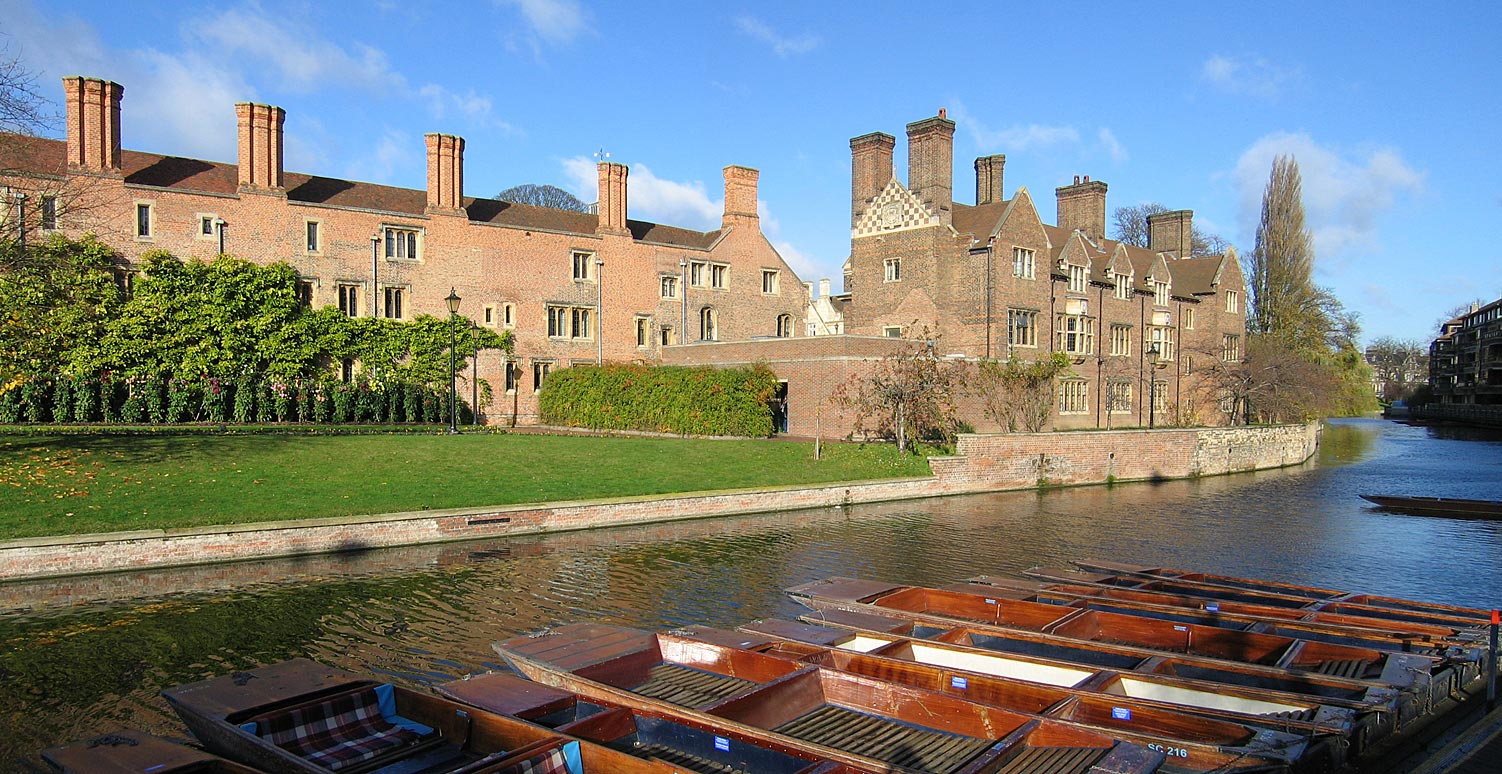
- Magdalene College on the River Cam

- Arms of Magdalene College, being the arms of Thomas Audley, 1st Baron Audley of Walden. Blazon: Quarterly per pale indented Or and azure, on a bend of the second between in sinister chief and dexter base an eagle displayed a fret between two martlets of the first.
Scarf colours: navy, with two equally-spaced narrow lavender stripes
- Location: Magdalene Street
- Full name: The College of Saint Mary Magdalene in the University of Cambridge
- Latin name: Collegium Sanctae Mariae Magdalenae
- Abbreviation: M
- Motto: Garde ta Foy (Old French)
- Motto in English: Keep your faith
- Founders: John Lytlington, Abbot of Crowland (1428); Thomas, 1st Baron Audley (1542)
- Established: 1428; 598 years ago Refounded 1542
- Named after: Mary Magdalene
- Former names: Buckingham College (1428–1542)
- Sister college: Magdalen College, Oxford
- Master: Sir Christopher Greenwood
- Undergraduates: 383 (2022-23)
- Postgraduates: 199 (2022-23)
- Endowment: £71.4m (2022)
- Visitor: Richard Neville, 11th Baron Braybrooke
- Website: www.magd.cam.ac.uk
- JCR: www.magd.cam.ac.uk/college-life/junior-combination-room-jcr
- MCR: www.magd.cam.ac.uk/college-life/middle-combination-room-mcr
- Boat club: Magdalene Boat Club

Map
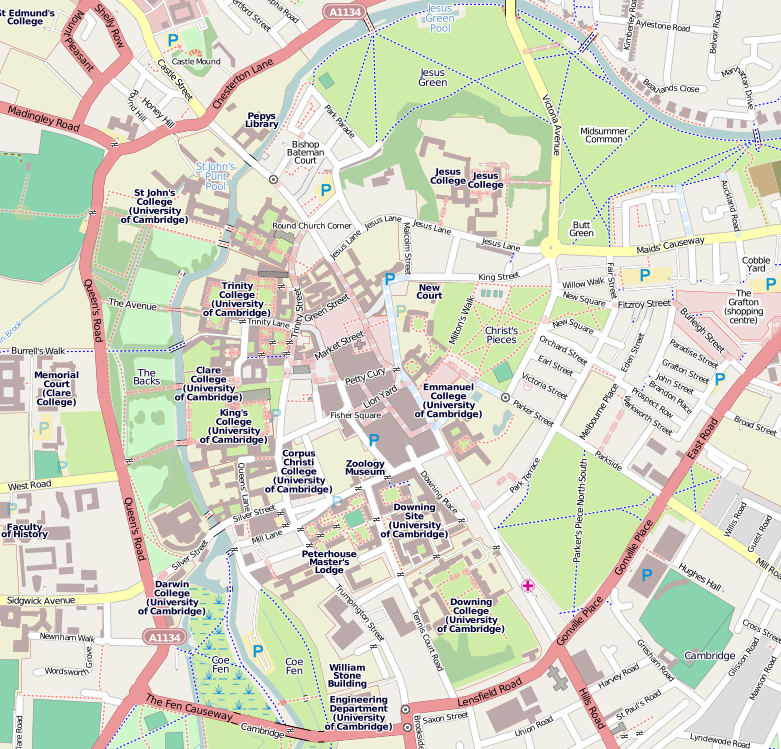
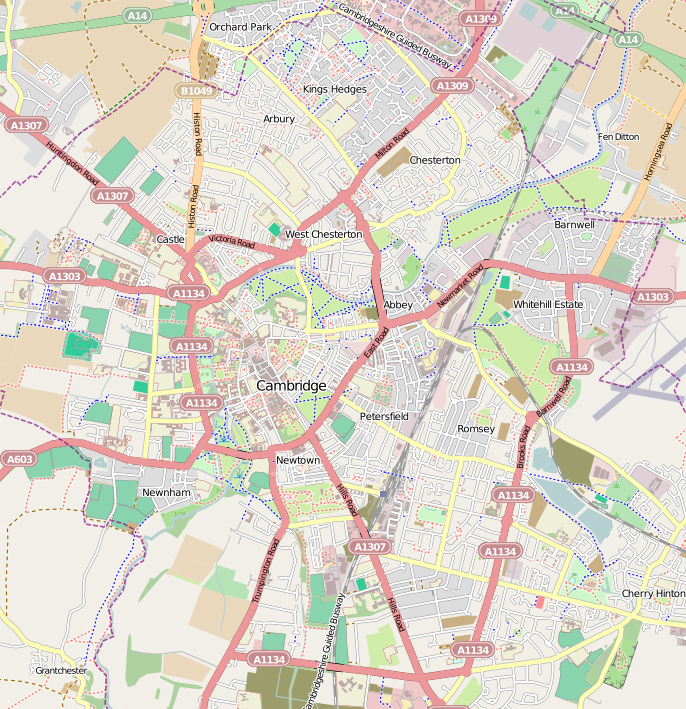
- Location within Central Cambridge Location within Cambridge

Magdalene College (/ˈmɔːdlɪn/ MAWD-lin) is a constituent college of the University of Cambridge. The college was founded in 1428 as a Benedictine hostel, in time coming to be known as Buckingham College, before being refounded in 1542 as the College of St Mary Magdalene.

Magdalene counted some of the most prominent men in the realm among its benefactors, including Britain's premier noble the Duke of Norfolk, the Duke of Buckingham and Lord Chief Justice Christopher Wray. Thomas Audley, Lord Chancellor under Henry VIII, was responsible for the refoundation of the college and also established its motto—garde ta foy (Old French: "keep your faith"). Audley's successors in the mastership and as benefactors of the college were, however, prone to dire ends; several benefactors were arraigned at various stages on charges of high treason and executed.

The college remains one of the smaller in the university, numbering around 400 undergraduate and 200 graduate students. It has maintained strong academic performance over the past decade, achieving an average of ninth in the Tompkins Table and coming second in 2015. Magdalene is home to the Pepys Library, which holds the collection of rare books and manuscripts that belonged to the English diarist Samuel Pepys, an alumnus of the college.

== History ==
=== Buckingham College ===
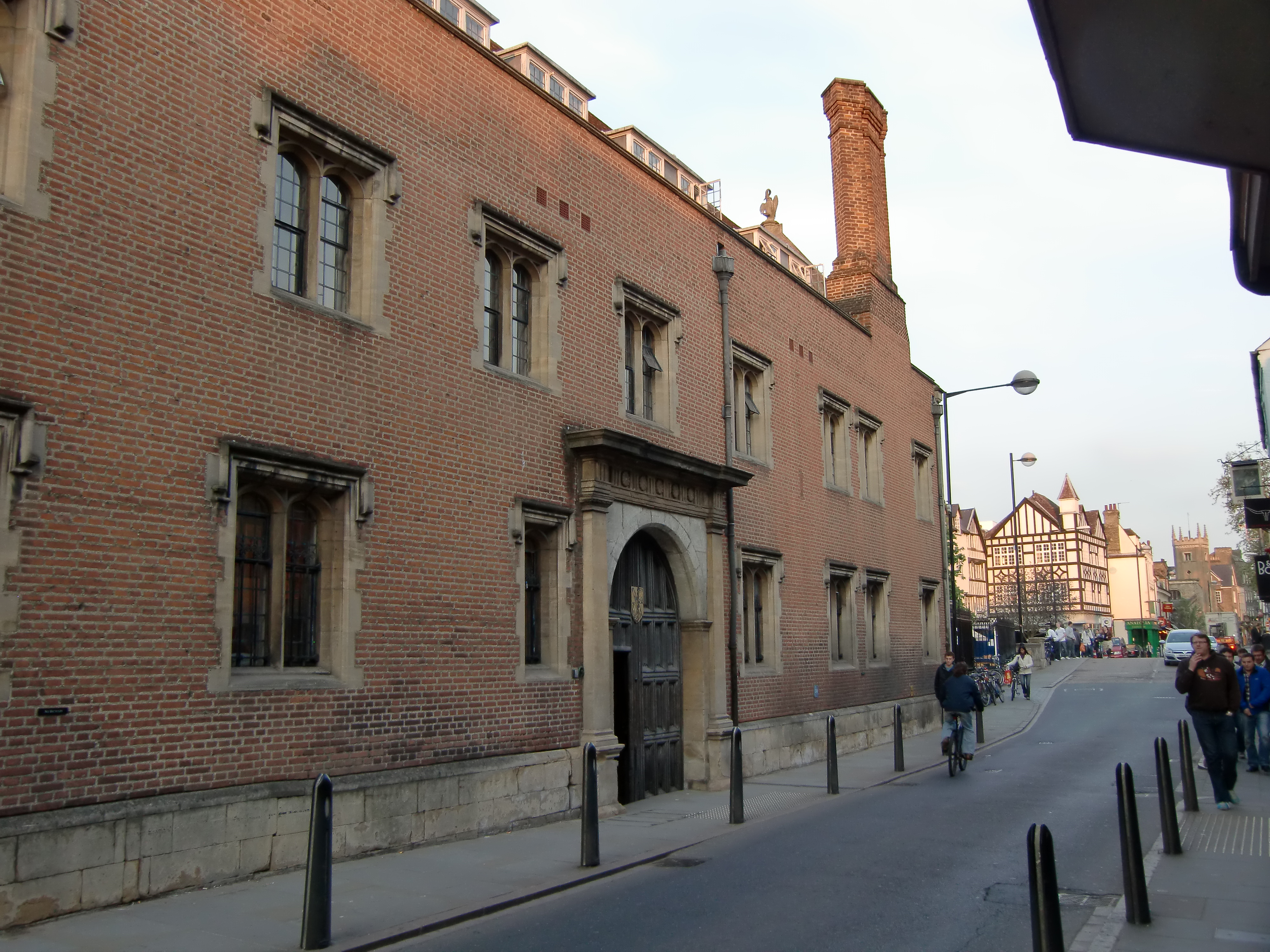
Street front of Magdalene College porter's lodge, with its 16th-century architecture retained

Magdalene College was first founded in 1428 as Monk's Hostel, which hosted Benedictine student monks. The secluded location of the hostel was chosen because it was separated from the town centre by the River Cam and protected by Cambridge Castle. The main buildings of the college were constructed in the 1470s under the leadership of John de Wisbech, then Abbot of Crowland. Under the patronage of Henry Stafford, 2nd Duke of Buckingham, the institution was renamed Buckingham College.

In the 16th century, the Church of England broke away from the Papacy. With the subsequent Dissolution of the Monasteries, the parent abbey of Buckingham College, Crowland Abbey, was dissolved. However, the college remained in operation.

=== Refoundation ===
Walden Abbey, one of the Benedictine abbeys associated with Buckingham College, came into the possession of Thomas Audley after the Dissolution of the Monasteries. On 3 April 1542 Audley refounded Buckingham College as the College of Saint Mary Magdalene. Derived from Audley were the arms of Magdalene, including the motto Garde Ta Foy (from Old French for "keep your faith"), and the wyvern as the crest.

Thomas Audley died in 1544 aged 56, only two years after he re-founded the college. He donated to the college seven acres of property at Aldgate in London, which was his reward from Henry VIII for disposing of Anne Boleyn. This property would have brought enormous income had it been retained by the college. However, under the conspiracy of the Elizabethan banker Benedict Spinola, the property was permanently alienated to the Crown in 1574. The transaction involved Spinola luring the master and fellows of the time to accept an increase in the annual rental from £9 to £15 a year in exchange for the property. The loss of the Aldgate property left the college in extreme poverty, and the street front of the college was only completed in the 1580s under the generosity of Christopher Wray, then Lord Chief Justice of the Queen's Bench. The transaction was "almost certainly illegal", and was contested multiple times without success. The first and most famous such lawsuit, the Earl of Oxford's case, was pursued in 1615 by Barnabas Gooch, who was master of the college between 1604 and 1626. This court case landed Gooch and the senior fellow in prison for two years. Gooch was subsequently offered £10,000 as a compromise, which he refused to accept. When the Quayside development site of Magdalene College was completed in 1989, a gargoyle of Spinola which spits water into the Cam was installed as a "revenge at last"; the gargoyle was designed by Peter Fluck and Roger Law, the creators of Spitting Image.

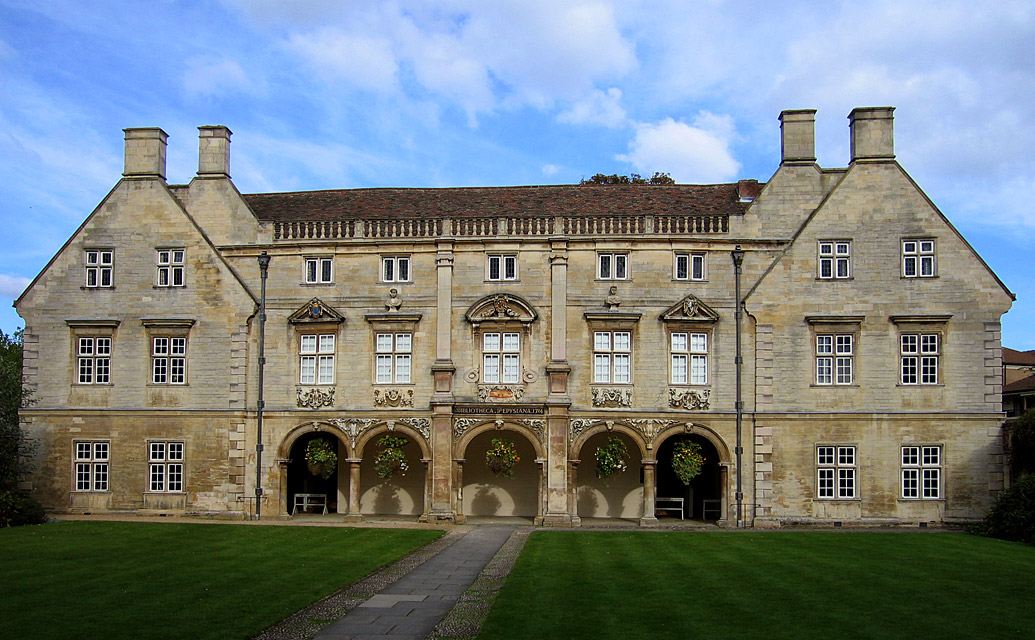
The Pepys Building houses the Pepys Library

In 1650, Samuel Pepys joined the college. He is best known for his private diary which provided a major eyewitness account for the Great Fire of London of 1666. Pepys was remembered by the Pepys Library, built around 1700, where the original manuscripts of his diaries and naval records are kept, in addition to his collection of printed books and engravings in their original bookcases. Pepys stipulated in his will that the library was to be left to Magdalene, and have been kept at the college since their donation by Pepys's nephew, John Jackson, in 1724. The building was also home to Magdalene College library, until the construction of the New Library.

=== Enlightenment ===
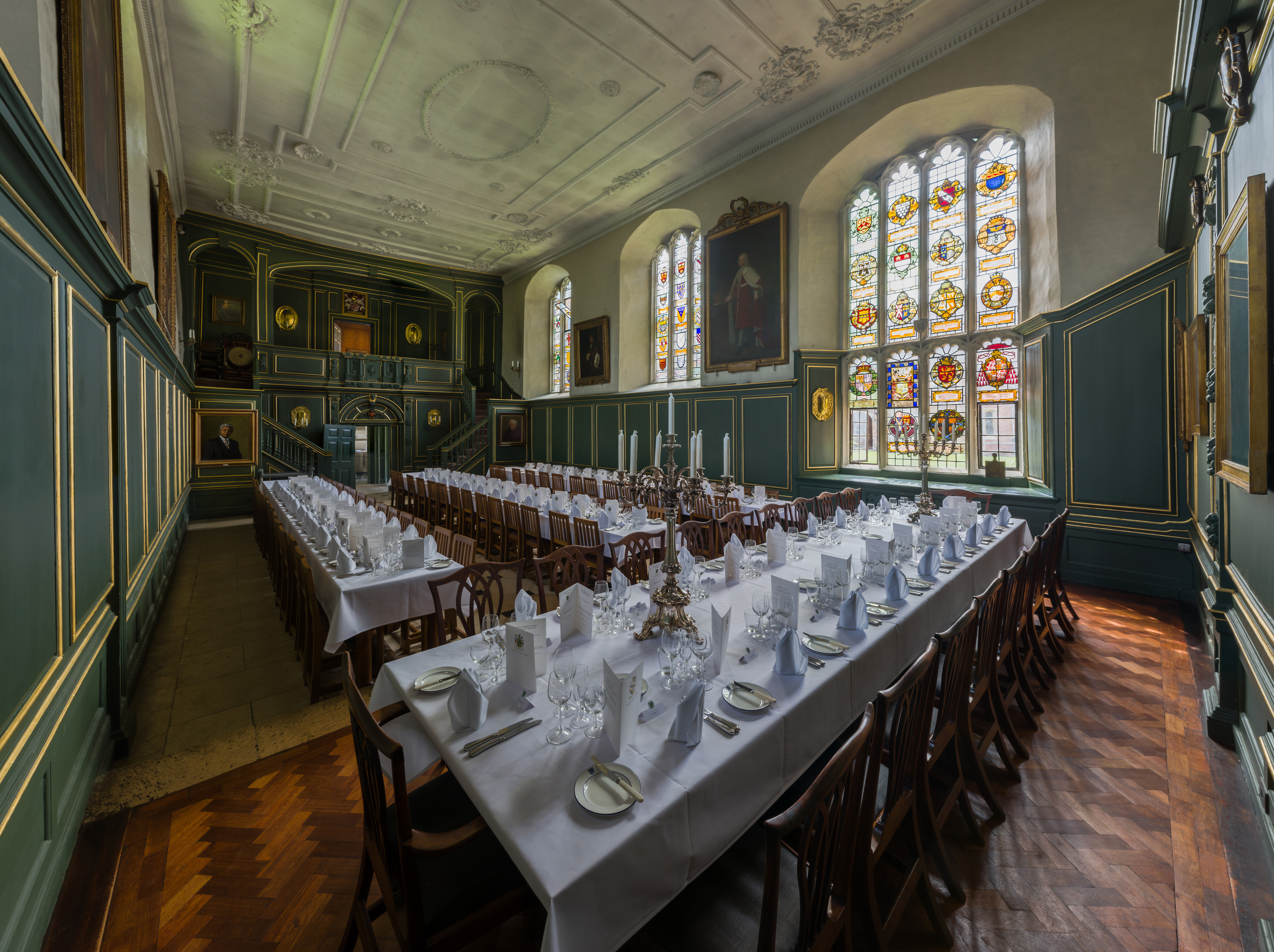
The hall in 2014

Daniel Waterland, a theologian by training, became master of the college in 1714 and prescribed a new curriculum for undergraduate students at Magdalene. His new curriculum included Mathematics, Newtonian Physics, Geography and Astronomy, as well as Classics, Logic and Metaphysics. Waterland was also successful in attracting financial aid for the college, including funds for scholarships. The mathematician Edward Waring was among those who joined the college during this period.

In 1781, Peter Peckard, one of the earliest abolitionists, became master of Magdalene. The Zong massacre of 1781 prompted Peckard to speak strongly against slave trade in his sermons, some of which were published as tracts and pamphlets. Peckard set the college on the course of achieving a wider reputation of scholarship and sound thinking, and was later appointed as vice-chancellor of Cambridge University.

Magdalene continued to be a liberal college through the Victorian era. The college had more liberal admissions policies than most, admitting Arthur Cohen, the first practising Jew to graduate from Cambridge. During the same period, Magdalene also admitted Catholic students such as Charles Januarius Acton, and Asian students who were excluded from many other colleges until after the First World War.

=== Modern development ===
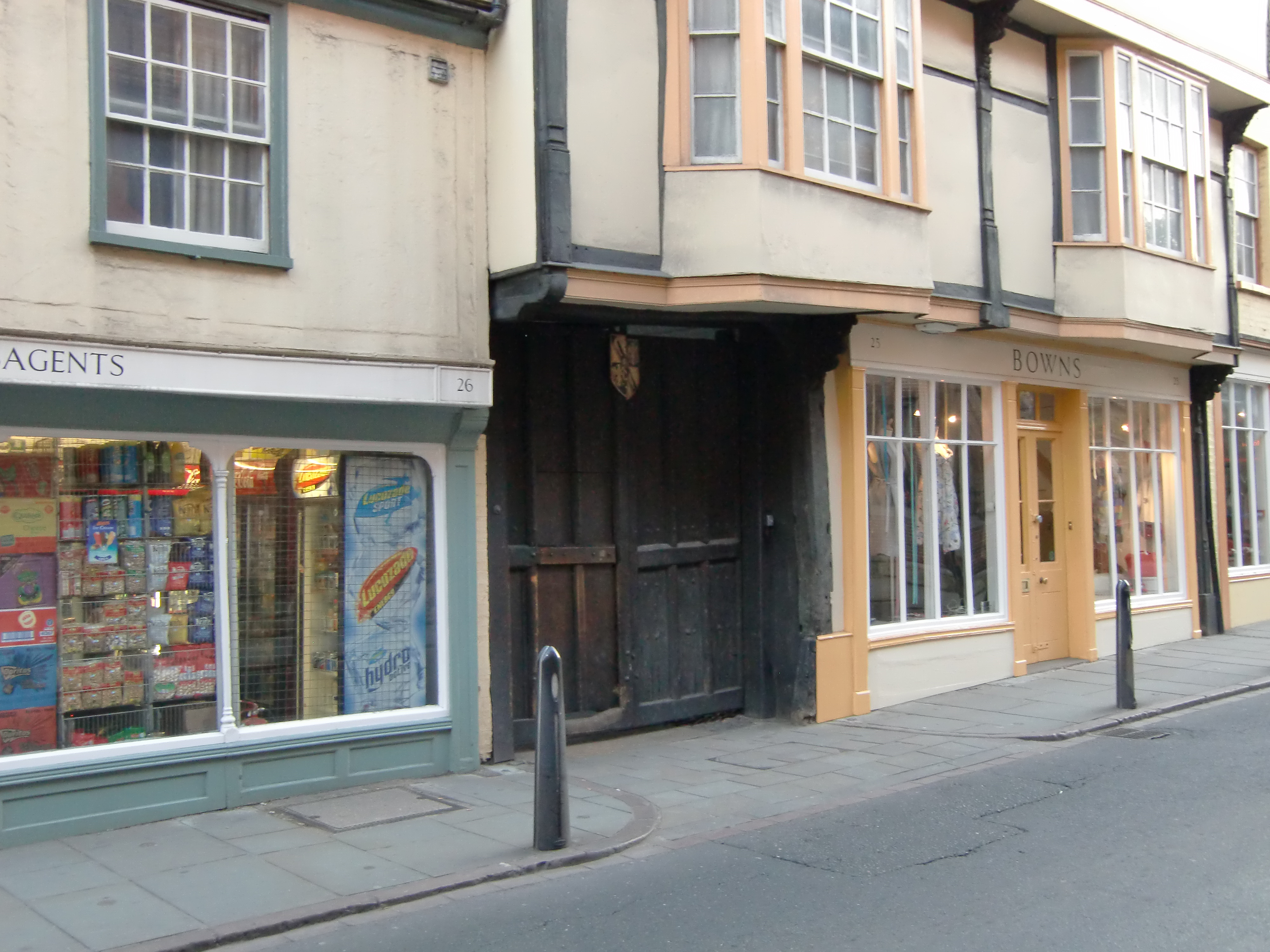
The wooden gate leading to the Magdalene Village

The modern development of Magdalene was shaped by A. C. Benson, master from 1915 to 1925. His enthusiasm and attention to detail produced outstanding pieces of poems, essays and literary criticism; his diaries were also studied by many later critics. His financial generosity effected significant impact on the modern appearance of the college grounds: at least 20 inscriptions around the college refer to him. In 1930, Benson Court was constructed and named after him.

From 1972, the previously all-male colleges in Cambridge started admitting women, the first three being Churchill, Clare and King's. In 1985, Oriel College, Oxford, admitted women, making Magdalene the only surviving all-male Oxbridge college. The following year, Magdalene made the decision to admit women and become co-residential. When women joined the college in 1988, some male undergraduates protested by wearing black arm-bands and flying the college flag at half-mast.

=== 21st century ===
Magdalene has an evenly mixed student body in terms of sex, race and education background. In recent years, Magdalene's access programme has attracted many applicants from state schools, especially from North West England; and the college's close affiliation with international students' bursaries such as the Prince Philip Scholarship and the Jardine Foundation has attracted many applicants from Southeast Asia, most notably Wong Yan Lung who went on to become Secretary for Justice for Hong Kong.

In October 2022, the new library designed by Niall McLaughlin Architects won the Stirling Prize for excellence in architecture.

The hereditary visitor of the college is Baron Braybrooke ex officio as heir of the founder of the college, Lord Audley.

== Buildings and grounds ==
Magdalene College is located at the bend of the River Cam on the northwestern side of the town centre, at the foot of Castle Hill. The college was deliberately built on the opposite end of Magdalene Bridge from the town centre so that the Benedictine student-monks would be secluded from the business and temptations of the town. As such, it was the first Cambridge college to be built on the northwestern side of the Cam. The college's main site was previously settled during the Roman occupation of England.

The college's buildings are distributed on both sides of the river, and is roughly divided into four areas: the main site, where the oldest buildings including the porter's lodge and the Pepys Library are located; The Village, which was built in the 1930s and consists exclusively of student accommodation; Quayside, built on the southeastern side of the river in the 1980s as an investment project which also provides student accommodation; and Cripps Court, built in the 2000s for extra conference facilities and accommodation.

Magdalene's old buildings are representative of the college's ramshackle growth from a monks' foundation into a centre of education. It is also distinctive in that most of the old buildings are in brick rather than stone (save for the frontage of the Pepys Building). Magdalene Street divides the ancient courts from more recent developments. One of the accommodation blocks in the newer part of the college was built by Sir Edwin Lutyens in the early 1930s. Opened in 2005, Cripps Court, on Chesterton Road, features new undergraduate rooms and conference facilities.

=== Main site ===
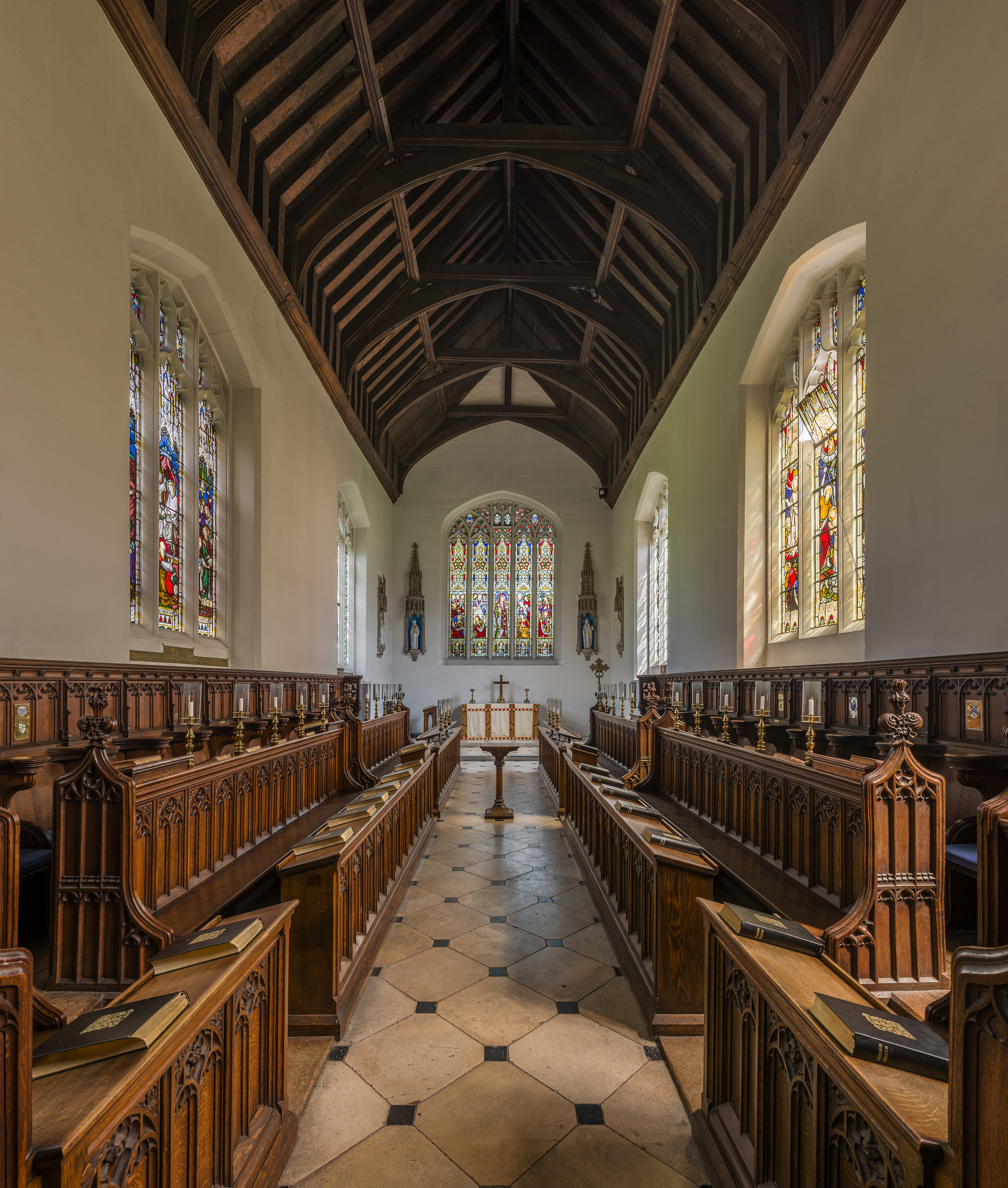
Interior of the chapel

The main site of the college is the area bounded by Magdalene Street, Chesterton Lane and the River Cam. It was the original area of college buildings from the 1470s. This area includes Magdalene's First Court, Second Court, Fellows' Garden, and the buildings surrounding them such as the porters' lodge, the Master's Lodge, and the Pepys Library.

==== Porters' lodge and First Court ====
Situated on the north-east side of Magdalene Street is the porters' lodge, where mail to members of the college is delivered and distributed. Past the gatehouse by which the porters' lodge is situated lies First Court. The First Court was the earliest court to be built. From 1760 the Court was faced with stucco, but most of the buildings were restored in a project between 1953 and 1966. The chapel was the first to be built in around 1470, while the gatehouse including the porters' lodge and the street-front of the college did not exist until 1585.

The chapel lies in the north range of First Court, and its original construction dates to 1470-72. However, restoration works meant that little of the original chapel other than the original roof remains. Since the college is dedicated to Mary Magdalene, much of the chapel's artwork describes her story. The glass windows on the eastern wall of the chapel are dedicated to the encounters between Mary Magdalene and Jesus Christ around the time of the crucifixion of Jesus: anointing Jesus with her jug of ointment, watching the crucifixion, weeping at the tomb and recognising Jesus after his resurrection. Compared to most other Cambridge colleges of medieval origin, Magdalene's chapel is smaller in line with the college's relatively small population. Despite its smaller size, however, the chapel's physical proportions are in keeping with those of other medieval Oxbridge college chapels, reflecting the traditional layout of Solomon's Temple: the ratio of Magdalene's antechapel, choir, and sanctuary (1:4:2) matches that of the Temple's porch, holy place, and holy of holies. In 2000, the chapel received a new Baroque-style pipe organ built by Goetze & Gwynn.

Past the chapel, the hall separates the First Court to the west and the Second Court to the east. This is where formal dinners are served. The hall itself was built in the early 16th century, again with many later refurbishments but never gas or electric lighting — Magdalene's hall is unique in Oxbridge in relying solely on candlelight. To the far end of the hall is the High Table, placed on a platform one step above ground level, where fellows and their guests dine. Students dine at three long benches in front of and perpendicular to the High Table and spanning to the entrance. Flanking the entrance is a double staircase leading to a minstrels' gallery and the senior combination room. The walls of the hall are decorated with 15 portraits of notable benefactors and past members.

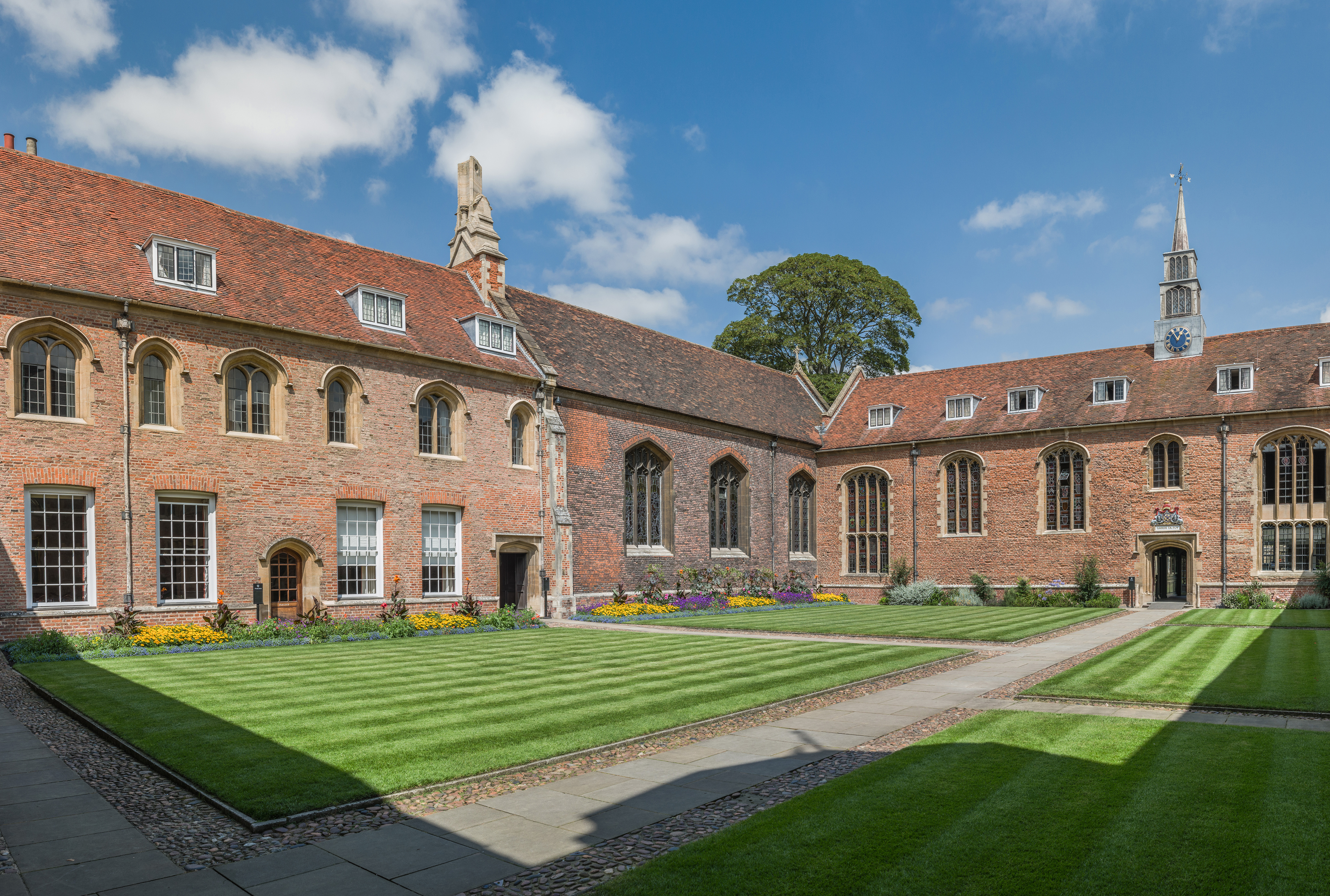
First Court

Both the old and new Master's Lodges are located just to the north of First Court. The old Master's Lodge, connected to the building in which the porters' lodge is situated, was built in the 16th century and vacated in 1835. The Master's Lodge then moved to a new location about 50m north of the previous location. This new lodge was rebuilt in 1967 to give the Master a less grandiose, but more comfortable residence. The first Master's Lodge is now known as Old Lodge and is predominantly used for student accommodation. A number of senior fellows and students have rooms in the buildings surrounding First Court, including the Bursar, the Senior Tutor, and the Chaplain, as well as the President of the Middle Combination Room, the President of the Junior Combination Room, and the Captain of Boats.

==== Second Court and gardens ====
Past the formal hall, the Second Court is marked by the Pepys Building, where the Pepys Library is housed. The architect and polymath Robert Hooke, best known for coining the idea of a biological cell, participated in designing this building in 1677, and construction carried on from then until the 1700s because of the college's lack of money. The inscription on the arch in front of the building, Bibliotheca Pepysiana 1724, refers to the year in which the Pepys Diary was donated to the college, rather than the year in which the building was completed. Because of the famous Pepys Diary, the Pepys Library became a popular tourist destination in Cambridge. The ground and basement levels of the Pepys Building hosted the college library where undergraduate course books were available. The Pepys Building was constructed in such a way that it would provide a good view of the Fellows' Garden. Construction of a new College Library began in 2018; the new building, designed by Niall McLaughlin Architects, offers three times more space.

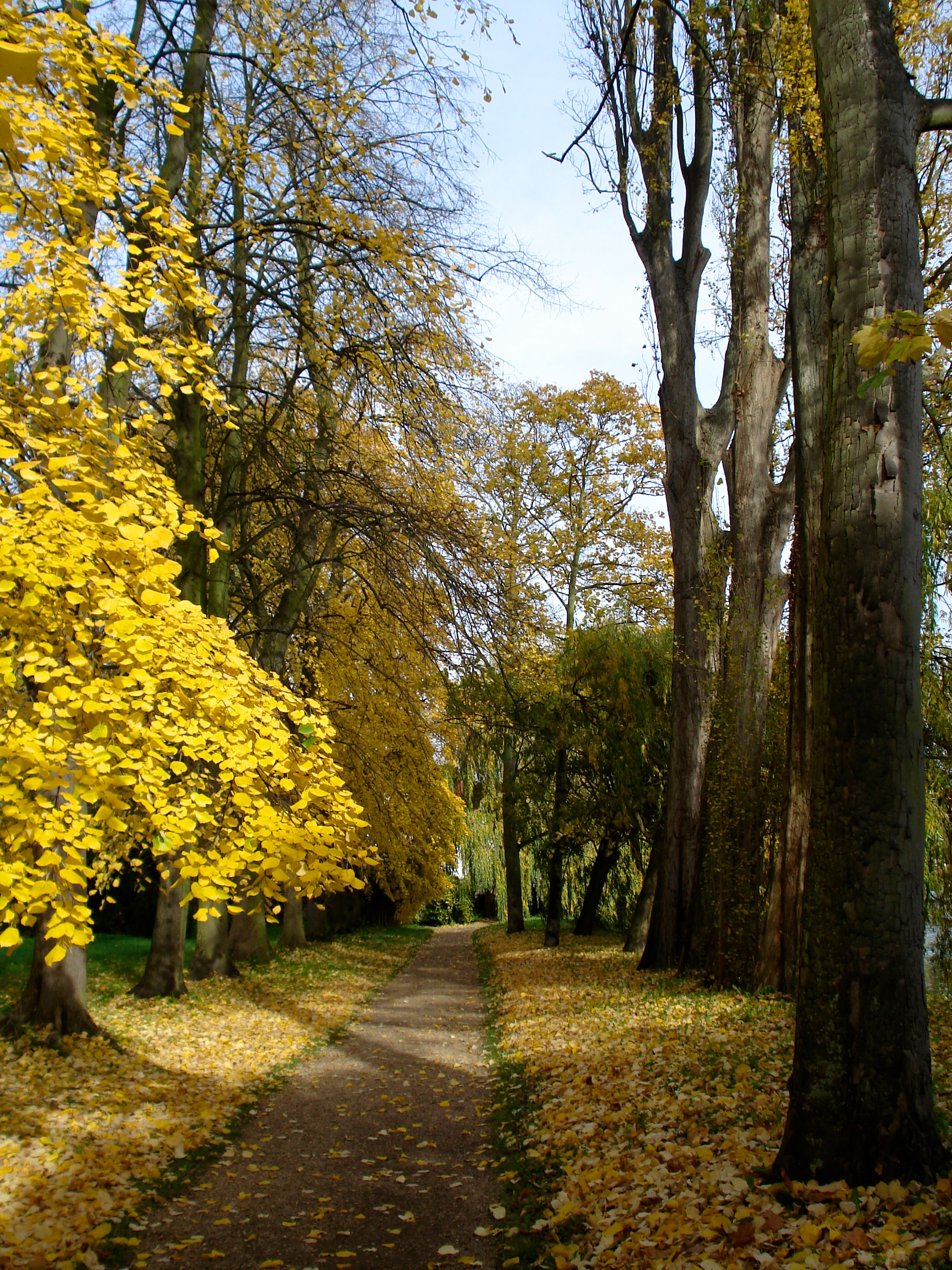
Fellows' Garden Path in autumn

Also situated on Second Court is Bright's Building, named after Mynors Bright, notable for having deciphered the Pepys Diary. It was built in 1908–09 by Aston Webb to provide extra accommodation to host increasing numbers of undergraduate students. The largest room in Bright's Building is Ramsay Hall, named after Allen Beville Ramsay. The room was intended to be a lecture room, but it was refurbished in 1949 to become the college's canteen.

The Fellows' Garden, situated behind Pepys Building, included a Roman-era flood barrier bank which became today's Monk's Walk, a raised footpath leading from the south side of Pepys Building to the exit of the Fellows' Garden on Chesterton Lane. At the time of the college's establishment in 1428, the Fellows' Garden was a series of fishponds. The fishponds were filled between 1586 and 1609, but it was not until the 1660s that plans to cultivate a garden on the land were realised. Most of the trees planted in the original plan of the garden were chopped down and replaced in a renovation in the early 1900s, under the instruction of botanist Walter Gardiner. Many of the newly planted trees were black poplars and its variant, Lombardy poplars. Some fruit trees, such as quince, cherry and plum trees, were planted in the 1980s-90s. Squirrels, and the occasional woodpecker may be spotted in the garden; there are also a few flowerbeds in the garden in which the gardeners grow seasonal flowers. Near the northwest corner of the Fellows' Garden lies a Victorian pet cemetery with several gravestones and statues of departed dogs and cats of the College.

Adjacent to the Fellows' Garden are two other gardens: the Master's Garden, which is part of the Master's Lodge and separated from the Fellows' Garden by a brick wall, and the River Court, a small, brick-paved patch of land between Bright's Building and the River Cam, where seasonal flowers are on display in the flowerbeds.

=== Village ===
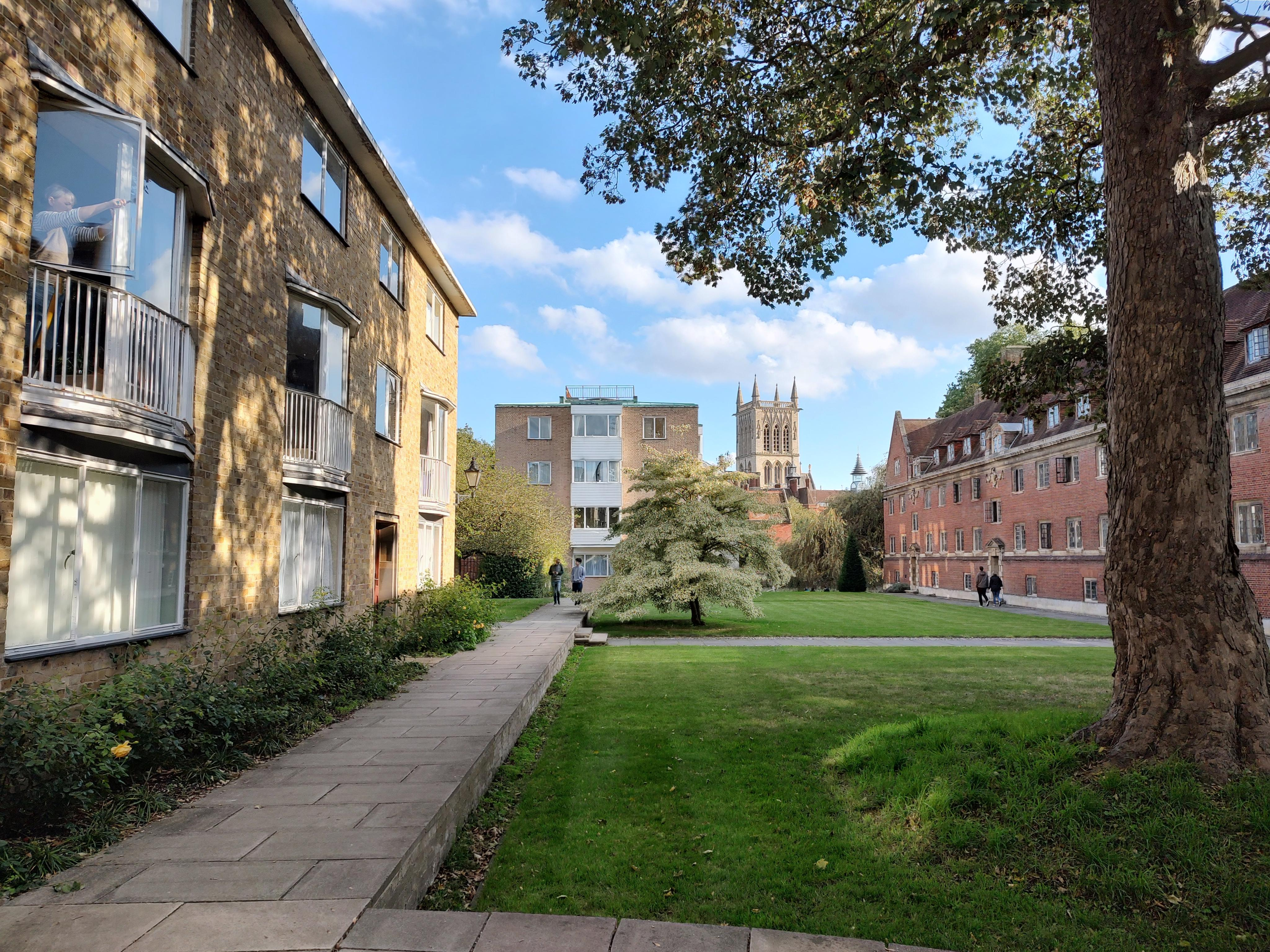
Benson Court with the Lutyens building on the right

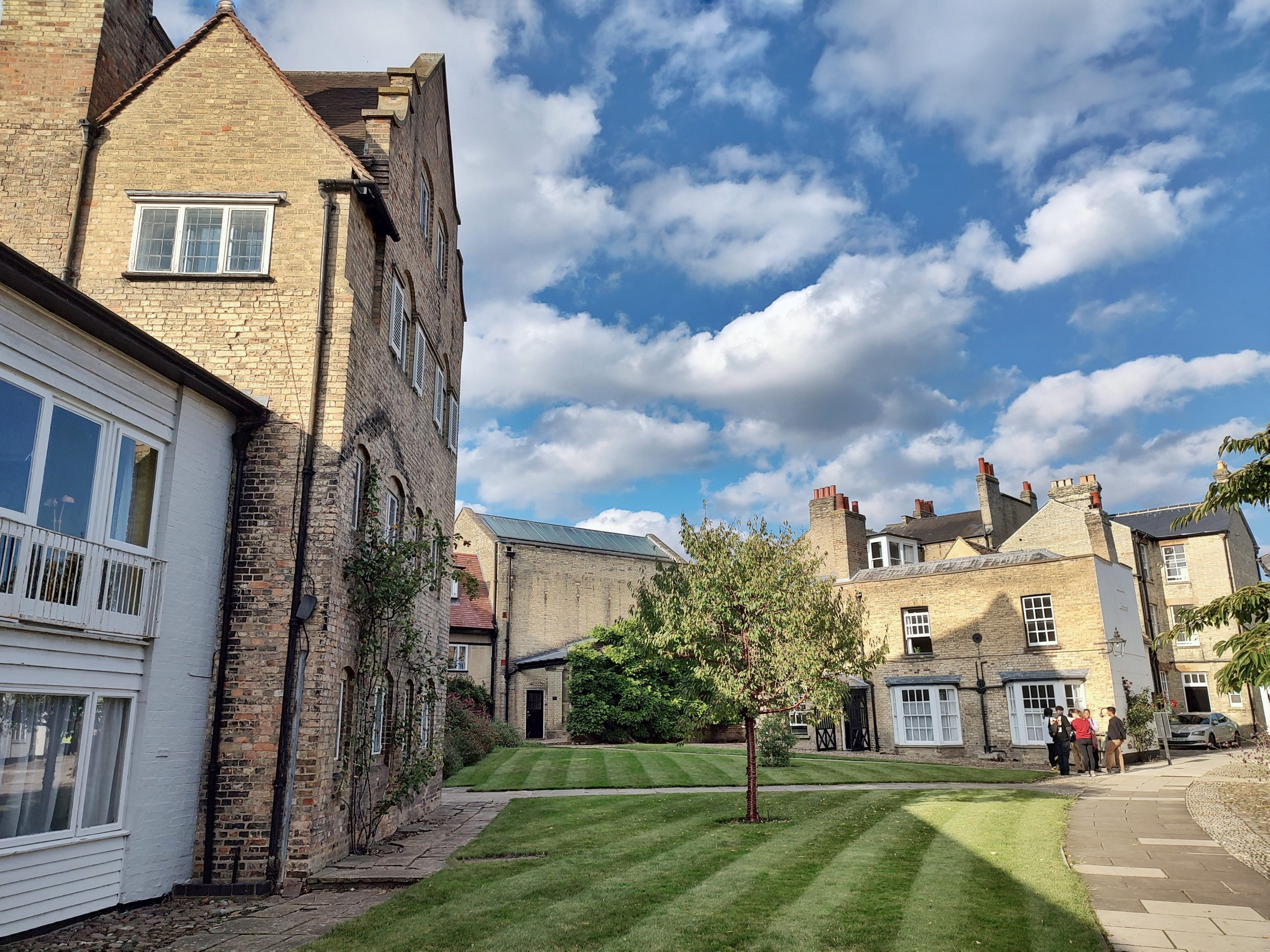
Mallory Court

The area of the college across Magdalene Street from porter's lodge, bounded by Magdalene Street, Northampton Street, the River Cam and St John's College is known as the Magdalene Village. It includes Benson Court, Mallory Court and Buckingham Court, and consists almost exclusively of student accommodation. The area of the Village was developed over a period of 45 years by three architects, Harry Redfern, Sir Edwin Lutyens and David Roberts. The first building to be developed was Mallory Court B (1925–26) and the last was the new Buckingham Court building (1968–70). Lutyens had an original plan which involved demolishing many existing buildings in the area and constructing new buildings that matched the general look and feel of the college's main site, but this plan was scrapped due to insufficient funding and the only part of Lutyens' plan that was realised was the Lutyens building.

Passing through an obscure wooden gate opposite the porter's lodge, the open courtyard of Benson Court can be seen. Benson Court was named after A. C. Benson, master of Magdalene College from 1915 to 1925. Benson is best known for writing the lyrics of Land of Hope and Glory, a British patriotic song set to the tune of Edward Elgar's Pomp and Circumstance March No. 1. The cottages to either side of the entrance pathway are all pre-existing buildings that were converted into student accommodation in the 1960s. In particular, Benson Court H is one of the few buildings in college whose structure survived from the 16th century, and presents its 17th-century facade which was previously known as Cross Keys Inn to the street front of Magdalene Street. To the left of the courtyard is a gentle grassy slope where the college punts are moored and parties are held in the summer.

Across the courtyard is the Lutyens building, also designated Benson A-E, which was built and named after Sir Edwin Lutyens, the architect who planned much of the Village. Due to a lack of funding, it was the only part of Lutyens' original grandiose plan that was built. Part of the building's cost was sponsored by subscriptions raised by Harvard in memory of Henry Dunster, who studied in Magdalene in 1627–1630 and became a founding father of Harvard University. Hence, the crest of Harvard with the inscription Veritas can be found at the entrance to the D staircase. Each staircase in the building had slightly different banister designs, which Lutyens explained was "to help Magdalene men to feel in the dark whether they were entering the correct staircase". The Lutyens building currently hosts about 60 students and fellows as well as the college launderette.

Another two courts can be found to the northwest of Benson Court: Mallory Court and Buckingham Court. Mallory Court was named after George Mallory, the British mountaineer who famously answered "Because it's there" when asked why he wanted to climb Mount Everest. The court itself comprises student rooms, some new and some converted from existing buildings which include a defunct brewery. Buckingham Court has two groups of buildings, which includes the "Tan Yard Cottages" incorporated to the college and refurbished in 1966, and a new building which contains the college's car park. The new Buckingham building, completed in 1970, marked the completion of the Magdalene Village.

=== Quayside ===
Most of the buildings bounded by the River Cam, Bridge Street and Thompson's Lane are owned by Magdalene College, despite being covered by shop-fronts and restaurants on the ground level. Many of these buildings are part of the Quayside development project, built between 1983 and 1989, as part of a business plan of the college. As for student accommodation, this part of the college includes the Bridge Street and Thompson's Lane hostels.

=== Cripps Court ===
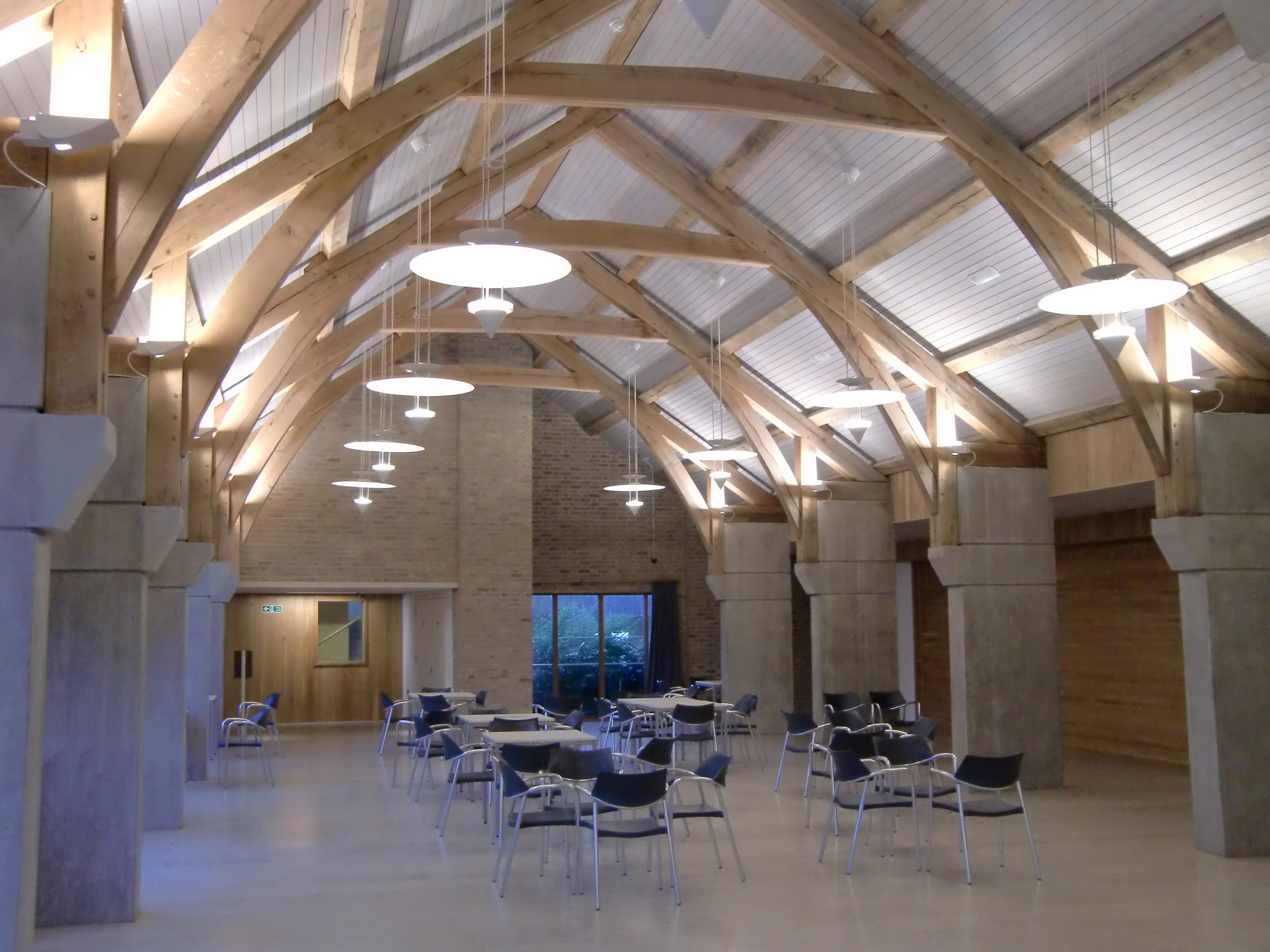
Cripps Court Orangery

Cripps Court is situated on the opposite side of Chesterton Road from the main site of the college. It was built between 2003 and 2005 in response to increasing demands for extra accommodation and conference facilities. The site of Cripps Court is a natural southerly slope, which can be seen from the stepped courtyard in between the buildings. The court was sponsored by, and named after, the Cripps family headed by Humphrey Cripps. It contains a 142-seat auditorium, 5 seminar rooms, an oak-roofed event gallery also called the orangery, and about 60 student rooms.

=== New Library ===
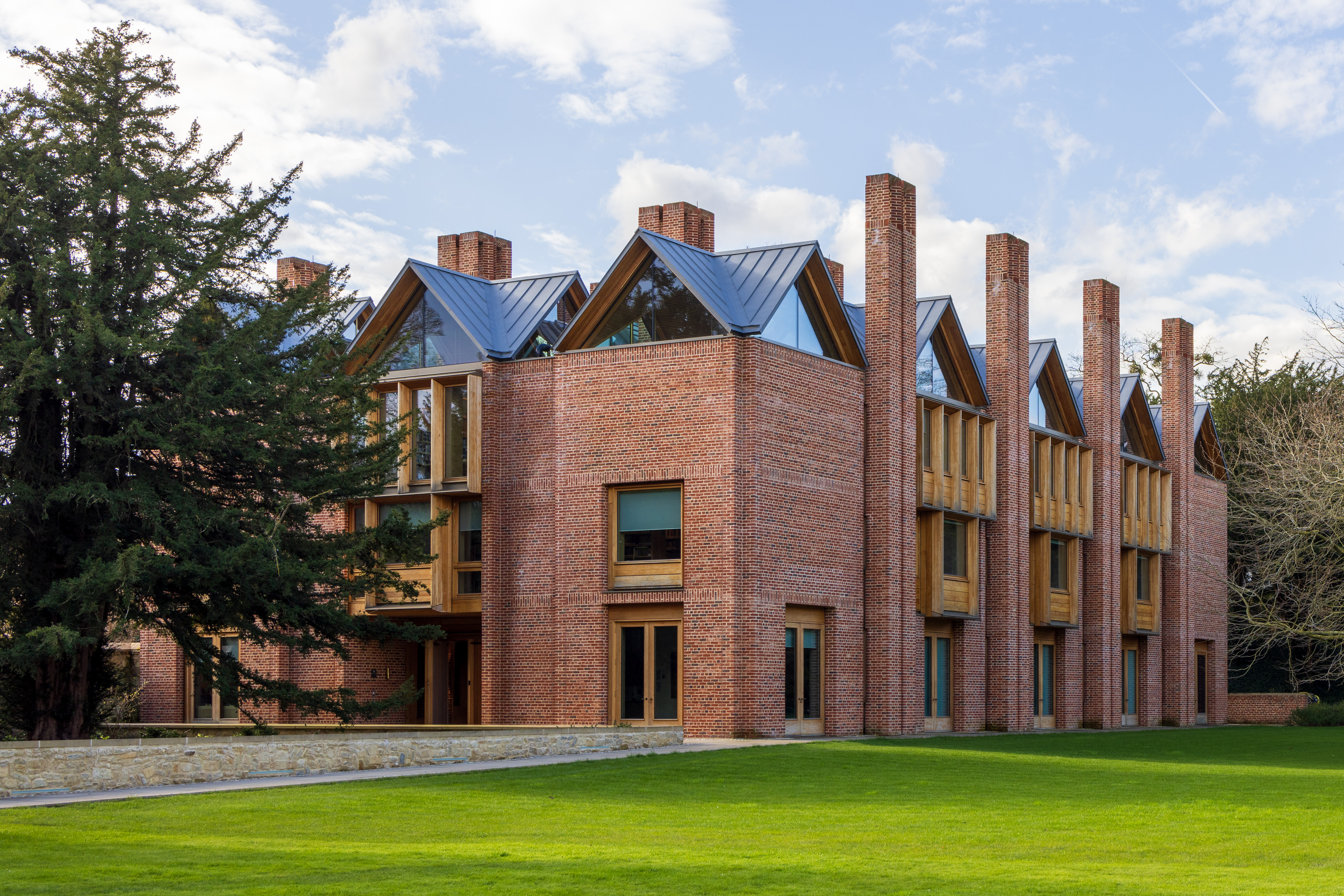
The New Library

Officially opened on 2 July 2022, the New Library is the first library building constructed by Magdalene for 330 years and is situated in the western corner of the Fellows' Garden. Designed by Níall McLaughlin Architects, it won the RIBA Stirling Prize in 2022 for its architectural achievements, the first Oxbridge building to receive this accolade. It holds the College's books for undergraduate and postgraduate use, and it provides more than 90 study spaces across three floors with views of the Fellows' Garden and the River Cam. There is also a group study room, social space, and an archive. The Robert Cripps Gallery provides gallery space for visiting exhibitions and for displaying parts of the College art collection to the wider community.

== Events and traditions ==
Magdalene is noted for its 'traditional' style: it boasts a well-regarded candlelit formal hall (held every evening) and was the last all-male college in Oxford or Cambridge to admit women in 1988 (Oriel College was the last in Oxford, admitting women in 1986).

=== Spelling and pronunciation of name ===
The college is formally "The College of Saint Mary Magdalene", with "Magdalene" customarily pronounced "Maudlyn" (/ˈmɔːdlɪn/ MAWD-lin). The name was chosen when Thomas Audley re-founded and dedicated the college to Mary Magdalene in 1542. In early documents, the name of the college was spelt "Maudleyn" as it was pronounced. Although the standard pronunciation of the name "Magdalene" in the English language has changed, the customary pronunciation of the college's name was retained.

With the development of the General Post Office during the 19th century, the spelling of the college's name was fixed as "Magdalene" with a final "e", to avoid confusion with Magdalen College, Oxford. The two colleges are pronounced the same.

=== College grace ===
	Latin	English
Ante Prandium (before dinner)	Benedic Domine nobis et donis tuis quae de tua largitate sumus sumpturi, et concede ut illis salubriter nutriti tibi debitum obsequium praestare valeamus, per Jesum Christum Dominum et Servatorem Nostrum, Amen. (response – Amen)	'Bless us Lord and your gifts, which from your bounty we are about to receive, and grant that we, healthfully sustained by them, may render to you our dutiful service, through Jesus Christ, our Lord and Saviour (response – Amen)'
Post Prandium (after dinner)	Laus Deo (response – Deo Gratias)	Praise to God (response – Thanks be to God)

=== May Ball ===
The college's May Ball had been a biennial fixture since 1911.

== People associated with Magdalene ==
=== Masters ===
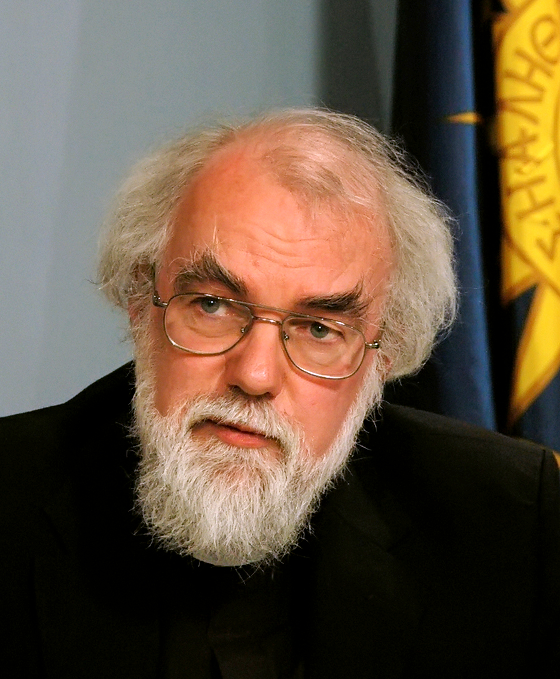
Rowan Williams, former Master of the college

Master of Magdalene College is the title given to the Head of House. Rowan Williams, former Archbishop of Canterbury (2002–12), became the master on 1 January 2013. Sir Christopher Greenwood succeeded Williams as master of Magdalene on 1 October 2020.

Power to appoint the master was vested until 2012 in the visitor of the college, an hereditary title of the heir of the founder, Lord Audley (now Baron Braybrooke). Following an amendment to the college statutes, which was approved by the Queen in Council in February 2012, the master is now appointed by the governing body of the college. The master usually serves until reaching the statutory fellowship retirement age of 67. Exceptionally, this period may be extended until the master in question reaches 70 as occurred in the case of Duncan Robinson, master from 2002 to 2012.

With the position of master comes college-based residency in the form of the Master's Lodge, which may be populated and decorated according to the wishes of the master. Traditionally, every Sunday, the master attends the service in the college chapel before sitting at the head of the high table in hall for formal hall.

=== Notable current and past fellows ===
- Nicholas Boyle, Schroeder Professor of German and biographer of Goethe
- Howard Chase, Professor of Biochemical Engineering
- Tim Clutton-Brock, zoologist known for his work on red deer and meerkats
- Helen Cooper, Professor of Medieval and Renaissance English, a Chair formerly held by three previous Magdalene fellows: C. S. Lewis, J. A. W. Bennett, and John Stevens
- Hannah Critchlow, Outreach Fellow, author, broadcaster and neuroscientist
- Saul Dubow, Smuts Professor of Commonwealth History
- Eamon Duffy, Professor of the History of Christianity and Roman Catholic commentator
- Richard Ellis, Professor of Astrophysics, University College London and former Director of Palomar Observatory, California
- Wolfgang Ernst, visiting fellow, Regius Professor of Civil Law at the University of Oxford
- Peter J. Grubb, ecologist and botanist
- Christopher Greenwood, former British judge at the International Court of Justice.
- John Gurdon, former Master, honorary fellow, developmental biologist, begetter of the Gurdon Institute, Nobel prizewinner in 2012
- C. S. Lewis, literary critic, author and theologian
- Alfred Newton, ornithologist, first Professor of Zoology
- Derek Oulton, formerly Permanent Secretary, Lord Chancellor's Department
- James Raven, cultural historian and historian of the book
- I. A. Richards, English literary critic and rhetorician, considered one of the founders of the contemporary study of literature in English
- David Roberts (1911–82), architect and Director of Studies in Architecture, designer of more student housing in England than any other architect of his generation.
- Emma Rothschild, Jeremy and Jane Knowles Professor of History at Harvard University, director of the Centre for History and Economics
- John Edwin Field, experimental physicist whose research focused on the physics and chemistry of solids.

=== Notable alumni ===
The college's most famous alumnus is the 17th-century chronicler Samuel Pepys whose papers and books were donated to the college upon his death and are housed in the Pepys Library. A portrait of the diarist by Peter Lely hangs in the Hall.

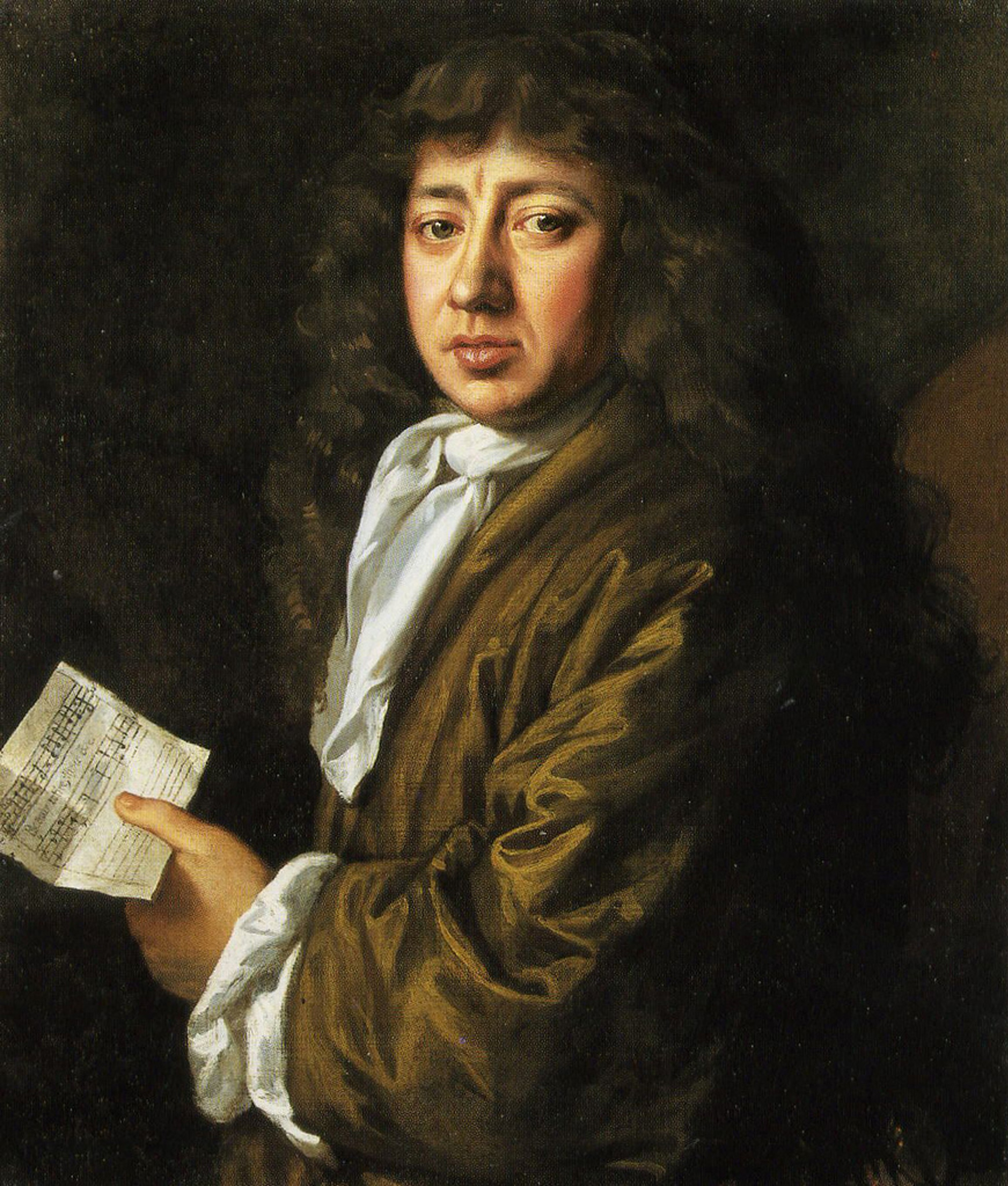
Samuel Pepys, naval administrator, politician and diarist

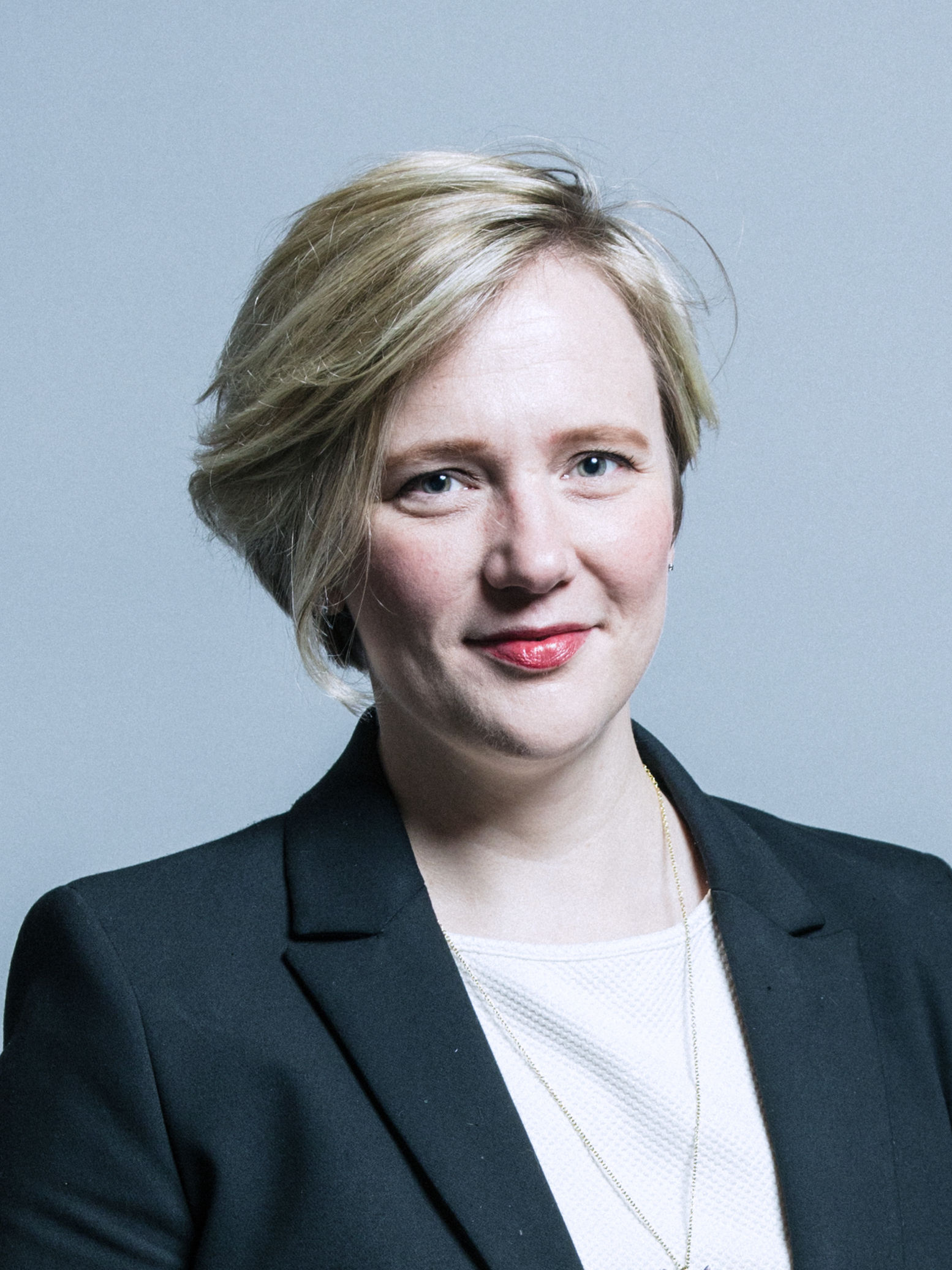
Stella Creasy, politician

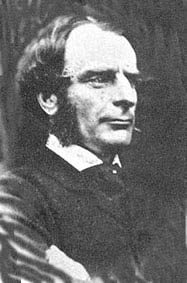
Charles Kingsley, author and academic

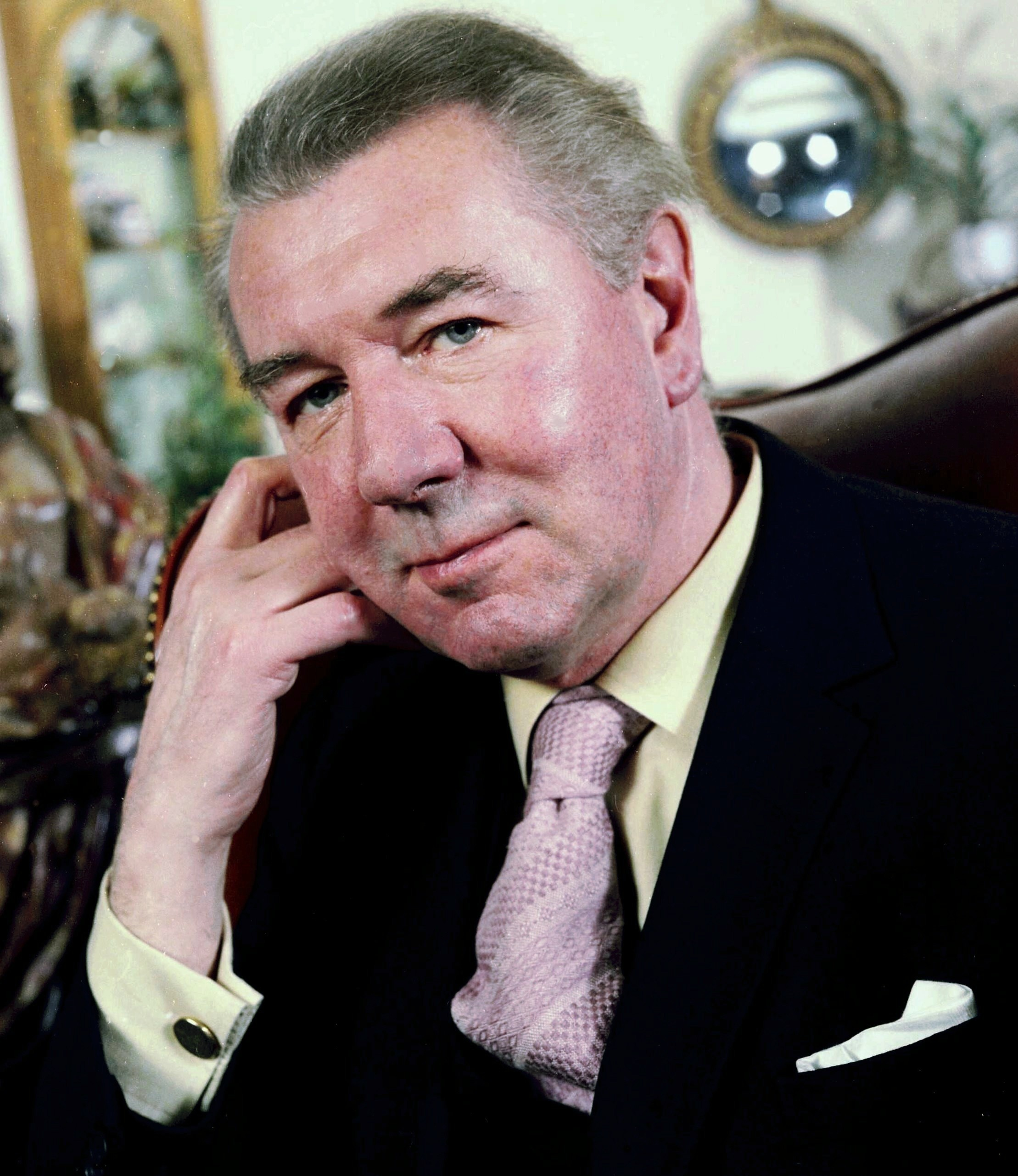
Sir Michael Redgrave, actor

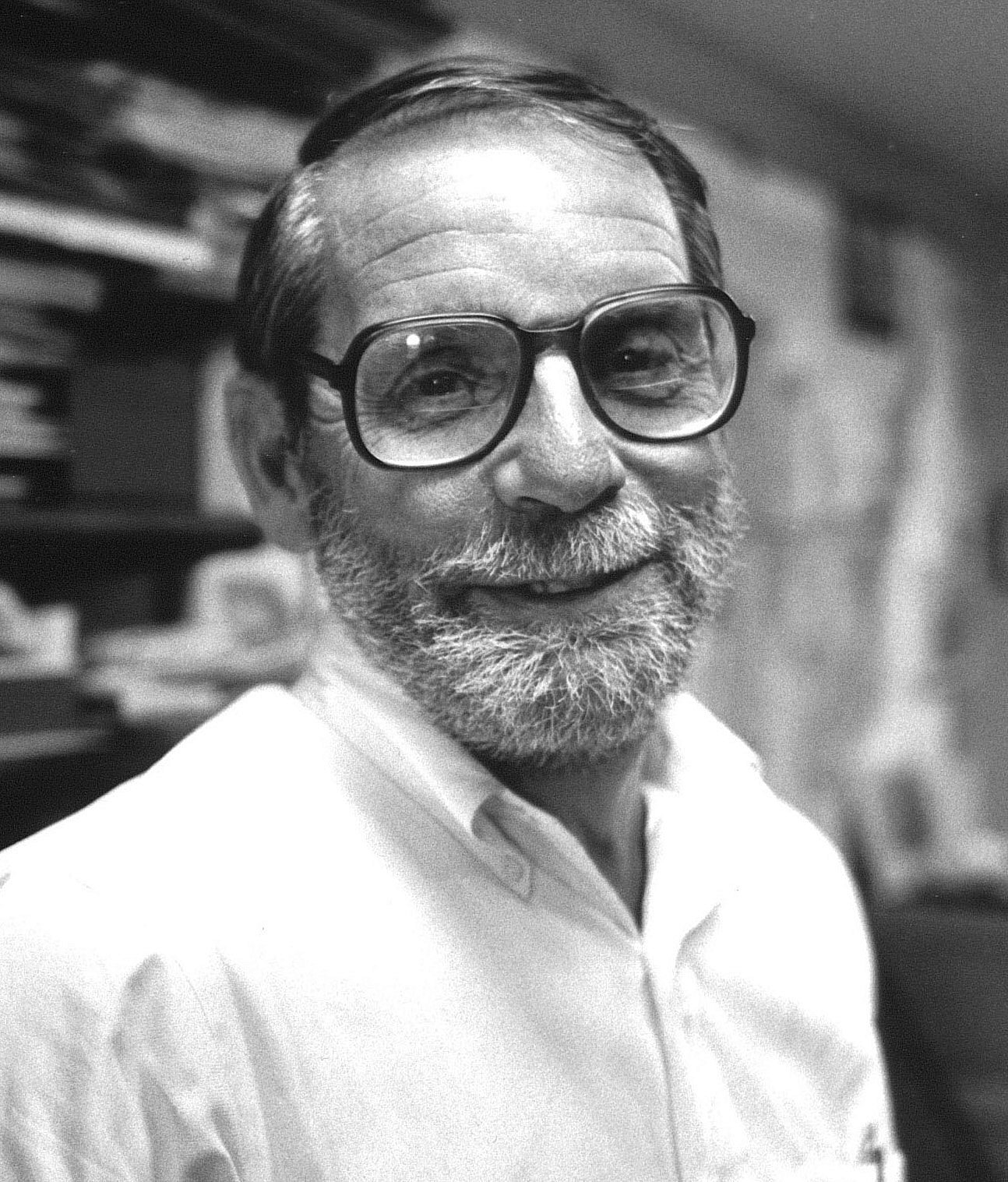
John McPhee, award-winning writer

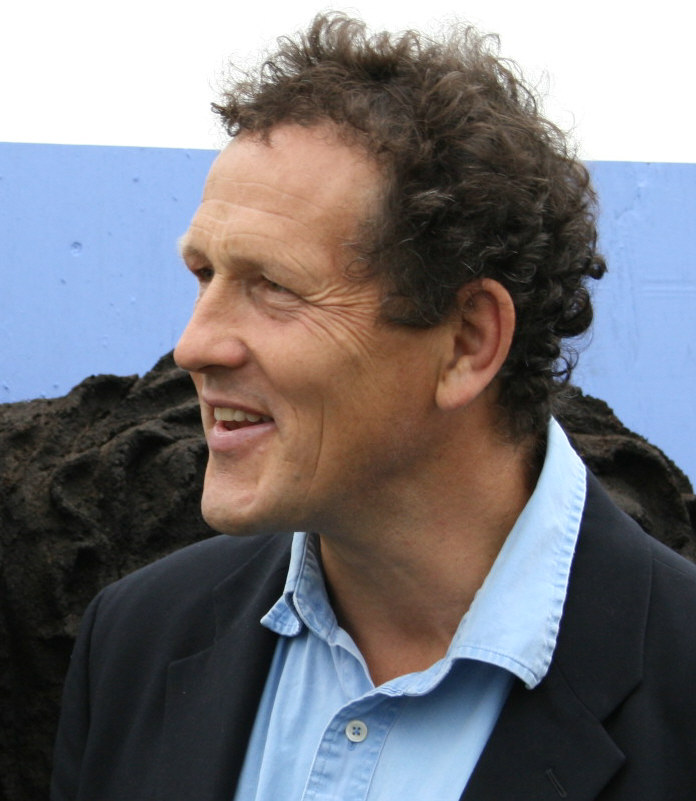
Monty Don, television presenter and writer

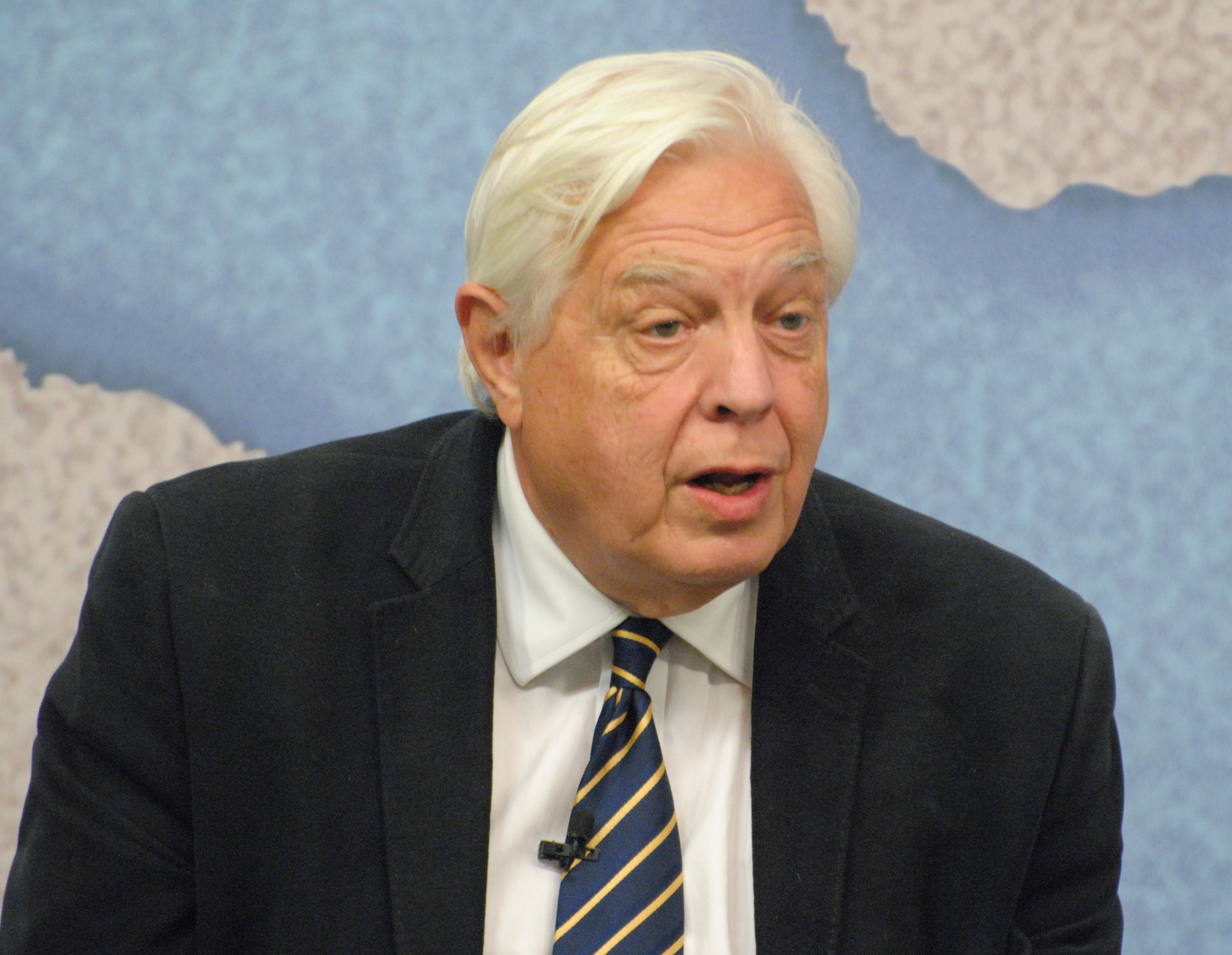
John Simpson, journalist

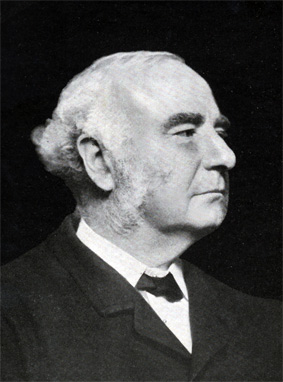
Alfred Newton, zoologist and ornithologist

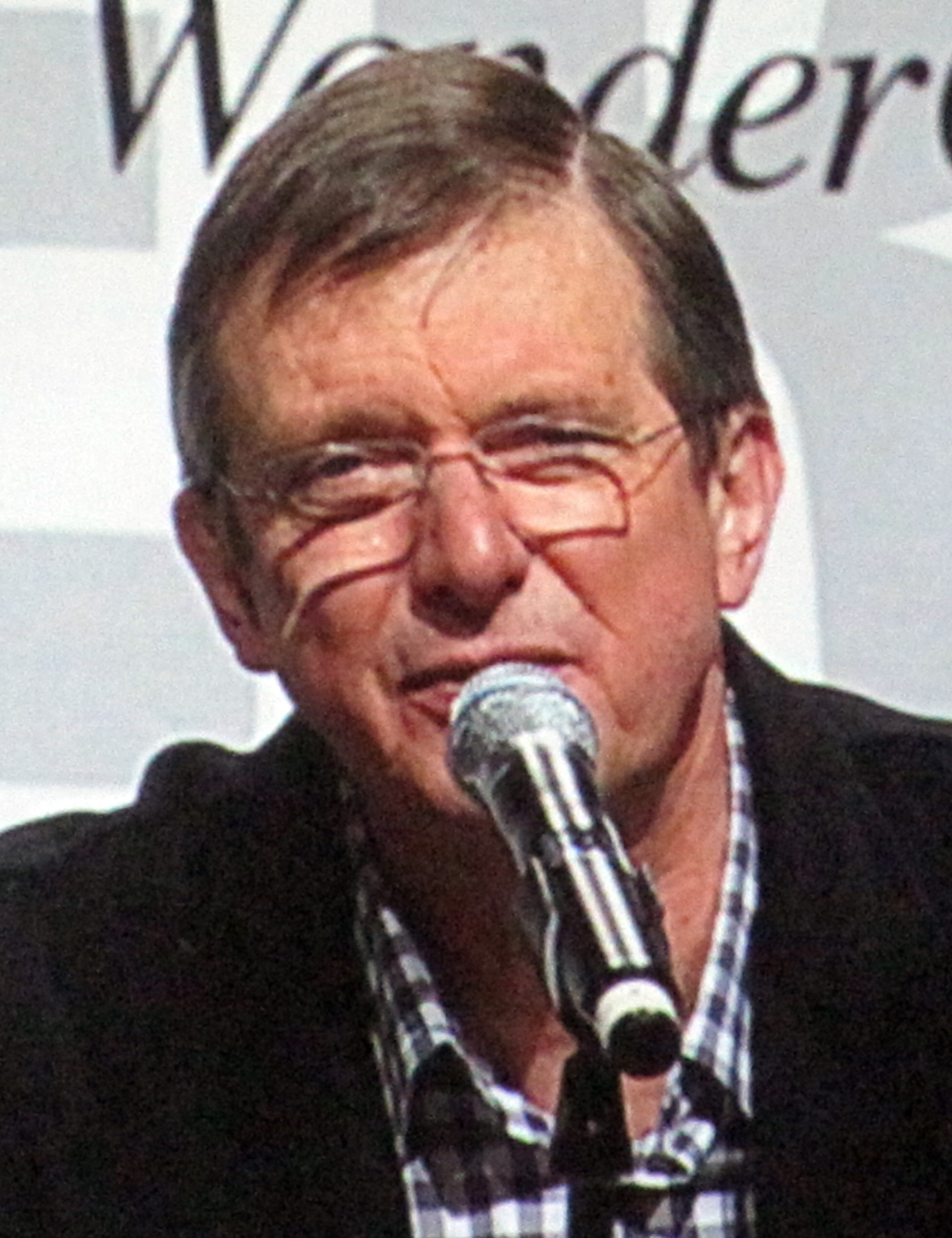
Mike Newell, film director

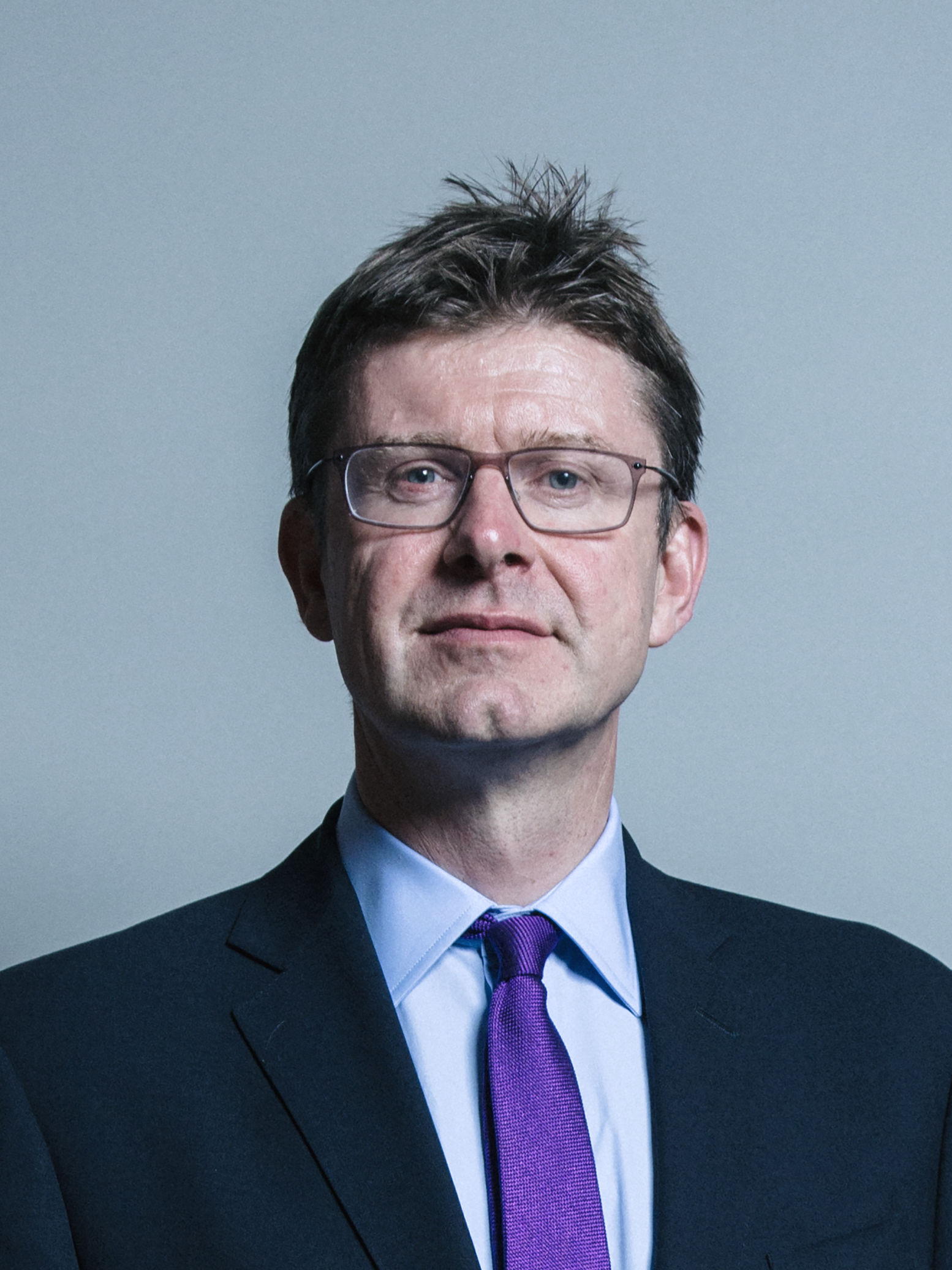
Greg Clark, politician

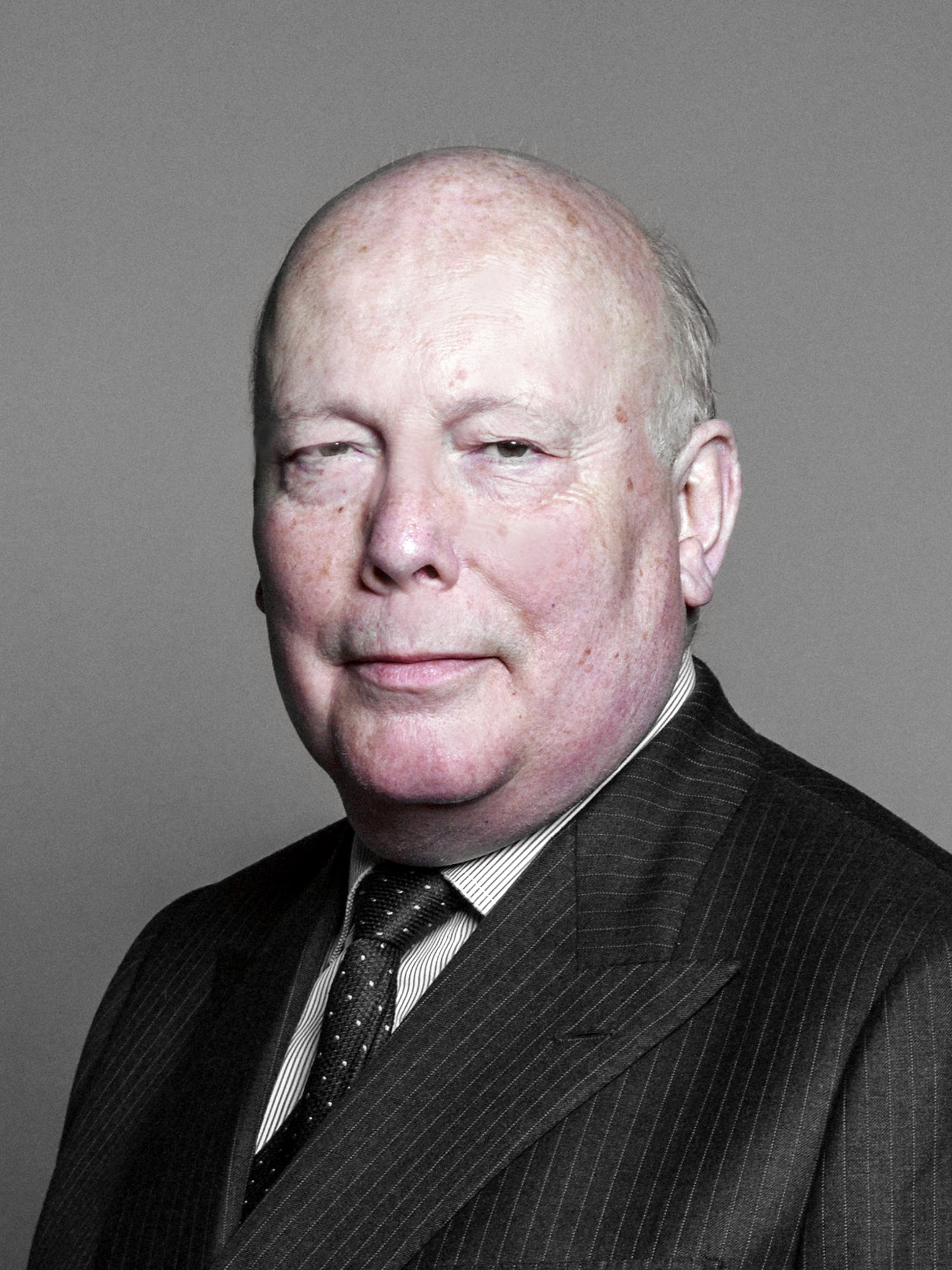
Julian Fellowes, screenwriter

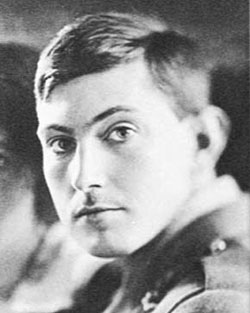
George Mallory, English mountaineer
