= Percy Edward Kent =

British geologist (1913–1986)

Sir Percy Kent
- Born: Peter Edward Kent; 18 March 1913; Basford, Nottinghamshire, England
- Died: 9 July 1986 (aged 73); Chesterfield, Derbyshire, England
- Citizenship: British
- Education: West Bridgford Grammar School
- Alma mater: University of Nottingham
- Spouses: Margaret Betty Hood (1940-1974); Lorna Scott (1976-1986)
- Children: Helen Cooper; Judith Booth
- Awards: Bigsby Medal (1955); Murchison Medal (1969); Royal Medal (1971)
- Scientific career
- Fields: Geology
- Institutions: Chief Geologist of BP (1966-1971); President of the Geological Society of London (1974-1976)

Sir Percy Edward Kent FGS FRS (18 March 1913 – 9 July 1986) was a British geologist who won the Royal Medal in 1971. Awarded the Bigsby Medal in 1955 and the Murchison Medal in 1969, he was made a Knight Bachelor in the 1973 Birthday Honours.

== Early life ==
He attended West Bridgford Grammar School. From the University of Nottingham he gained a BSc in 1934, and a PhD in 1941.

== Career ==
P.E. Kent joined Louis Leakey and Mary Leakey in their 1935 investigation of Olduvai Gorge. He was Chief Geologist from 1966 to 1971 of BP. In 1969-1970 he served as the President of the Lincolnshire Naturalists' Union, where he already served as the sectional officer for geology. From 1974 to 1976 he was President of the Geological Society of London.

== Personal life ==
He married Margaret (Betty) Hood in 1940, and they had two daughters, one of whom is Helen Cooper. His first wife died in 1974. In 1976 he married Lorna Scott. He lived in West Bridgford.
