= Nicolette Zeeman =

British literary scholar

Nicolette "Nicky" Zeeman (born 3 December 1956) is a British literary scholar. She has been Professor of Medieval and Renaissance English at the University of Cambridge since January 2016 and a Fellow of King's College, Cambridge since 1995.

== Early life and education ==
Zeeman was born on 3 December 1956 in Cambridge, Cambridgeshire, England. She is the daughter of Sir Christopher Zeeman, a mathematician, and Elizabeth Salter, who was an academic specialising in medieval literature. She was educated at Mill Mount Grammar School, an all-girls grammar school in York. She studied at Clare College, Cambridge, graduating with a Bachelor of Arts (BA) degree in 1979. In 2000, she was awarded a Doctor of Philosophy (PhD) degree by the University of Cambridge.

== Academic career ==
Zeeman was a junior research fellow at Newnham College, Cambridge from 1984 to 1987. She was elected a fellow of King's College, Cambridge in 1995. Within the Faculty of English, University of Cambridge, she was a lecturer (2012–2014), then senior lecturer (2014–2015), before being made Professor of Medieval and Renaissance English in January 2016. She was a fellow at the Radcliffe Institute for Advanced Studies at Harvard University for the 2014–15 academic year.

Zeeman's research is focused on the literature of the later Middle Ages. She studies literature and devotional writings in English, French and Latin, including those of Chaucer and the Piers Plowman.

== Selected works ==
- Salter, Elizabeth (1988). Pearsall, Derek; Zeeman, Nicolette (eds.). English and international: studies in the literature, art, and patronage of medieval England. Cambridge: Cambridge University Press. ISBN 978-0521343756.
- Dimmick, Jeremy; Simpson, James; Zeeman, Nicolette, eds. (2002). Images, idolatry, and iconoclasm in late medieval England: textuality and the visual image. Oxford: Oxford University Press. ISBN 978-0198187592.
- Zeeman, Nicolette (2006). Piers Plowman and the medieval discourse of desire. Cambridge: Cambridge University Press. ISBN 978-0521856102.
- Ghosh, Kantik; Zeeman, Nicolette; Denery II, Dallas G., eds. (2014). Uncertain knowledge: scepticism, relativism, and doubt in the middle ages. Turnhout: Brepols Publishers. ISBN 978-2503547763.
- Massing, Jean Michel; Zeeman, Nicolette, eds. (2014). King's College Chapel 1515-2015: Art, Music and Religion in Cambridge. Turnhout: Harvey Miller Publishers. ISBN 978-1-909400214.
- Zeeman, Nicolette (2020). The Arts of Disruption: Allegory and Piers Plowman. Oxford: Oxford University Press. ISBN 978-0198860242.

Academic offices	Professor of Medieval and Renaissance English; University of Cambridge; 2016 to 2024
