= John Kerrigan (literary scholar) =

British literary scholar

John Kerrigan, FBA (born 1956) is a British literary scholar, with interests including the works of Shakespeare, Wordsworth and modern poetry since Emily Dickinson and Hopkins, along with Irish studies.

Kerrigan was born in Liverpool; he was educated there at St. Edward's College followed by Oxford, where he went to Keble, later becoming a Junior Research Fellow at Merton.

Since 1982 he has taught at Cambridge where he is a fellow of St. John's College. Between 2001 and 2023 he was Professor of English 2000 in the Faculty of English, University of Cambridge.

He has lectured extensively in Europe, North and South America, Australia, New Zealand and Japan, and his publications are internationally acclaimed. In 2013 he was elected a Fellow of the British Academy. Visiting positions include UCLA, Auckland and Princeton.

During the 1980s Kerrigan established himself as one of a group of scholars who revolutionised the editing of Shakespeare by discrediting the practice of 'conflating' variant early texts of such plays as Hamlet and King Lear, though his position, like that of others, has become more complicated over time. His own editions include Love's Labour's Lost (1982) and Shakespeare's Sonnets and A Lover's Complaint (1986). He did further work on A Lover's Complaint recovering its sources and analogues in Motives of Woe (1991). His recent Shakespearean output includes essays on 'The Phoenix and Turtle' (2013), an extensive analysis of the question 'How Celtic was Shakespeare?', and Shakespeare's Binding Language (2016). His 2016 Oxford Wells Shakespeare Lectures were published in 2018 as Shakespeare's Originality.

He won the Truman Capote Award for Literary Criticism in 1998 for Revenge Tragedy: Aeschylus to Armageddon, an ambitious study in comparative literature, and in 2001 published a book of essays On Shakespeare and Early Modern Literature.

His Archipelagic English: Literature, History, and Politics 1603-1707 (2008) seeks to correct the traditional Anglocentric account of seventeenth-century English Literature by showing how much remarkable writing was produced in Wales, Scotland, and Ireland, and how preoccupied such English authors as Shakespeare, Milton, and Marvell were with the often fraught interactions between ethnic, religious, and national groups around Britain and Ireland.

Over the last couple of decades John Kerrigan has published numerous essays on modern poetry, including Louis MacNeice, Seamus Heaney, Roy Fisher, Geoffrey Hill, Denise Riley, Eiléan Ní Chuilleanáin and Paul Muldoon. Among the topics he has recently addressed are poetry and the migrant crisis and environmentalism.

He has written extensively for the Times Literary Supplement (London) and the London Review of Books.

== Works ==
- Ed., William Shakespeare, Love's Labour's Lost (1982)
- Ed., William Shakespeare, The Sonnets and A Lover's Complaint (1986)
- Motives of Woe: Shakespeare and Female Complaint (1991)
- Ed., with Michael Cordner and Peter Holland, English Comedy (1994)
- Revenge Tragedy: Aeschylus to Armageddon (1996)
- Ed., with Peter Robinson, The Thing about Roy Fisher (2000)
- On Shakespeare and Early Modern Literature: Essays (2001)
- Archipelagic English: Literature, History, and Politics, 1603-1707 (2008)
- Shakespeare's Binding Language (2016)
- Shakespeare's Originality (2018)
