= Jill Mann =

Scholar of medieval literature (b. 1943)

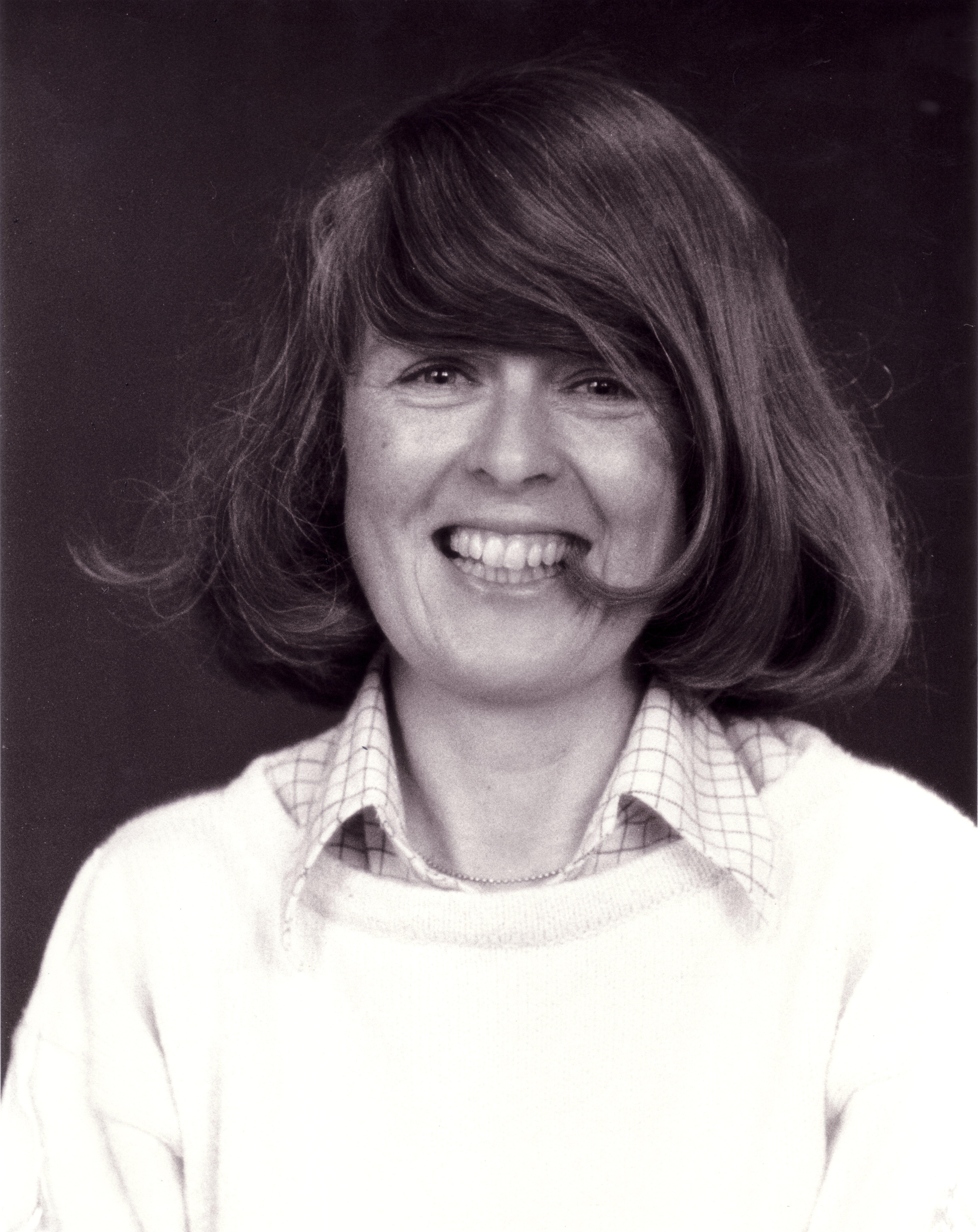

Gillian Lesley "Jill" Mann, FBA (born 7 April 1943), is a scholar known for her work on medieval literature, especially on Middle English and Medieval Latin.

== Education and career ==
Mann was born in York, where her father was engaged in war work, but brought up in Sunderland, Co. Durham, where she was educated at the Bede Grammar School for Girls. In 1961 she won a place at St Anne's College, Oxford, and took her BA (1st Class Hons) in English Language and Literature in 1964. She began research work on the General Prologue to the Canterbury Tales in Oxford, but in 1967 she moved to Cambridge and eventually transferred to a Cambridge PhD, which she completed in 1971. She held a Research Fellowship at Clare Hall, Cambridge, from 1968 to 1971; from 1971 to 1972 she taught medieval and some modern literature at the University of Kent at Canterbury. In 1972 she returned to Cambridge as an Official Fellow of Girton College, and in 1974 she was appointed to an Assistant Lectureship in the Faculty of English, upgraded to Lecturer in 1978. In 1988 she was elected Professor of Medieval and Renaissance English (Cambridge), a post which she held until 1998. She was Chair of the Faculty of English from 1993 to 1995, and helped the Faculty prepare for its first ever HEFCE teaching quality assessment. In 1998 she resigned the Cambridge Chair and took up a post as Notre Dame Professor of English at the University of Notre Dame, Indiana; on taking early retirement in 2004, she was made an Emeritus Professor of Notre Dame. She is resident in Cambridge, and is a Life Fellow of Girton College.

== Publications ==
Mann's work has always had a strongly comparative character, bringing together texts in several medieval languages. Her dominant interests are the literature of fourteenth-century England, especially Chaucer, and medieval beast literature in Latin, French, and English. Her books include Chaucer and Medieval Estates Satire (1973), Feminizing Chaucer (2002), and The Cambridge Companion to Chaucer (edited with Piero Boitani); she also edited the Canterbury Tales for Penguin Classics (2005). She produced an edition and translation of the Latin beast epic Ysengrimus, with a lengthy account of the poem's relation to its historical context in twelfth-century Flanders; she is currently working on an edition and translation of the Speculum Stultorum, another twelfth-century Latin beast epic, written by a monk of Christ Church, Canterbury. She has published some 60 articles on medieval literature in English, Latin, French, and Italian; fifteen of them are collected in Life in Words: Essays on Chaucer, the Gawain-Poet, and Malory, edited with a lengthy Introduction by Mark David Rasmussen analysing their contribution to medieval literary studies. Excerpts from her published work are frequently included in Norton Critical Editions and similar anthologies.

== Bibliography ==
- Chaucer and Medieval Estates Satire: The Literature of Social Classes and the General Prologue to the Canterbury Tales (Cambridge, 1973)
- The Cambridge Chaucer Companion (Cambridge, 1986); revised as The Cambridge Companion to Chaucer, ed. Piero Boitani and Jill Mann, 2nd edn (Cambridge, 2003)
- Ysengrimus: Text with Introduction, Translation and Commentary (Leiden, 1987)
- Geoffrey Chaucer (Harvester-Wheatsheaf Feminist Readings series), (Hemel Hempstead, 1991); revised as Feminizing Chaucer (Cambridge, 2002)
- The Canterbury Tales, ed., Penguin Classics (London, 2005)
- The Text in the Community: Essays on Medieval Works, Manuscripts, Authors and Readers, ed. with Maura Nolan (Notre Dame, IN, 2006)
- From Aesop to Reynard: Beast Literature in Medieval Britain (Oxford, 2009)
- Ysengrimus, ed. and trans., Dumbarton Oaks Medieval Library 26 (Cambridge, Mass., 2013)
- Life in Words: Essays on Chaucer, the Gawain-Poet, and Malory, with an Introduction by Mark David Rasmussen (Toronto, 2014)
- Nigel of Longchamp, Speculum Stultorum, ed. and trans. Jill Mann (Oxford, 2023)

A full bibliography up to 2011 is published in Mann's festschrift, Medieval Latin and Middle English Literature, ed. Christopher Cannon and Maura Nolan (Cambridge, 2011)
