= Faculty of English, University of Cambridge =

Research centre in the UK

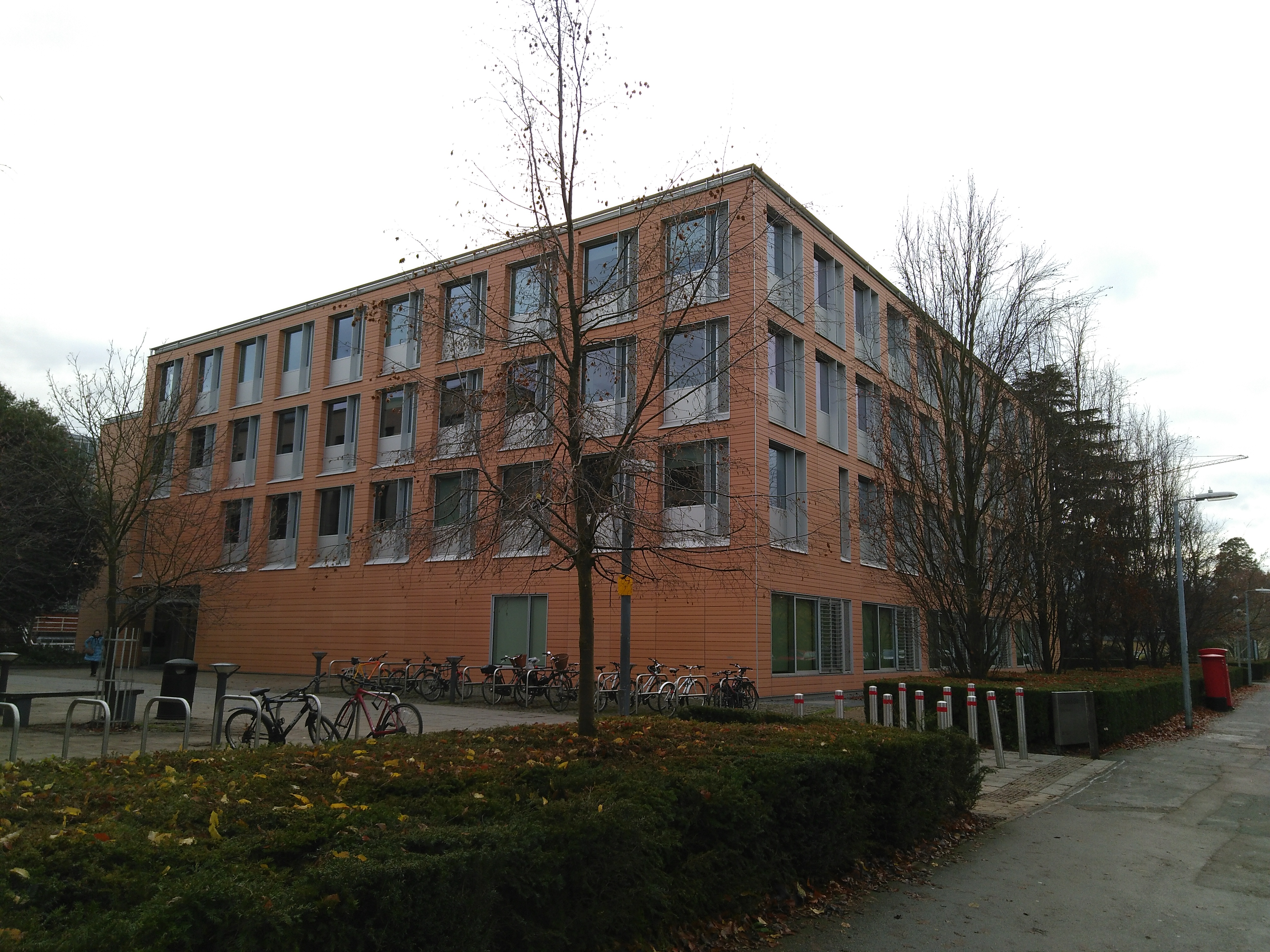
Faculty of English building, 9 West Road, Cambridge

The Faculty of English is a constituent part of the University of Cambridge. It was founded in 1914 as a Tripos within the Faculty of Medieval and Modern Languages. It could be studied only as a 'Part I' of a degree course, alongside a 'Part II' either in medieval languages or from another Tripos. In 1926, the course became a distinct Faculty.

The undergraduate degree course of 'Cambridge English', as well as the Faculty as a whole, is known for its distinctive focus on close reading (called Practical criticism), first championed by I. A. Richards and then later by William Empson and F. R. Leavis. Since the course was founded in 1926, Practical Criticism, Tragedy and Shakespeare have been mandatory parts of the course; the English Moralists paper (now renamed the Ethical Imagination) has also remained as an optional paper.

In the present day, its research focus is wide ranging: from Old English literature through to contemporary, and also associated themes such as digital humanities and the history of the book. One of its sub-divisions is the Department of Anglo-Saxon, Norse and Celtic.

== Notable staff ==
The faculty's senior teaching posts include a number of named professorships:

- Elrington and Bosworth Professor of Anglo-Saxon (currently Rosalind Love)
- King Edward VII Professor of English Literature (currently Clair Wills)
- Professor of Medieval and Renaissance English (Cambridge) (1954) (currently Anthony Bale)
- English (2001) Professor (currently Jennifer Richards)
- Grace 2 Professor (currently Claire Pettitt)

Other notable current academics:

- Priyamvada Gopal, Professor of Postcolonial Studies
- John Kerrigan, Professor of English
- Robert Macfarlane, Reader in Literature and the Geohumanities

== People associated with the Faculty and notable alumni ==
=== Academics and public intellectuals ===
- Marshall McLuhan
- Arthur Quiller-Couch, the first holder of the King Edward VII Professorship
- F. R. Leavis
- C. S. Lewis
- M. C. Bradbrook
- Raymond Williams
- E. M. W. Tillyard
- Terry Eagleton
- Germaine Greer
- Eric Griffiths (critic)

=== Writers ===
- J. B. Priestley
- J. H. Prynne
- Veronica Forrest-Thomson
- Sylvia Plath
- Ted Hughes
- Zadie Smith
- Peter Ackroyd
- Douglas Adams
- Howard Brenton
- Martin Crimp
- Emma Donoghue
- Margaret Drabble
- Sebastian Faulks
- Julian Fellowes
- Jez Butterworth

=== Actors ===
- Ian McKellen
- Miriam Margolyes
- Emma Thompson
- Sophie Winkleman

=== Sport ===
- Amy Hunt

=== Politicians ===
- Richard Burgon
- Andy Burnham
