= Jack A. W. Bennett =

New Zealand literary scholar

Jack Arthur Walter Bennett (28 February 1911 – 29 January 1981) was a New Zealand–born literary scholar.

== Early life and education ==
Jack Arthur Walter Bennett was born at Mount Eden, Auckland, New Zealand, the eldest son of Ernest Bennett, a foreman for a shoe manufacturer, where he was a "shoe clicker and pattern cutter", and Alexandra, née Corrall, both born in Leicester, England. The Bennetts lived in a "suburban bungalow" called "Rocky Nook". Bennett attended Mount Albert Grammar School in Auckland, New Zealand. He notably wrote the Mount Albert Grammar School hymn, which is sung at school assemblies to this day.

Bennett studied at the University of Auckland, where he is described by biographer James McNeish as "poor and deserving" before going on to Merton College, Oxford, where, still indigent, he survived on a diet of Cornish pasties.

== Career ==
In McNeish's book Dance of the Peacocks, he is noted as a member of what was to be described in British academe as the Oxford "New Zealand Mafia", a loose-knit group of extraordinarily gifted young men from New Zealand who studied at Oxford University, many as Rhodes Scholars, before the Second World War. The link between them was to endure for the rest of their lives. The group included John Mulgan, Dan Davin, James Munro Bertram, Desmond Patrick Costello, Charles Brasch, Norman Davis and Ian Milner. McNeish describes Bennett as "at an angle, separated by the exuberance of his scholarship, his saintliness, and his forgetfulness ... he considered himself lucky to have received the Scholarship [to Oxford], since he forgot to include any testimonials with his application".

McNeish also mentions Bennett's work with the British Information Service in America during World War II: asked to help out for a few weeks, he remained for the duration, returning to Oxford in 1943 and at the end of the war.

He became best known as a scholar of Middle English literature. He was editor of the journal Medium Aevum from 1957 to 1981, having earlier assisted his predecessor, Charles Talbut Onions, and was a colleague of C. S. Lewis at Magdalen College, Oxford. In 1964 he succeeded Lewis as Professor of Medieval and Renaissance English at Cambridge University. He was elected a Foreign Honorary Member of the American Academy of Arts and Sciences in 1976. His most substantial work was the volume Middle English Literature for the Oxford History of English Literature series, which was completed after his death by Douglas Gray and published in 1986. Other works include The Parlement of Foules: An Interpretation (1957); Chaucer's Book of Fame: An Exposition of "The House of Fame" (1960); and Chaucer at Oxford and at Cambridge (1974). Bennett also edited several volumes, including The Knight's Tale by Chaucer, Early Middle English Verse and Prose (1966, with G. V. Smithers), and the collection Essays on Malory (1963).

He was one of the Inklings, an informal literary group that included two of the most important writers of the twentieth century, C. S. Lewis and J. R. R. Tolkien, the authors of The Chronicles of Narnia and The Lord of the Rings respectively.

He is buried at the Ascension Parish Burial Ground in Cambridge with his wife, Gwyneth (1916–1980).
