= Professor of Medieval and Renaissance English (Cambridge) =

Professorship in English literature

The chair in Medieval and Renaissance English (1954) is a professorship in English literature at Cambridge University. It was created in 1954 for C. S. Lewis, and is unusual among professorships in this field in uniting 'medieval' and 'renaissance' categories and fields of study.

== Professors of Medieval and Renaissance English ==
- C. S. Lewis, 1954
- J. A. W. Bennett, 1964
- John Stevens, 1978
- Jill Mann, 1988
- James Simpson, 1999
- Helen Cooper, 2005
- Nicolette Zeeman, 2016
- Anthony Bale, 2024
