= Outline of William Shakespeare =

Overview of and topical guide to the life and legacy of William Shakespeare

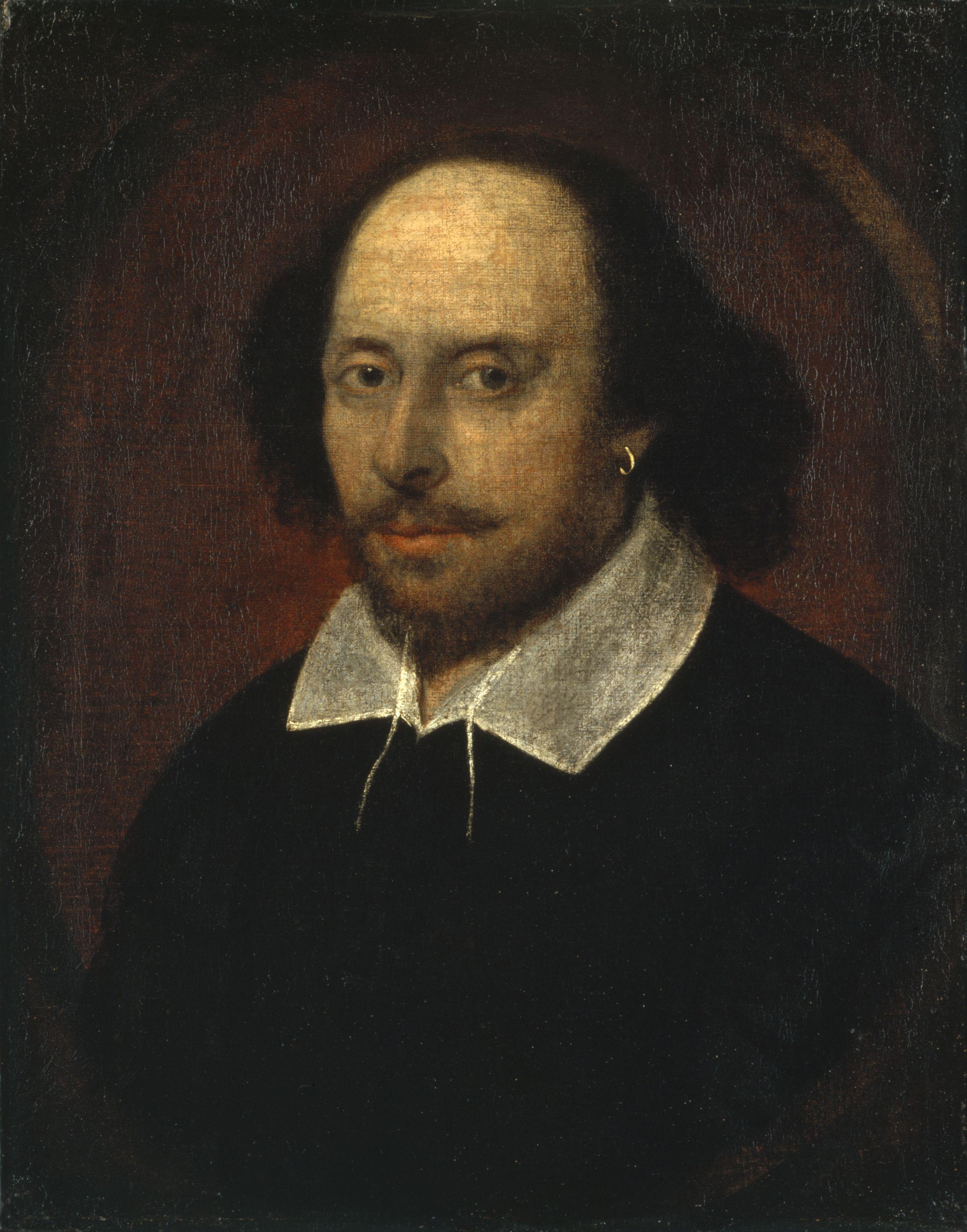
The Chandos portrait, believed to be Shakespeare, held in the National Portrait Gallery, London

The following outline is provided as an overview of and topical guide to the life and legacy of William Shakespeare, an English poet, playwright, and actor who lived during the 17th century. He is widely regarded as the greatest writer in the English language and the world's pre-eminent dramatist. He is often called England's national poet and the "Bard of Avon".

== Works ==
- Shakespeare bibliography
- Chronology of Shakespeare's plays
- William Shakespeare's collaborations
- Complete Works of Shakespeare
- Early texts of Shakespeare's works
- Shakespeare's late romances
- Shakespeare plays in quarto
- Shakespearean problem play
- Translations of works by William Shakespeare
- Shakespearean characters
  - List of Shakespearean characters (A–K)
  - List of Shakespearean characters (L–Z)
  - List of historical figures dramatised by Shakespeare
  - Women in Shakespeare's works

=== Plays ===
==== Tragedies ====
- Antony and Cleopatra
- Coriolanus
- Hamlet
- Julius Caesar
- King Lear
- Macbeth
- Othello
- Romeo and Juliet
- Timon of Athens
- Titus Andronicus
- Troilus and Cressida

==== Comedies ====
- All's Well That Ends Well
- As You Like It
- The Comedy of Errors
- Cymbeline
- Love's Labour's Lost
- Measure for Measure
- The Merchant of Venice
- The Merry Wives of Windsor
- A Midsummer Night's Dream
- Much Ado About Nothing
- Pericles, Prince of Tyre
- The Taming of the Shrew
- The Tempest
- Twelfth Night
- The Two Gentlemen of Verona
- The Two Noble Kinsmen
- The Winter's Tale

==== Histories ====
- The Life and Death of King John
- Edward III (play)
- Richard II (play)
- Henry IV, Part 1
- Henry IV, Part 2
- Henry V (play)
- Henry VI, Part 1
- Henry VI, Part 2
- Henry VI, Part 3
- Richard III (play)
- Henry VIII (play)

=== Poetry ===
- Shakespeare's sonnets – 1 • 2 • 3 • 4 • 5 • 6 • 7 • 8 • 9 • 10 • 11 • 12 • 13 • 14 • 15 • 16 • 17 • 18 • 19 • 20 • 21 • 22 • 23 • 24 • 25 • 26 • 27 • 28 • 29 • 30 • 31 • 32 • 33 • 34 • 35 • 36 • 37 • 38 • 39 • 40 • 41 • 42 • 43 • 44 • 45 • 46 • 47 • 48 • 49 • 50 • 51 • 52 • 53 • 54 • 55 • 56 • 57 • 58 • 59 • 60 • 61 • 62 • 63 • 64 • 65 • 66 • 67 • 68 • 69 • 70 • 71 • 72 • 73 • 74 • 75 • 76 • 77 • 78 • 79 • 80 • 81 • 82 • 83 • 84 • 85 • 86 • 87 • 88 • 89 • 90 • 91 • 92 • 93 • 94 • 95 • 96 • 97 • 98 • 99 • 100 • 101 • 102 • 103 • 104 • 105 • 106 • 107 • 108 • 109 • 110 • 111 • 112 • 113 • 114 • 115 • 116 • 117 • 118 • 119 • 120 • 121 • 122 • 123 • 124 • 125 • 126 • 127 • 128 • 129 • 130 • 131 • 132 • 133 • 134 • 135 • 136 • 137 • 138 • 139 • 140 • 141 • 142 • 143 • 144 • 145 • 146 • 147 • 148 • 149 • 150 • 151 • 152 • 153 • 154
- A Lover's Complaint
- Venus and Adonis
- The Rape of Lucrece
- The Phoenix and the Turtle

== Apocrypha ==
=== Plays ===
- Sir Thomas More
- The History of Cardenio (lost)
- Love's Labour's Won (lost)
- The Birth of Merlin
- Locrine
- The London Prodigal
- The Puritan
- The Second Maiden's Tragedy
- Double Falsehood
- Thomas of Woodstock
- Sir John Oldcastle
- Thomas Lord Cromwell
- A Yorkshire Tragedy
- Fair Em
- Mucedorus
- The Merry Devil of Edmonton
- Arden of Faversham
- Edmund Ironside
- Vortigern and Rowena
- Ur-Hamlet
- Ireland Shakespeare forgeries

=== Poetry ===
- A Funeral Elegy
- The Passionate Pilgrim
- To the Queen

== Analyses ==
- Shakespeare's editors
- Shakespeare attribution studies
- Shakespeare authorship question
- Shakespeare's writing style
- Timeline of Shakespeare criticism

== Life ==
- Shakespeare's Birthplace
- Shakespeare garden
- Shakespeare's Globe
- Shakespeare's handwriting
- Shakespeare in performance
- Portraits of Shakespeare
- Religious views of William Shakespeare
- Shakespeare's reputation
- Sexuality of William Shakespeare
- Spelling of Shakespeare's name
- Stratford-upon-Avon
- Shakespeare's will

=== Family of William Shakespeare ===
Shakespeare coat of arms

- Shakespeare family
  - Richard Shakespeare – grandfather
  - John Shakespeare – father
  - Mary Shakespeare (née Arden) – mother
  - Edmund Shakespeare – brother
  - Gilbert Shakespeare – brother
  - Joan Hart (née Shakespeare) – sister
  - Anne Hathaway – wife
  - Hamnet Shakespeare – son
  - Judith Quiney (née Shakespeare) – daughter
  - Thomas Quiney – son-in-law
  - Susanna Hall (née Shakespeare) – daughter
  - John Hall – son-in-law
  - Elizabeth Bernard (née Hall, formerly Nash) – granddaughter
- Shakespeare baronets
  - Geoffrey Shakespeare – descendant of Richard Shakespeare
  - Tom Shakespeare – grandson of Geoffrey Shakespeare

=== Associated people ===
- Robert Armin
- Matteo Bandello
- Cuthbert Burbage
- Richard Burbage
- Robert Chester (poet)
- Henry Condell
- The Dark Lady
- Leonard Digges (writer)
- Fair Youth
- Richard Field (printer)
- John Fletcher (playwright)
- Archibald Dennis Flower
- Samuel Gilburne
- John Heminges
- Ben Jonson
- William Kempe
- Edward Knight (King's Men)
- Emilia Lanier
- John Manningham
- Mr W.H.
- Augustine Phillips
- Rival Poet
- Henry Wriothesley, 3rd Earl of Southampton
- Nahum Tate
- Anne Whateley
- George Wilkins
- Henry Willobie

== Legacy ==
Shakespeare's influence – in addition to his works, Shakespeare's legacy includes the ongoing performance of his plays, and his influence upon culture and the arts, extending from theatre and literature to present-day movies and the English language itself.

- Adaptations of works by William Shakespeare
- List of titles of works based on Shakespearean phrases
- Cultural references to Hamlet
- Cultural references to Ophelia
- Cultural references to Othello

=== Memorials and monuments ===
- Memorials to William Shakespeare
  - Shakespeare's funerary monument
- Statue of William Shakespeare, Leicester Square
- Shakespeare's Way

=== Shakespearean phrases ===
List of idioms attributed to Shakespeare

- Phrases from Hamlet in common English
- "All that glitters is not gold"
- "All the world's a stage"
- "All's Well That Ends Well"
- "Band of brothers"
- "Beast with two backs"
- "Between you and I"
- "Brave new world"
- "By the pricking of my thumbs"
- "The dogs of war"
- "Et tu, Brute?"
- "Even a worm will turn"
- "Friends, Romans, countrymen, lend me your ears"
- "Hoist with his own petard"
- "Honorificabilitudinitatibus"
- "Ides of March"
- "The lady doth protest too much, methinks"
- "Let's kill all the lawyers"
- "Mortal coil"
- "Much Ado About Nothing"
- "Once more unto the breach"
- "The quality of mercy"
- "A rose by any other name would smell as sweet"
- "Salad days"
- "Star-crossed"
- "There's the rub"
- "Thy name is"
- "To be, or not to be"
- "Tomorrow and tomorrow and tomorrow"
- "What a piece of work is a man"
- "What's past is prologue"
- "Winter of Discontent"

=== Shakespearean theatre ===
- Shakespeare festivals
  - Shakespeare in the Park festivals
- List of William Shakespeare screen adaptations
  - BBC Television Shakespeare
  - Shakespeare: The Animated Tales
- ShakespeaRe-Told
- Shakespearean theatres
  - Shakespeare's Globe Centres
- Category:Shakespearean theatre companies
- Shakespeare Theatre Association

=== Works about Shakespeare ===
- Asimov's Guide to Shakespeare
- Complete Works
- Timeline of Shakespeare criticism
- The Herbal Bed
- Lear, Tolstoy and the Fool
- Nothing Like the Sun: A Story of Shakespeare's Love Life
- The Quest for Shakespeare
- Shakespeare
- Shakespeare's Kings
- Shakespeare's Politics
- Shakespeare: The World as Stage
- William Shakespeare

==== Fictional works about Shakespeare ====
- Shakespeare in Love
- Upstart Crow

== See also ==
- Outline of literature
- Outline of poetry
- Outline of theatre
