= When Love Speaks =

2002 compilation album of interpretations of Shakespeare's sonnets

Compilation album by Various artists
- Released: 23 April 2002
- Label: EMI Classics

Professional ratings
Review scores
Source	Rating
AllMusic	4/5 stars

When Love Speaks is a compilation album that features interpretations of William Shakespeare's sonnets – some spoken, some set to music – and excerpts from his plays by famous actors and musicians, released under EMI Classics in April 2002. The original idea came from Joy Gelardi (now Joy Beresford Frye) who proposed the album as a fund raiser for Shakespeare’s Globe Theatre. When that plan fell through, Joy and Michael Kamen, together with Alan Rickman, co-produced it in support of Royal Academy of Dramatic Art – where most of the actors on the album had studied. Rickman chose the title, which alludes to a speech in Love's Labour's Lost – "And when love speaks, the voice featuredof all the gods make heaven drowsy with the harmony." – which is, however, not on the album.

Richard Attenborough and Michael Kamen backed the album and recruited artists to participate, the launch took place at The Old Vic.

== Track listing ==
1. "Be not afeard, the isle is full of noises" (from The Tempest – Act III, Scene II), performed by Joseph Fiennes
2. "Live With Me and Be My Love" (from The Passionate Shepherd to His Love, Christopher Marlowe), set to music and sung by Annie Lennox
3. "As an unperfect actor on the stage" ("Sonnet 23"), performed by John Gielgud
4. "My mistress' eyes are nothing like the sun" ("Sonnet 130"), performed by Alan Rickman
5. "Why is my verse so barren of new pride" ("Sonnet 76"), performed by Diana Rigg
6. "Who will believe my verse in time to come" ("Sonnet 17"), performed by Richard Attenborough
7. "That you were once unkind befriends me now" ("Sonnet 120"), performed by Paul Rhys
8. "How oft, when thou, my music" ("Sonnet 128"), performed by Juliet Stevenson
9. "When, in disgrace with fortune and men's eyes" ("Sonnet 29"), set to music and sung by Rufus Wainwright
10. "Being your slave, what should I do but tend" ("Sonnet 57"), performed by Janet McTeer
11. "Tired with all these, for restful death I cry" ("Sonnet 66"), performed by Alan Bates
12. "When I consider everything that grows" ("Sonnet 15"), performed by Marianne Jean-Baptiste
13. "Let those who are in favour with their stars" ("Sonnet 25"), performed by David Warner
14. "They that have power to hurt and will do none" ("Sonnet 94"), performed by Siân Phillips
15. "Those lips that Love's own hand did make" ("Sonnet 145"), performed by John Hurt
16. "Come again, sweet love doth now invite" (John Dowland) sung by John Potter
17. "Th'expense of spirit in a waste of shame" ("Sonnet 129"), performed by Ralph Fiennes
18. "Thine eyes I love, and they, as pitying me" ("Sonnet 132"), performed by Matthew Rhys
19. "I never saw that you did painting need" ("Sonnet 83"), performed by Imelda Staunton
20. "When to the sessions of sweet silent thought" ("Sonnet 30"), performed by Kenneth Branagh
21. "Is it thy will thy image should keep open" ("Sonnet 61"), performed by Fiona Shaw
22. "Mine eye and heart are at a mortal war" ("Sonnet 46"), performed by Henry Goodman
23. "No more be grieved at that which thou hast done" ("Sonnet 35"), set to music and sung by Keb' Mo'
24. "O never say that I was false of heart" ("Sonnet 109"), performed by Susannah York
25. "Look in thy glass and tell the face thou viewest" ("Sonnet 3"), performed by Timothy Spall
26. "Some glory in their birth, some in their skill" ("Sonnet 91"), performed by Peter Barkworth
27. "How heavy do I journey on the way" ("Sonnet 50"), performed by Gemma Jones
28. "Since brass, nor stone, nor earth, nor boundless sea" ("Sonnet 65"), performed by Jonathan Pryce
29. "Like as the waves make towards the pebbled shore" ("Sonnet 60"), performed by Richard Wilson
30. "The quality of mercy is not strained" (from The Merchant of Venice – Act IV, Scene I), set to music and sung by Des'ree
31. "Sweet love, renew thy force; be it not said" ("Sonnet 56"), performed by Tom Courtenay
32. "Since I left you, mine eye is in my mind" ("Sonnet 113"), performed by Zoe Waites
33. "Be wise as thou art cruel; do not press" ("Sonnet 140"), performed by Edward Fox
34. "Is it for fear to wet a widow's eye" ("Sonnet 9"), performed by Trevor Eve
35. "So it is not with me as with that Muse" ("Sonnet 21"), performed by Imogen Stubbs
36. "Devouring Time, blunt thou the lion's paws" ("Sonnet 19"), performed by David Harewood
37. "The Willow Song" (from Othello – Act IV, Scene III), sung by Barbara Bonney
38. "When my love swears that she is made of truth" ("Sonnet 138"), performed by Richard Johnson
39. "When I do count the clock that tells the time" ("Sonnet 12"), performed by Martin Jarvis
40. "What potions have I drunk of siren tears" ("Sonnet 119"), performed by Roger Hammond
41. "Not marble nor the gilded monuments" ("Sonnet 55"), performed by Richard Briers
42. "Sin of self-love possesseth all mine eye" ("Sonnet 62"), performed by John Sessions
43. "Let me not to the marriage of true minds" ("Sonnet 116"), performed by Thelma Holt
44. "Music to hear, why hearst thou music sadly" ("Sonnet 8"), set to music by Joseph Shabalala and sung by Ladysmith Black Mambazo
45. "When forty winters shall besiege thy brow" ("Sonnet 2"), performed by Caroline Blakiston
46. "No longer mourn for me when I am dead" ("Sonnet 71"), performed by Peter Bowles
47. "In faith, I do not love thee with mine eyes" ("Sonnet 141"), performed by Sylvia Syms
48. "Why didst thou promise such a beauteous day" ("Sonnet 34"), performed by Robert Lindsay
49. "Not from the stars do I my judgement pluck" ("Sonnet 14"), performed by Ioan Gruffudd
50. "My love is as a fever, longing still" ("Sonnet 147"), performed by John Hurt
51. "The little Love-God lying once asleep" ("Sonnet 154"), performed by Bohdan Poraj
52. "Shall I compare thee to a summer's day" ("Sonnet 18"), sung by Bryan Ferry
53. "Our revels are now ended" (from The Tempest – Act IV, Scene I), performed by Joseph Fiennes

== Personnel ==
=== Musicians ===
- Barbara Bonney – soprano
- Caroline Dale – cello
- Des'ree – voice
- Bryan Ferry – voice
- Charles Green – clarinet
- Barry Guy – double bass
- Maya Homburger – baroque violin
- Michael Kamen – piano, arranger, composer, conductor, producer, liner notes, executive producer, string arrangements
- Keb' Mo' – voice
- Ladysmith Black Mambazo – voice
- Annie Lennox – voice
- Anna McGarrigle – accordion
- Kate McGarrigle – banjo
- Michel Pépin – bass, guitar, producer, engineer, mixing
- John Potter – voice
- John Surman – tenor saxophone
- Stephen Stubbs – lute
- Gillian Tingay – harp
- Matthew Wadsworth – lute
- Rufus Wainwright – piano, vocals, composer, producer
- Joel Zifkin – violin

=== Production ===
- Tony Bridge – mastering
- Tim Atack – mixing
- James Brett – producer, engineer, mixing
- Joseph Shabalala – arranger, producer
- Geoff Foster – engineer
- Martin Jarvis – engineer
- Anthony (Tony) Fisher – engineer
- Brian Tench – engineer
- Ned Douglas – engineer
- Robert Lindsay – engineer
- Don Murnaghan – engineer, mixing
- Iain Roberton – engineer, mixing
- Mark Johnson – engineer, mixing
- Stephen McLaughlin – engineer, mixing
- Ash Howes – mixing
- Ricky Graham – mixing
- Peter Cobbin – pre-mastering

Producers

- Richard Attenborough – liner notes
- Nicholas Barter – liner notes
- Andrew Brown
- Des'ree
- Manfred Eicher
- Bryan Ferry
- Annie Lennox
- Robin Trower
- Alan Rickman
- Prince Sampson
