= Sonnet 6 =

« » Sonnet 6
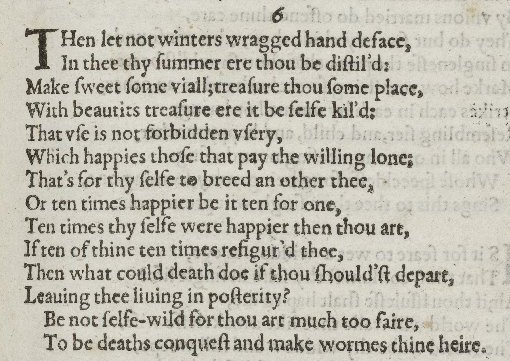
- Sonnet 6 in the 1609 Quarto
Q1
Q2
Q3
C
Then let not winter’s ragged hand deface
In thee thy summer, ere thou be distill’d:
Make sweet some vial; treasure thou some place
With beauty’s treasure, ere it be self-kill’d.
That use is not forbidden usury,
Which happies those that pay the willing loan;
That’s for thyself to breed another thee,
Or ten times happier, be it ten for one;
Ten times thyself were happier than thou art,
If ten of thine ten times refigur’d thee:
Then what could death do, if thou shouldst depart,
Leaving thee living in posterity?
Be not self-will’d, for thou art much too fair
To be death’s conquest and make worms thine heir.
—William Shakespeare
4
8
12
14

Sonnet 6 is one of 154 sonnets written by the English playwright and poet William Shakespeare. It is a procreation sonnet within the Fair Youth sequence. The sonnet continues Sonnet 5, thus forming a diptych. It also contains the same distillatory trope featured in Sonnet 54, Sonnet 74 and Sonnet 119.

== Structure ==
Sonnet 6 is an English or Shakespearean sonnet, constructed of three quatrains followed by a couplet, all in iambic pentameter, with the typical rhyme scheme of the English sonnet, ABAB CDCD EFEF GG. Most of the poem exemplifies the regular metrical alternation characteristic of iambic pentameter, as can be seen in the couplet:

 ×  /   ×    /       ×    /  ×    /    ×   / 
Be not self-willed, for thou art much too fair

 ×  /  ×       /  ×    /    ×    /      ×    / 
To be death's conquest and make worms thine heir. (6.13-14)

/ = ictus, a metrically strong syllabic position. × = nonictus.

However, both these lines allow an alternative scansion, which may highlight a parallelism between "self-willed" and "death's conquest":

 ×  ×   /    /       ×    /  ×    /    ×   / 
Be not self-willed, for thou art much too fair

 ×  ×  /       /  ×    /    ×    /      ×    / 
To be death's conquest and make worms thine heir. (6.13-14)

== Analysis ==
The opening line of this sonnet leads directly from the end of Sonnet 5, as though the two poems were intended as one, itself perhaps a reference to the idea of pairing through marriage that shapes the first 17 sonnets. The first line, “Then let not winters wragged hand deface,” also parallels Sonnet 64’s opening, “When I haue seene by times fell hand defaced.”

The third line's sweet "vial" refers to the distillation of perfume from petals mentioned in Sonnet 5, but is now directly explained and expanded as an image of sexual impregnation in order to produce children. In addition to the glass beaker, "vial" was also traditionally used of the womb: the OED cites John Lydgate’s invocation to the Blessed Virgin, “O glorious viole, O vitre inviolate.”

The language of accounting is repeated from Sonnet 4. The image of "usury" refers to replication of the invested "essence" in offspring, in the same way that money earns interest. The propagation of children can never be exploitative. Shakespeare's own father had been accused in 1570 of usury, of charging 20% and 25% interest. Elizabethan divines preached uncompromisingly against usury in principle but often tolerated it in practice: the Usury Act 1571 (13 Eliz. 1. c. 8), while providing punishments for usury above and below 10%, unwittingly legitimized a standard interest rate of 10%. Thus, Shakespeare plays with tens, and a tenfold return on the investment is to be desired.
