= Sonnet 128 =

« » Sonnet 128
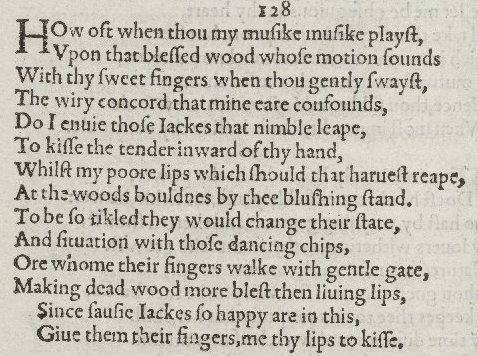
- Sonnet 128 in the 1609 Quarto
Q1
Q2
Q3
C
How oft, when thou, my music, music play’st,
Upon that blessed wood whose motion sounds
With thy sweet fingers, when thou gently sway’st
The wiry concord that mine ear confounds,
Do I envy those jacks that nimble leap
To kiss the tender inward of thy hand,
Whilst my poor lips, which should that harvest reap,
At the wood’s boldness by thee blushing stand.
To be so tickled, they would change their state
And situation with those dancing chips,
O’er whom thy fingers walk with gentle gait,
Making dead wood more blest than living lips.
Since saucy jacks so happy are in this,
Give them thy fingers, me thy lips to kiss.
—William Shakespeare
4
8
12
14

Sonnet 128 is one of William Shakespeare's sonnets.

== Synopsis ==
Sonnet 128 is comparable to the sonnet in Romeo and Juliet in which Romeo pleads for a first kiss. Like that pilgrim/saint tête-à-tête, this sonnet is set in a public musical celebration. Shakespeare watches his dark lady play the keyboard virginals (or Bassano-built clavichord), captivated by her back swaying with the melody. Like Romeo, he longs for a kiss, but in this sonnet he envies the jacks (wooden keys) that the lady's playing fingers "tickle" while trilling the notes. Perhaps he also envies the other men (Jacks) standing around the lady. Surely, this is an amusing scene to Shakespeare because he secretly is having an affair with the dark lady. He decides not to envy those keys—although he would like to be tickled as they are—but hopes instead to receive a kiss on his lips. Fred Blick points out that this plea for a "kiss", leaving the fingers to the jacks, is a compromise, just as the tuning of the virginals or other keyboard instrument is, in musical temperament, a compromise.

== Structure ==
Sonnet 128 is an English or Shakespearean sonnet. The English sonnet has three quatrains, followed by a final rhyming couplet. It follows the typical rhyme scheme of the form ABAB CDCD EFEF GG and is composed in iambic pentameter, a type of poetic metre based on five pairs of metrically weak/strong syllabic positions. The 2nd line exemplifies a regular iambic pentameter:

× /    ×    /  ×   /     ×    /  ×   / 
Upon that blessed wood whose motion sounds (128.2)

/ = ictus, a metrically strong syllabic position. × = nonictus.

The 8th line exhibits a rightward movement of the first ictus (resulting in a four-position figure, × × / /, sometimes referred to as a minor ionic); potentially there is also a second minor ionic (from movement of the third ictus) but this depends upon the reader's emphasis:

×    ×  /      /   ×    ×   /    /  ×     / 
At the wood's boldness by thee blushing stand. (128.8)

Potential minor ionics also occur in lines 3, 7, and 9.

Line 12 could begin regularly, with an initial reversal, or with a minor ionic; the antithesis between "dead wood" and "living lips" suggests the latter.

The meter strongly suggests that line 5's "envy" should be stressed on the second syllable (a valid pronunciation in Shakespeare's time).

== Context ==
Shakespeare's sonnets were published in 1609. It is not certain when each of the sonnets were written but there is evidence to suggest that they were written privately and not meant to be published. William Wordsworth even suggests that the sonnets were how Shakespeare "unlocked his heart". There are only two sonnets that Shakespeare writes that are specifically about music, and those are Sonnet 8 and Sonnet 128. No one is certain if Shakespeare wrote the sonnets in order or if they should form a complete sequence. However it is clear that they offer an insight that "Shakespeare's capacity to represent the imaginative states of other people".

Shakespeare was born in the Elizabethan Era and would certainly have been influenced by culture of that time. According to Henry Threw Stephenson, this time was characterized by a "general freedom of manners". He also points out that people were much more coarse in their discourse during that time and even Queen Elizabeth "swore like a trooper". This could allow Shakespeare to be more crude in his allusions and not hesitate to bring up more indecent sexual imagery without being criticized. During that time in history the bubonic plague was raging throughout Europe, and this meant that many London theaters were frequently shut down, which could have influenced Shakespeare to write more poetic literature and less for a stage audience. This lack of work might have also been able to provide him with more time to ponder and express his feelings of love.

== Analysis ==
In her article "The Gaze of the Listener: Shakespeare's Sonnet 128 and Early Modern Discourses of Music and Gender", Regula Hohl Trillini argues that that "[the] much deprecated cruxes and mixed metaphors are read not as an authorial oversights but as a significant elaboration of contradictions in the English discourse on musical performance, particularly when undertaken by women".

Sonnet 128 is one of the sonnets in the Dark Lady series. Sonnet 128 has often been said to be a complimentary sonnet to the Dark Lady and her musical talents. Shakespeare uses this sonnet as a comparison of his lust for the Dark Lady through musical metaphors. For example, Shakespeare in the first stanza of the sonnet compares the Dark Lady's playing of the virginals, a musical instrument similar to the piano, to his want for the Dark Lady to be touching him instead of the virginals. Shakespeare plays off the phrase, "jacks that nimble leap" giving it a sexual connotation. In the virginals a jack was the, "upright piece of wood fixed to the back of the key-lever, and fitted with a quill which plucked the string as the jack rose on the key's being pressed down". Shakespeare has been criticized for possibly using the word jacks in the wrong sense, but Shakespeare sexualizes "jacks" in line five and thirteen. Through the use of the word leaping in this phrase, Shakespeare uses word play on the word virginal using it in the virgin sense. And at the end of the sonnet, Shakespeare refers to jacks as "saucy" giving it another sexual connotation. Shakespeare plays off the idea that the jacks are leaping into the Dark Lady, and kissing her inner hands. This interpretation is highly criticized, and other critics believe that Shakespeare just carelessly used the word jacks wrong because of his infatuation with the Dark Lady. At the end of the sonnet, Shakespeare concludes in the last two lines with, "Since saucy jacks so happy are in this, / Give them thy fingers, me thy lips to kiss." Here, Shakespeare ends the poem with the idea that the Dark Lady should kiss him after teasing him with her musical talent throughout the poem.

Agreeing with Hohl Trillini, Paul Edmondson in his book, "Shakespeare's Sonnets" writes about the speaker's lover in Sonnet 128. Edmondson agrees that the sonnet belongs in the Dark Lady series, and also agrees that the sonnet uses many musical allusions and metaphors for the speaker's feelings towards his lover. The speaker in Sonnet 128 is clearly attracted to the woman playing the instrument in the sonnet, but the speaker is not solely attracted to the woman's physical appearance. Edmonson writes, "The sensual touch of his lover's fingers seems to make the poetic voice laugh at the end of this sonnet as Shakespeare refers to the tickling of the instrument's keys, the 'saucy jacks' which like sexual organs can move and respond to the power of a lover's nimble and caressing hands". Thus, making the statement that the speaker in Sonnet 128 is not only attracted to the woman, but the woman's musical talent is part of her attraction.

=== Musical imagery ===
Sonnet 128 is one of the few musical sonnets of Shakespeare's sonnets. Sonnet 128 draws many similarities to Shakespeare's Sonnet 8, and its musical language and theme. Both sonnets refer "my musike", throughout drawing a clear connection to each other. In addition, both sonnets use, a "figurative use of 'music,'" which appears nowhere else in Shakespeare's sonnets. The use of similar language throughout Sonnet 8 and Sonnet 128 continues the musical theme in Shakespeare's sonnets, showing an obvious correlation between the two poems.

Its number suggests, like Sonnet 8, the octave of the scale as well as the 12 notes on the keyboard inside each octave (an association first recognized and described in detail by Fred Blick, in "Shakespeare's Musical Sonnets, Numbers 8, 128 and Pythagoras", 'The Upstart Crow, A Shakespeare Journal', Vol. XIX, (1999) 152–168.) Further, Blick notes that in Pythagorean musical theory the proportion of the octave is 1:2 and that on this basis the intervals between 8 and 128 i.e. 8–16, 16–32, 32–64, 64–128, span four octaves, the normal range of the keyboard of a virginals in Shakespeare's time.

The main imagery that Shakespeare invokes in this poem is of a woman playing a harpsichord or virginals. According to the Encyclopædia Britannica, this was an early version of a piano that was often made of wood. Shakespeare appears very familiar with the instrument because he references the "concord", which is the sound made by the string of the harpsichord, that confounds his auditory senses. The instrument itself takes on a personification that the woman is able to "tickle" and make dance in a way that elevates the speaker's emotions and affections. Tickling in this sense also has some sexual connotations since this poem is riddled with sensual innuendo. The instrument being a descendant of a virginals, which could imply a sense of purity about the love interest. Trillini explains that at that time to harpsichords could be perceived as "divinely admirable or hellishly tempting". In this way it can be implied that Shakespeare not only finds the woman's music itself tempting, but the act of her producing music equally as appealing.

Line 5 mentions jacks, which are the plucking mechanisms on the harpsichord. The jacks "nimble leap" which is both representative of the music being played and the men who are trying to show off to win the love interest's attention. Davis explains Shakespeare often uses the word Jack as a reference to ordinary other men but in this case it can have a double meaning of both the technology of the instrument and the woman's other male suitors. Line 13 also provides reference to "saucy jacks" which implies that the jacks are a rather impure and impudent lot. There is also a strong sexual innuendo where the word jacks makes a reference to fellatio. Shakespeare asserts that this woman can lend her fingers to these vulgar men but would much prefer her lips and her loving affections.

=== Criticisms ===
Sonnet 128 is one of Shakespeare's most highly criticized sonnets, some even believing that because Sonnet 128 is so far from Shakespeare's usual sonnets that it may be unauthentic. According to Richard Purdum in his article, Shakespeare's Sonnet 128, Sonnet 128 is "Un-Shakespearean in sound and rhythm". Sonnet 128 strays from Shakespeare's usual diction, and thus creates its own category in Shakespearean sonnets. H. T. S. Frost said, "Six trifling pieces of little interest – literary or otherwise," referring to the other Dark Lady pieces and their often criticized language like Sonnet 128 and their ill placement with Shakespeare's other sonnets. J. M. Robertson also agrees with Frost's argument that Sonnet 128 and the other Dark Lady sonnets do not fit with Shakespeare's other sonnets. Purdum continues his argument stating that maybe because Shakespeare was writing about the Dark Lady, that his poor quality sonnet was caused by his growing infatuation with the Dark Lady. Purdum, and other critics such as, Barbara A. Mackenzie believe that Shakespeare's immense infatuation with the Dark Lady lead to Shakespeare failing to correct his mistakes within Sonnet 128.

On the other hand, J.A. Fort offers a marginal defense of Sonnet 128 claiming that because the sonnet was about the Dark Lady, it should be viewed as only a compliment piece to her, and nothing else. Fort, acknowledges Shakespeare's strange and almost un-Shakespearean language, but only credits it to Shakespeare's extreme infatuation with the Dark lady. In addition, because Shakespeare was so deeply infatuated with the Dark Lady, he may have wanted to separate the sonnets about her from his other work, making those sonnets unique.

== Interpretations ==
- Juliet Stevenson, for the 2002 compilation album, When Love Speaks (EMI Classics)
