= Sonnet 5 =

« » Sonnet 5
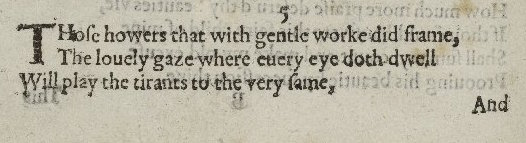
- The first three lines of Sonnet 5 in the 1609 Quarto
Q1
Q2
Q3
C
Those hours that with gentle work did frame
The lovely gaze where every eye doth dwell,
Will play the tyrants to the very same
And that unfair which fairly doth excel:
For never-resting time leads summer on
To hideous winter and confounds him there;
Sap check’d with frost and lusty leaves quite gone,
Beauty o’ersnow’d and bareness every where:
Then, were not summer’s distillation left,
A liquid prisoner pent in walls of glass,
Beauty’s effect with beauty were bereft,
Nor it, nor no remembrance what it was:
But flowers distill’d, though they with winter meet,
Leese but their show; their substance still lives sweet.
—William Shakespeare
4
8
12
14

Sonnet 5 is one of 154 sonnets written by the English playwright and poet William Shakespeare. It is a procreation sonnet within the Fair Youth sequence. Sonnet 5 is linked to Sonnet 6, which continues the theme of distillation.

== Structure ==
Sonnet 5 is an English or Shakespearean sonnet. English sonnets consist of three quatrains followed by a couplet. This sonnet follows the form's typical rhyme scheme, ABAB CDCD EFEF GG. The first line is regular, but contains a syllabic expansion: "hours" is to be read as two syllables, a reading which is clearer in the Quarto's spelling, "howers". Lines eight, eleven, and fourteen contain initial reversals, a frequent variation in iambic pentameter.

  ×    / ×    /   ×    /  ×   /    ×    /
Those hours that with gentle work did frame (5.1)

 /   ×   ×  /    ×    /   ×  /    × / 
Beauty's effect with beauty were bereft. (5.11)

/ = ictus, a metrically strong syllabic position. × = nonictus.

== Analysis ==
It repeats the emphasis on human aging, compared with progress of the seasons. The “howers,” with which Sonnet 5, the first of a pair of sonnets, opens are the classical ‘Hours,’ the Horae or ‘Ωραι, daughters of Zeus and Themis, who presided over the seasons – hora can also mean ‘season’ – and their products were thought to engender ripeness in nature and the prime of human life. But the hours, which created his look, will in time act as destructive tyrants and make “vnfaire” that which in its fairness excels.

The final couplet about "distilled flowers" refers to the extraction of perfume from petals, in which the visible "show" of the flowers disappears, but their "essence" remains. The same distillatory trope recurs in Sonnet 54, Sonnet 74 and Sonnet 119. The reference is probably to the Youth's "seed" - his capacity to prolong his "essence" by producing children, but it is also an example of Shakespeare's play on the question of what is transient and what eternal in the material world.
