= Sonnet 113 =

« » Sonnet 113
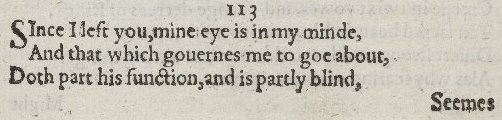
- The first three lines of Sonnet 113 in the 1609 Quarto
Q1
Q2
Q3
C
Since I left you mine eye is in my mind,
And that which governs me to go about
Doth part his function and is partly blind,
Seems seeing, but effectually is out;
For it no form delivers to the heart
Of bird, of flower, or shape, which it doth latch:
Of his quick object hath the mind no part,
Nor his own vision holds what it doth catch;
For if it see the rud’st or gentlest sight,
The most sweet favour or deformed’st creature,
The mountain or the sea, the day or night,
The crow or dove, it shapes them to your feature:
Incapable of more, replete with you,
My most true mind thus maketh mine untrue.
—William Shakespeare
4
8
12
14

Sonnet 113 is one of 154 sonnets written by the English playwright and poet William Shakespeare. It's a member of the Fair Youth sequence, in which the poet expresses his love towards a young man.

== Synopsis ==
Since he left his beloved, the poet can think of nothing else. His eye no longer sees the outer world, only the image of the beloved. Birds, flowers and other forms cannot enter his mind since it is filled with the image of his love. Whatever he sees, ugly or beautiful, is transformed into the beloved, and so the perfect inner image makes his outer vision false.

== Structure ==
Sonnet 113 is an English or Shakespearean sonnet. The English sonnet has three quatrains, followed by a final rhyming couplet. It follows the typical rhyme scheme of the form ABAB CDCD EFEF GG and is composed in iambic pentameter, a type of poetic metre based on five pairs of metrically weak/strong syllabic positions. The 11th line exemplifies a regular iambic pentameter:

  ×  /   ×   /    ×  /     ×  /  ×   / 
The mountain or the sea, the day or night, (113.11)

Indeed, all fourteen lines may be scanned regularly, excepting the final extrametrical syllables or feminine endings in lines 10 and 12:

  ×   /   ×   /    ×    /      ×   /  ×    / (×) 
The crow, or dove, it shapes them to your feature. (113.12)

/ = ictus, a metrically strong syllabic position. × = nonictus. (×) = extrametrical syllable.

The meter demands a few variant pronunciations: Line 4's "effectually" functions as four syllables, and line 6's "flower" as one. There are also several contractions which are unusual to modern ears: Line 9's "rud'st" and line 10's "deformèd'st" of which Stephen Booth says, "[b]oth words demonstrate their sense; they are contorted alternatives for 'rudest' and 'most deformed'". Finally, the Quarto's metrical "maketh mine" in line 14 is rejected by some editors, typically requiring an emendation with an unusual pronunciation, as for example Kerrigan's "mak'th mine eye", or Booth's "maketh m'eyne" (m'eyne = "my eyes").

== Interpretations ==
- Zoe Waites, for the 2002 compilation album, When Love Speaks (EMI Classics)
