= Sonnet 129 =

Poem by William Shakespeare

« » Sonnet 129
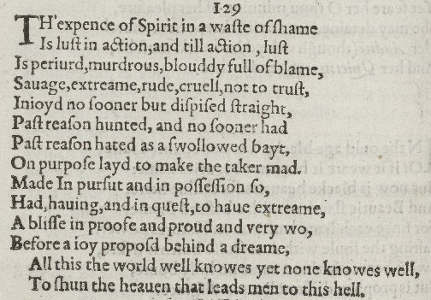
- Sonnet 129 in the 1609 Quarto
Q1
Q2
Q3
C
The expense of spirit in a waste of shame
Is lust in action; and till action, lust
Is perjur’d, murderous, bloody, full of blame,
Savage, extreme, rude, cruel, not to trust;
Enjoy’d no sooner but despised straight;
Past reason hunted; and no sooner had,
Past reason hated, as a swallow’d bait,
On purpose laid to make the taker mad:
Mad in pursuit, and in possession so;
Had, having, and in quest to have, extreme;
A bliss in proof, and prov’d, a very woe;
Before, a joy propos’d; behind, a dream.
All this the world well knows; yet none knows well
To shun the heaven that leads men to this hell.
—William Shakespeare
4
8
12
14

Sonnet 129 is one of the 154 sonnets written by William Shakespeare and published in the 1609 Quarto. It is considered one of the "Dark Lady" sonnets (127–152).

== Overview ==
Sonnet 129 considers the emotional experience of the act of physical love as it progresses in time: first the anticipation of lust, then the consummation, followed by the complete shift in mood of the aftermath. The sonnet in spirit resembles a passionate dramatic monologue, and seems to be expressed by a man who looks back at such an act of love with bitter fury at its contrasting aspects. The sonnet begins with a howl of disgust, as the poet condemns the experience, listing negative aspects of lust in anticipation: It can cause a man to be dishonest, brutal, shameful, savage, and cruel. The moment lust is satisfied, it is despised the way a fish (or other animal) might despise the bait it has swallowed. The poem ends with the couplet pointing out that though all men are aware that love in action may provide pleasure, it ends with a deep wretchedness; but still they can't resist. This sonnet is one of the most impersonal, in that only one other sonnet in the quarto collection (sonnet 94) excludes the characters of both the poet and the subject, which in this case would be the dark lady. "Sonnet 129 fixes and deprecates lust with such murderous precision..."

== Structure ==
Sonnet 129 is an English or Shakespearean sonnet. The English sonnet has three quatrains, followed by a final rhyming couplet. It follows the typical rhyme scheme of the form ABAB CDCD EFEF GG and is composed in iambic pentameter, a type of poetic metre based on five pairs of metrically weak/strong syllabic positions. The 8th line exemplifies a regular iambic pentameter:

×   /  ×    /    ×  /     ×  / ×   / 
On purpose laid to make the taker mad: (129.8)

/ = ictus, a metrically strong syllabic position. × = nonictus.

Line 4 begins with a common metrical variant, the initial reversal:

 / ×    ×   /     ×      /×    /   ×   / 
Savage, extreme, rude, cruel, not to trust; (129.4)

The stressed nonictus "rude" increases the heaviness of the list. An initial reversal is also found in line 9; mid-line reversals potentially occur in lines 9 and 14.

The meter demands a few variant pronunciations: line 3's "murderous" functions as two syllables, line 5's "despised" as three, and line 14's "heaven" as one.

== Context ==
Sonnet 129 is set between two relatively light and heavy sonnets. Scholars tend to play down its inherent darkness. Despite its intensity and harsh tone, it may have been written from a detached viewpoint. Shakespeare is capable of portraying issues and evoking emotions without having any personal involvement or experience in them. Such examples are shown when he depicts the lust of Tarquin in The Rape of Lucrece; he also looked into the scheming of Angelo in Measure for Measure, a man whose sexual appetite causes a rippling effect on his life; he was also able to portray the jealousy, racism, and passion in Othello. Shakespeare uses a similar theme again with Leontes in his play, The Winter's Tale.

The placement of the sonnet leads many to believe that Shakespeare had a direct relation with the "dark lady" (as referenced as the inspiration for sonnets 127-152). Many scholars believe that Shakespeare had an affair and that a mistress was his inspiration for writing as many poems as he did. Even though such a relation was frowned on at the time, it has not been ruled out as a possibility. However, because there are no historical records that such a woman existed, there is not a sufficient evidence to determine whether the woman spoken of in the sonnets was real or fictitious. The sexual pessimism depicted in the sonnets, although extreme, is not unusual to the Christian tradition, especially in ancient times. Beliefs and standards of virginity and sexual abstention can be dated back to Pythagoras, and the views continued to be a tradition through Plato and the Stoics. Sexual pessimism existed before Christianity became a widespread religion.

== Exegesis ==
=== Overview ===
Sonnet 129 contains a description of the "physical and psychological devastation of 'lust'". Lust is a powerful emotional and physical desire that feels overwhelmingly like heaven in the beginning but can, and often does, end up being more like its own torturous hell in the end. During the time in which Shakespeare wrote Sonnet 129, virginity was protected and women who were promiscuous or adulterers were shunned and this behaviour was not an acceptable societal behaviour. Lust drives the desire to be with another person, sometimes casting your social norms and ethical behaviour aside to fulfil that desire. When you give in to desire, or lust, and the act is complete, then the emotion of lust is filled with fear, anger, disgust and hate until the desire to feel lust again overtakes you. It's important to note that sexually transmitted diseases were not only common during this time period, but were often left untreated or incurable. Giving in to lust and desire was dangerous from not only a societal view but from a medical standpoint as well. Shakespeare's Sonnet 129 graphically displays the struggle between heaven and hell, lust and promiscuity and its aftermath. "The aura surrounding physical sex in this sonnet, an inextricable mingling of attraction and revulsion."

=== Quatrain 1 ===
The first quatrain expresses the thought that lust in action spends vital power (mind and semen), and before action lust is treacherous, murderous, brutal and cruel.

=== Quatrain 2 ===
Shakespeare's second quatrain tells the reader that "as soon as lust is experienced, it is immediately hated". "Beyond the control of reason" the aggressor is searching for and looking forward to the pleasure that awaits. Shakespeare's "context is equivalent 'to have intercourse', 'to possess sexually'". The hate that is experienced after lust, is almost "irrational as was the original pursuit and like a bait that a fish swallows".

=== Quatrain 3 ===
Shakespeare's third quatrain is interesting in that it changes "the words used to characterize the negative aspects of lust". Lust becomes "perceptibly weaker toward the end of the poem" than in the start. In the beginning of the sonnet, Shakespeare uses the words "Murd'rous", "bloody", "savage" and "cruel" and replaces them in this quatrain with "a very woe" and "a dream".

=== Couplet ===
The couplet that closes sonnet 129 is arguably a change in tone compared with the rest of the sonnet. "The concluding couplet is one expressing a wryly regretful acceptance of the inevitable, rather than constituting a climax to the angry denunciation of the opening lines."

== Interpretations ==
- Ralph Fiennes, for the 2002 compilation album, When Love Speaks (EMI Classics)
