= Sonnet 127 =

Poem by William Shakespeare

« » Sonnet 127
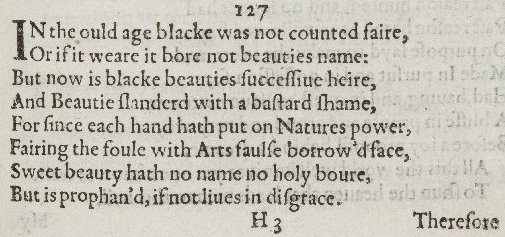
- The first eight lines of Sonnet 127 in the 1609 Quarto
Q1
Q2
Q3
C
In the old age black was not counted fair,
Or if it were, it bore not beauty’s name;
But now is black beauty’s successive heir,
And beauty slander’d with a bastard shame:
For since each hand hath put on nature’s power,
Fairing the foul with art’s false borrow’d face,
Sweet beauty hath no name, no holy bower,
But is profan’d, if not lives in disgrace.
Therefore my mistress’ eyes are raven black,
Her eyes so suited, and they mourners seem
At such who, not born fair, no beauty lack,
Slandering creation with a false esteem:
Yet so they mourn, becoming of their woe,
That every tongue says beauty should look so.
—William Shakespeare
4
8
12
14

Sonnet 127 of Shakespeare's sonnets (1609) is the first of the Dark Lady sequence (sonnets 127–152), called so because the poems make it clear that the speaker's mistress has black hair and eyes and dark skin. In this poem the speaker finds himself attracted to a woman who is not beautiful in the conventional sense, and explains it by declaring that because of cosmetics one can no longer discern between true and false beauties, so that the true beauties have been denigrated and out of favour.

== Structure ==
Sonnet 127 is an English or Shakespearean sonnet. The English sonnet has three quatrains, followed by a final rhyming couplet. It follows the typical rhyme scheme of the form ABAB CDCD EFEF GG and is composed in iambic pentameter, a type of poetic metre based on five pairs of metrically weak/strong syllabic positions. The 4th line exemplifies a regular iambic pentameter:

×    /   ×   /  ×     /   ×  /  ×     / 
And beauty slander'd with a bastard shame: (127.4)

/ = ictus, a metrically strong syllabic position. × = nonictus.

The first line contains two metrical variations: a mid-line reversal ("black was") and the rightward movement of the first ictus (resulting in a four-position figure, × × / /, sometimes referred to as a minor ionic):

×    × /   /     /    ×   ×   /   ×   / 
In the old age black was not counted fair, (127.1)

Mid-line reversals also occur in lines 3 and 8, while initial reversals occur in lines 6, 9, 12, and potentially in line 2. A second minor ionic potentially occurs in line 10.

The meter demands that line 12's "slandering" function as two syllables. Booth reads line 5's "pow'r" and line 7's "bow'r" as monosyllabic.

== Possible influences ==
Italian poet Francesco Petrarch, who was inspired by his love Laura, created the sonnet as a type of poetry. After his invention, the traditional Petrarchan theme became one of a "proud, virtuous lady and an abject, scorned lover". The sonnet form became very popular and was introduced into English Poetry by Wyatt and Surrey. Yet, Shakespeare's sonnets vary dramatically from those of his contemporaries. His sonnets are "very different from Petrarch, in whose love poems the processing of tradition and the establishment of new voices are no less complex, but more systematically present, active, and profound." There is also "relatively little of the platonic idealism that fills such works as Spenser's Amoretti in which the poet's love for his lady lifts him above human weakness to contemplation of the divine".

Sonnet 127 reflects changing definitions of beauty in early modern England. Around the 1600s, makeup began to become available to everyone, thus being used by the masses and influencing Shakespeare's perception of beauty. The past in which "black was not counted fair" refers to traditional Elizabethan era priority of light skin, hair, and eyes over dark.

== Dark Lady ==
Many suggest Shakespeare was influenced to write the Dark Lady Sonnets by a person. However, there is no consensus as to the identity of the dark lady; the Sonnets give away nothing referring to age, background or station in life.

The Dark Lady sonnets delve into sexuality, jealousy, and beauty. The first sonnet of this series, Sonnet 127, begins with Shakespeare's Speaker apologizing for his mistress's un-ideal beauty, associated with old age. Instead of shying away from unauthentic interpretation, he emphasizes his mistress's cruel and "black" state. Some understand "black" to represent more than a color. Ronald Levao sees it as interchangeable with the term foul.

The relationship between language and color is important for understanding the Dark Lady sonnets. Elizabeth Harvey explains: "The parallel between language and art was far from simple, and that rhetoric's colors depended upon a ghostly discourse of natural historical knowledge that invisibly shaped the chromatic lexicon of Shakespeare's sonnets." The meanings and qualities associated with color are not necessarily universal or timeless, however. Recent critics have made arguments linking darkness with race and ethnicity. Scholars of early modern colonialism find it appropriate to portray the sexual relationship as a white man being sexually attracted to a black woman.

The sonnet may also be understood as portraying an early reaction to women using cosmetics. The introduction of cosmetics should be viewed as a paradigm shift rather than a progression along the same spectrum. Margreta de Grazia reads Sonnet 127 in these terms: "Old values have been purged. Sweet beauty is stripped of her title (hath no name) and her sanctioned place (no holy boure), cast out into the contaminating open air (profaned) and thereby exposed to abuse and violation (in disgrace). In the place of 'beauties rose' now rules black." Helen Vendler also examines this sonnet with an eye on cosmetics, "How did a black haired, black eyed woman come to be the reigning heir of beauty? The sonnet explains that the invention of cosmetics disgraced true beauty by allowing every ugly woman to become beautiful."
