= Sonnet 62 =

« » Sonnet 62
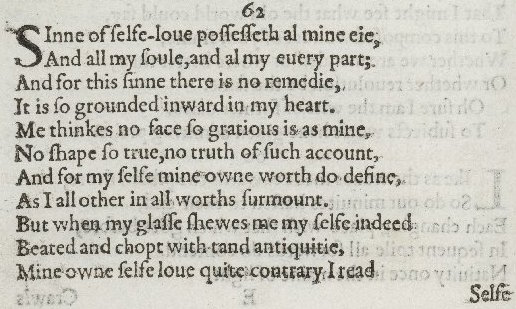
- The first eleven lines of Sonnet 62 in the 1609 Quarto
Q1
Q2
Q3
C
Sin of self-love possesseth all mine eye
And all my soul and all my every part;
And for this sin there is no remedy,
It is so grounded inward in my heart.
Methinks no face so gracious is as mine,
No shape so true, no truth of such account;
And for myself mine own worth do define,
As I all other in all worths surmount.
But when my glass shows me myself indeed,
Beated and chopp’d with tann’d antiquity,
Mine own self-love quite contrary I read;
Self so self-loving were iniquity.
’Tis thee, myself, that for myself I praise
Painting my age with beauty of thy days.
—William Shakespeare
4
8
12
14

Sonnet 62 is one of 154 sonnets written by the English playwright and poet William Shakespeare. It is a member of the Fair Youth sequence, addressed to the young man with whom Shakespeare shares an intimate but tormented connection. This sonnet brings together a number of themes that run through the cycle: the speaker's awareness of social and other differences between him and the beloved; the power and limitations of poetic art; and the puzzling sense in which love erases the boundaries between individuals.

== Structure ==
Sonnet 62 is an English or Shakespearean sonnet, with three quatrains followed by a final rhyming couplet. It follows the form's typical rhyme scheme, ABAB CDCD EFEF GG, and is composed in a type of poetic metre known as iambic pentameter based on five pairs of metrically weak/strong syllabic positions. The sixth line exemplifies a regular iambic pentameter:

 ×   /    ×   /    ×   /   ×   /   ×  / 
No shape so true, no truth of such account, (62.6)

/ = ictus, a metrically strong syllabic position. × = nonictus.

The first line (as do some others) has an initial reversal:

 /  ×   ×    /    ×  /  ×   /    ×   / 
Sin of self-love possesseth all mine eye, (62.1)

Reversals can be used to bring special emphasis to words — especially action verbs, as in line ten's "beated" and line fourteen's "painting" — a practice Marina Tarlinskaja calls rhythmical italics.

== Source and analysis ==
The conceit of the poem is derived most nearly from Petrarch; however, the idea of lovers who have in some sense exchanged souls is commonplace and proverbial. The connected theme—the speaker's unworthiness compared to his beloved—is likewise traditional.

Line 7 has posed some problems. Edward Dowden hypothesized that "for myself" meant "for my own satisfaction," and certain editors suggest that "do" be amended to "so." Consensus, however, has settled on some version of the gloss of Nicolaus Delius: "I define my own worth for myself," with "do" as an intensifier.

For "beated" in line 10, Edmond Malone suggested "bated," and George Steevens "blasted." Dowden speculated, without accepting, the possibility that "beated" referred to a process of tanning; John Shakespeare was a glover. Stephen Booth notes that the use of "bating" in this sense is not attested before the nineteenth century.

Helen Vendler sees the speaker of the poem as harshly criticizing his own weakness and foolishness, but for most critics the poem is lighter in mood. Though it echoes other poems in the sequence which present the connections created by love as painful, in this poem, the presence of the beloved is comforting rather than terrifying.

== Interpretations ==
- John Sessions, for the 2002 compilation album, When Love Speaks (EMI Classics)
