= Sonnet 2 =

« » Sonnet 2
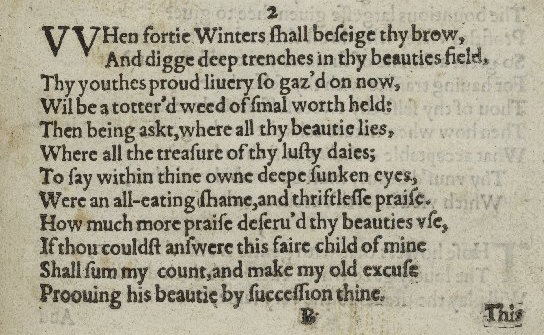
- The first twelves lines of Sonnet 2 in the 1609 Quarto
Q1
Q2
Q3
C
When forty winters shall besiege thy brow
And dig deep trenches in thy beauty’s field,
Thy youth’s proud livery, so gaz’d on now,
Will be a tatter’d weed, of small worth held:
Then being ask’d where all thy beauty lies,
Where all the treasure of thy lusty days,
To say, within thine own deep-sunken eyes,
Were an all-eating shame and thriftless praise.
How much more praise deserv’d thy beauty’s use,
If thou couldst answer “This fair child of mine
Shall sum my count and make my old excuse,”
Proving his beauty by succession thine!
This were to be new made when thou art old,
And see thy blood warm when thou feel’st it cold.
—William Shakespeare
4
8
12
14

Sonnet 2 is one of 154 sonnets written by the English playwright and poet William Shakespeare. It is a procreation sonnet within the Fair Youth sequence.

== Structure ==
Sonnet 2 is an English or Shakespearean sonnet, which consists of three quatrains followed by a couplet. It follows the form's typical rhyme scheme: ABAB CDCD EFEF GG. Like all but one sonnet in the sequence, it is written in iambic pentameter, a type of poetic metre based on five pairs of metrically weak/strong syllabic positions:

 ×   /    ×     /     × /       ×  /   ×   / 
How much more praise deserved thy beauty's use, (2.9)

/ = ictus, a metrically strong syllabic position. × = nonictus.

== Analysis ==
Shakespeare's Sonnet 2 is the second procreation sonnet. Shakespeare looks ahead to the time when the youth will have aged, and uses this as an argument to urge him to waste no time. It urges the young man to have a child and thereby protect himself from reproach by preserving his beauty against Time's destruction.

Sonnet 2 begins with a military siege metaphor, something that occurs often in sonnets and poetry –from Virgil (‘he ploughs the brow with furrows’) and Ovid (‘furrows which may plough your body will come already’) to Shakespeare's contemporary, Drayton, “The time-plow’d furrows in thy fairest field.” The image is used here as a metaphor for a wrinkled brow. Trenches are also carved into a field when a farmer plows, and the agricultural connotation is touched on two lines later with the image of worthless weeds.

Livery is usually a uniform for a butler or soldier, which may suggest that the young man's beauty does not belong to him.

In the second quatrain, it points out that when the young man is old and asked where his beauty went, and he must then answer that his treasure is found only in his own self-absorbed “deep sunken” eyes, it would be a shame.

The third quatrain suggests that this waste and shame could be avoided if the young man were to have a child who could inherit his beauty.

== Interpretations ==
- Caroline Blakiston, for the 2002 compilation album, When Love Speaks (EMI Classics)
