= Sonnet 21 =

Poem by William Shakespeare

« » Sonnet 21
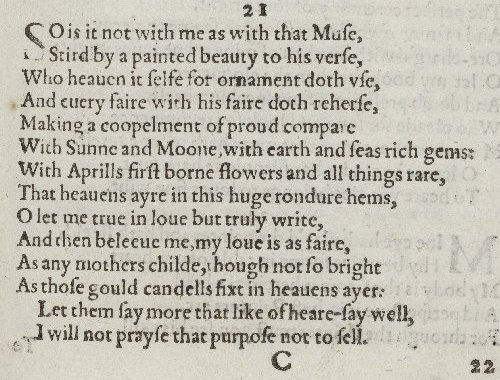
- Sonnet 21 in the 1609 Quarto
Q1
Q2
Q3
C
So is it not with me as with that Muse
Stirr’d by a painted beauty to his verse,
Who heaven itself for ornament doth use
And every fair with his fair doth rehearse,
Making a couplement of proud compare,
With sun and moon, with earth and sea’s rich gems,
With April’s first-born flowers, and all things rare
That heaven’s air in this huge rondure hems.
O, let me, true in love, but truly write,
And then believe me, my love is as fair
As any mother’s child, though not so bright
As those gold candles fix’d in heaven’s air:
Let them say more that like of hearsay well;
I will not praise that purpose not to sell.
—William Shakespeare
4
8
12
14

Sonnet 21 is one of 154 sonnets written by the English playwright and poet William Shakespeare and is part of the Fair Youth sequence. Like Sonnet 130, it addresses the issue of truth in love, as the speaker asserts that his lines, while less extravagant than those of other poets, are more truthful. Contrary to most of Shakespeare's sonnets, Sonnet 21 is not addressed to any one person. There is no second person, no overt "you" or "thou" expressed in it.

== Structure ==
Sonnet 21 is a typical English or Shakespearean sonnet. It consists of three quatrains followed by a couplet, nominally rhyming abab cdcd efef gg — though this poem has six rhymes instead of seven because of the common sound used in rhymes c and f in the second and third quatrains: "compare", "rare", "fair", and "air".

The sixth line exemplifies a regular iambic pentameter:

 ×    /  ×    /     ×   /     ×    /     ×    / 
With sun and moon, with earth and sea's rich gems, (21.6)

/ = ictus, a metrically strong syllabic position. × = nonictus.

A reader's sense of meter usually arises chiefly from stresses inherent in the text. Line ten provides a case in which the reader's sense of meter must condition the accents applied to the text. Without the benefit of reading ahead to the eleventh line, a neutral prose reading of second half of line 10 would observe stresses on the words "love" and "fair". However this does not produce a well-formed pentameter line. A sensitive reader will place an accent on "my" which in turn will allow ictuses to rest on "my" and "is", producing the well-formed iambic pentameter scanned below, even before the textual reason for the contrastive accent on "my" (as compared to "any mother's") is understood:

×     /   × /     ×   /  ×   /  ×   / 
And then believe me: my love is as fair (21.10)

== Synopsis and analysis ==
George Wyndham calls this the first sonnet to address the problem of the rival poet; Beeching and others, however, differentiate the poet mentioned here from the one later seen competing with Shakespeare's speaker for the affections of a male beloved. Larsen asserts that the "Muse", to which the poet takes exception here and whom through "compare" he parodies to make his own point, differs from the tenth "Muse" of Sonnet 38, although the two sonnets share vocabulary, rhyme and the theme of praise.

Shakespeare's opening disclaimer asserts that his Muse is not like some other Muse that is "Stirred by a painted beauty to his verse". To "stir", as well as meaning to excite passion like a Muse, connects with "painted" since paint is stirred. Shakespeare derides the "vain" sonneteer who searches for images even from the heavens to "ornament" his comparison and who will "rehearse" or 'describe at length' his "fair" by comparison with every other "fair" to make a "couplement", either a coupling in a comparison or a couplet or stanza. The repetition of "fair" echoes Sonnet 18's "And every fair from fair some time declines".

Shakespeare will resist their practice of "proud compare" to the sun, moon, the "rich gems" of earth and sea, and "April's first-born flowers", both 'born' and 'borne'. He will disregard "all things rare" that are contained within the bounds of the universe ("hems"), which another poet's pen might use. The line echoes the conclusion of another poem in the sequence, Sonnet 130's "And yet by heaven I think my love as rare, / As any she belied with false compare."

This poet is different and plain speaking. Because he is "true in love", he will "truly write" and require of the youth" (or reader) that he "believe" him: "my love is as fair / As any mother's child", the last allusion in the sequence to the youth to beget an 'heir' (intimated in the pun on air and heir at the end of line 12). The "gold candles" are the stars in the heavens. Edmond Malone found parallel descriptions of the stars as candles in Romeo and Juliet and Macbeth.

While Alexander Schmidt glosses line 13 as "fall in love with what others have praised," Edward Dowden has it "those who like to be buzzed about by talk." As William James Rolfe notes, the line, and indeed the final couplet, refer definitely to the type of exaggerated praise that Shakespeare declaims in the sonnet. George Wyndham notes a parallel to the final line in Samuel Daniel's "Delia 53"; in that poem, the speaker condemns the "mercenary lines" of other poets. As Madeleine Doran and others note, criticism of exaggerated praise was only slightly less common in Renaissance poetry than such praise itself.

== Interpretations ==
- Imogen Stubbs, for the 2002 compilation album, When Love Speaks (EMI Classics)
