= Sonnet 60 =

« » Sonnet 60
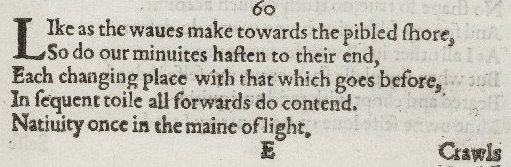
- The first five lines of Sonnet 60 in the 1609 Quarto
Q1
Q2
Q3
C
Like as the waves make towards the pebbled shore,
So do our minutes hasten to their end;
Each changing place with that which goes before,
In sequent toil all forwards do contend.
Nativity, once in the main of light,
Crawls to maturity, wherewith being crown’d,
Crooked eclipses ’gainst his glory fight,
And Time that gave doth now his gift confound.
Time doth transfix the flourish set on youth
And delves the parallels in beauty’s brow,
Feeds on the rarities of nature’s truth,
And nothing stands but for his scythe to mow:
And yet to times in hope my verse shall stand,
Praising thy worth, despite his cruel hand.
—William Shakespeare
4
8
12
14

Sonnet 60 is one of 154 sonnets written by the English playwright and poet William Shakespeare. It is a member of the Fair Youth sequence, in which the poet expresses his love towards a young beloved.

== Synopsis ==
Sonnet 60 focuses upon the theme of the passing of time. This is one of the major themes of Shakespeare's sonnets, which can be seen in Sonnet 1 as well. Like sonnets 1-126, Sonnet 60 is addressed to "a fair youth" whose identity is debated. In the last two lines (the couplet) the speaker says that his verse will live on and therefore make the beauty of the beloved immortal.

The sonnet compares minutes to waves on a pebbled shore regularly replacing each other. Time is also depicted as a gift giver and also as a gift destroyer.

== Form and structure ==
Sonnet 60 is an English or Shakespearean sonnet. The Shakespearean sonnet contains three quatrains followed by a final rhyming couplet. It follows the form's typical rhyme, abab cdcd efef gg and is written a type of poetic metre called iambic pentameter based on five pairs of metrically weak/strong syllabic positions. The thirteenth line exemplifies a regular iambic pentameter:

×    /   ×  /    ×   /    ×  /      ×     / 
And yet to times in hope my verse shall stand, (60.13)

/ = ictus, a metrically strong syllabic position. × = nonictus.

Helen Vendler calls Sonnet 60 "one of the perfect examples of the 4-4-4-2 Shakespearean sonnet form". According to Vendler, "Each quatrain introduces a new and important modification in concept and tone, while the couplet—here a "reversing" couplet contradicting the body of the sonnet—adds yet a fourth dimension". In other words, Vendler is arguing that each section of the poem offers new insight and content; therefore, there are four distinct parts or "dimensions" of the sonnet—each quatrain is not merely expressing the same idea, while the couplet is not simply summarizing the quatrains.

Sonnet 60 incorporates a large number of trochees, feet with a metrically strong followed by a metrically weak syllabic position (/ ×) in place of an iamb (× /). Vendler writes that the first two lines of the sonnet begin with trochees, which "draw attention to the hastening of the waves, the attacks by eclipses and by Time, and the countervailing praising by verse". According to Robert Arbour, after these initial trochees, Shakespeare ends each of these first two lines with a "calm, iambic meter". Arbour argues that this sensation of waves crashing culminates at the beginning of the third line, in which a spondee, a foot with two stressed syllables, represents this climax. However, Carl Atkins claims that the first two lines are "answered directly by two regular lines". Despite this disagreement, both critics acknowledge that the non-iambic feet simulate the undulating and crashing waves that Shakespeare portrays in the first line of the sonnet. While Vendler emphasizes the meter of the first quatrain, Atkins and Arbour continue this analysis by examining the second quatrain. After the first quatrain, the next trochee occurs in the middle of line 5, the only medial trochee of the sonnet, followed by trochees at the beginning of the sixth and seventh lines. The sixth and seventh lines mirror the first two lines of the sonnet in form, drawing attention to their common theme of birth—the waves near the shore and children grow toward maturity—and death—minutes reach their conclusion as the children's glory is destroyed. The non-linear pattern of the second quatrain also draws attention to the quatrain's "slowness and repeated breaks [which suggest] the labour of human life which Time hinders at every step". This contrasts greatly with the "smoothness of the first quatrain, describing the work of time, in which each line [after the initial trochee] runs to its end like the ripple to which it compares the succession of minutes". Therefore, while these three critics may examine and emphasize different aspects of the meter in the sonnet, all three maintain that the meter helps convey and facilitate the main themes of the sonnet.

== Analysis and criticism ==
This poem has many competing images, including time, conflict, and the sea. In Stephen Booth's thorough criticism of Sonnet 60, he remarks that of the battle that the speaker attempts to wage against time in his effort to be together with the youth. The words chosen by Shakespeare such as toil, transfix, fight, contend, glory, confound, and scythe all hint at a violent conflict to which the speaker finds himself irreversibly attached. The conflict of the speaker relates to how best to solve the problem of time, yet he initially sees no counter to time's devastating attacks.

Lopez dives into more detail about this conflict, focusing on the death and destruction that Sonnet 60 describes The second quatrain explains life's cycle, presenting the journey from birth to death and from sunrise to eclipse or sunset as ways to explicate the feeling of loss after having so much. It culminates in the pessimism that all that was ever had, has been or will be lost. He explains the third quatrain as the degradation of his fascination's beauty, that the weapons that time methodically uses to slowly strip what the speaker values is a crushing blow. The completeness of time's destruction is made clear as if man's beauty and goodness are created only for time to demolish.

Helen Vendler sees the conflict that both Booth and Lopez are picking up on, but also adds the idea of the different concepts of time that Shakespeare develops. The waves upon the shore, beating endlessly as the minutes beat upon the hours, is the stationary model, showing the consistency and terminality of the speaker's enemy. She also describes a model of rise and fall, characterizing the tragic model. Similar to the shape of a human lifespan, with a rise from immaturity and incompetence, climaxing at a stage most able, and then steadily falling away from the high point of life and towards entropy, the second quatrain shows this parabolic idea of existence, from which Shakespeare longs to escape. The third quatrain gives Vendler the specific images that Booth and Lopez refer to the violent encounter between the speaker and time, and how time speedily spoils all the speaker enjoys. While Booth and Lopez see the conflict Shakespeare is ensnared by as one of the main points to take away from this sonnet, Vendler examines the confusion of these models interacting with each other, suggesting an inner conflict as more pressing than his external conflict about time and its destructive and unwanted powers.

== Context ==
Sonnet 60 appears as part of a larger collection of 154 sonnets published in 1609 under the title "Shakespeare's Sonnets". Sonnets 1-126, or the "Fair Youth" sequence, are commonly thought to be addressed to a young man, though that man's identity is not known. It is believed that the majority of the sonnets were written in the 1590s, including Sonnet 60 (xxix). The historical context in which Shakespeare wrote Sonnet 60, especially matters concerning time, provide an interpretive key to the poem. By the 1590s, when Shakespeare wrote Sonnet 60, England was in the midst of a period of unprecedented colonization, industry, and commerce. Charles Andrews points out in his History of England that in the era of Elizabeth, England entered its period of "modern history" and had "become a power of first rank". The Spanish Armada had been defeated in 1588. At the same time, coinage became standardized. The English East India Company launched its first spice trading expedition in 1598, and England began its first colonization attempts in North America. In commerce, industry and wealth, England experienced unprecedented growth and all of these areas were, by the 1590s, all "regulated and controlled by the state". As England became more powerful and regulated, the accurate measurement of time became crucial to the country's well-being. The accurate measurement of time helped in standardizing the payment of wages for labor, regulating industry, and keeping governance efficient. By the 16th century "life in the cities had become equated with life by the clock", and by the late 16th century, the first minute hands began to appear on public (and private) clocks. Time in the London of 1609 had become highly measured, increasingly accurate, and integrated into the social order; people "ruled themselves by the clock". Dympna Callaghan in the essay, "Confounded by Winter, Speeding Time in Shakespeare's Sonnets", states that Sonnet 60 is one of two sonnets (also 12) which are "keenly concerned with time" and are given the "significantly symbolic numbers". Sonnet 12 concerns the 12 hours on the face of a clock and Sonnet 60 concerns "our minutes". These two sonnets, therefore, Callaghan says, "bespeak mechanical time" and their number signifies the importance of the modern measurement of time. This "measured" and "mechanical" time-keeping changed the way persons experienced time. Time in the ancient world had been marked by the rising of the sun and its setting, the seasons, or the lunar and solar events, by birth and death. With the coming of modern measurements of time, Daniel Boorstin in The Discoverers states that "mankind [was] liberated from the monotony of nature" and "[t]he flow of shadows, sand and water translated into the clock's staccato, became a useful measure of man's movement across the planet" (1). With the increasing dominance of mechanical time in the 1590s—the context of Shakespeare's Sonnet 60—the connection between nature and time began to fracture.

== The influence of Ovid: Metamorphoses and Sonnet 60 ==
Sections of Book XV of Ovid's Metamorphoses serve as the template for much of Sonnet 60. As in Shakespeare's Sonnet 60, Ovid speaks of time as a cyclical, natural process, like waves on the sea:

Ovid

Full sail, I voyage
Over the boundless ocean, and I tell you
Nothing is permanent in all the world.
All things are fluent; every image forms,
Wandering through change. Time is itself a river
In constant movement, and the hours flow by
Like water, wave on wave, pursued and pursuing,
Forever fugitive, forever new

Shakespeare

Like as the waves make towards the pebbled shore
So do our minutes hasten to their end;
Each changing place with that which goes before
In sequent toil all forwards do contend.

Ovid, as in Shakespeare's sonnet, speaks of this same natural rhythm of time as seen through the process of birth, life and death:

Ovid

To the void air, there in light we lay
Feeble and infant and were quadrupeds
Before too long a little wobbled
And pulled ourselves upright, holding a chair,
And the side of the crib and strength grew into us
And swiftness; youth and middle age went swiftly.

Shakespeare

Nativity once in the main of light
Crawls to maturity wherewith being crown'd
Crooked eclipses 'gainst his glory fight
And time that gave doth now his gift confound

Ovid closes this section, like Shakespeare, depicting Time as a devouring animal. Ovid writes:

Ovid

….Time devours all things
With envious age together. The slow gnawing
Consumes all things, and very, very slowly.

Shakespeare

Time doth transfix the flourish set on youth
And delves the parallels in beauty's brow
Feeds on the rarities of nature's truth
And nothing stands but for his scythe to mow

According to Jonathan Bate, Shakespeare relied heavily on these sections of Ovid's Metamorphoses while composing Sonnet 60, and these passages from Ovid roughly correspond to the three quatrains of the sonnet. Shakespeare would have looked back to ancient sources like many Renaissance writers of his time. In the book Shakespeare and Ovid, Jonathan Bate states that persons of the Renaissance period "believed passionately that the present could learn from the past" and that this belief "was the starting-point of education and a formative influence on the writing of the period". There was a strong belief in Shakespeare's day that, though times change—changes which are the result of the passing of time—the essentials of human nature, "the foundations of the affections of the human mind," did not change. To look into the past, therefore, meant also for Shakespeare to look more deeply into the meaning of the present. By looking back to Book XV of Ovid's Metamorphoses, Shakespeare also gives a modern view (one that includes minutes) of an ancient view of time, one that provides a contrast to the more mechanized time of the 1590s. Time, in Ovid's work and in the first three quatrains of Sonnet 60, is intertwined with the processes of nature, looking back to a time before time and nature were fractured. Just as the poem struggles with time, so Shakespeare's modernized use of Ovid struggles to reconcile the past view of time and the present view of time, the world as it was, and the world as it is.

== Recordings ==
- Richard Wilson, for the 2002 compilation album, When Love Speaks (EMI Classics)
- Paul Kelly, for the 2016 album, Seven Sonnets & a Song
