= Sonnet 3 =

« » Sonnet 3
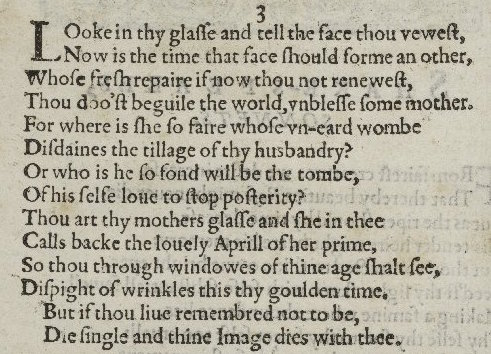
- Sonnet 3 in the 1609 Quarto
Q1
Q2
Q3
C
Look in thy glass, and tell the face thou viewest
Now is the time that face should form another;
Whose fresh repair if now thou not renewest,
Thou dost beguile the world, unbless some mother.
For where is she so fair whose unear’d womb
Disdains the tillage of thy husbandry?
Or who is he so fond will be the tomb,
Of his self-love, to stop posterity?
Thou art thy mother’s glass, and she in thee
Calls back the lovely April of her prime:
So thou through windows of thine age shall see,
Despite of wrinkles, this thy golden time.
But if thou live, remember’d not to be,
Die single, and thine image dies with thee.
—William Shakespeare
4
8
12
14

Sonnet 3 is one of 154 sonnets written by the English playwright and poet William Shakespeare. It is often referred to as a procreation sonnet that falls within the Fair Youth sequence.

In the sonnet, the speaker is urging the man being addressed to preserve something of himself and something of the image he sees in the mirror by fathering a child. The “young man” of this and other sonnets is a subject of debate. Some think it may be based on William Herbert, others consider Henry Wriothesley. There are other candidates as well.

== Structure ==
The poem takes the form of a Shakespearean sonnet: fourteen decasyllabic, iambic pentameter lines, that form three quatrains and a concluding rhyming couplet. It follows the form's rhyme scheme: ABAB CDCD EFEF GG. Each line of the first quatrain of Sonnet 3 exhibits a final extrametrical syllable or feminine ending. The first line additionally exhibits an initial reversal:

 /   ×    ×   /   ×    /     ×  /     ×   / (×)
Look in thy glass and tell the face thou viewest (3.1)

/ = ictus, a metrically strong syllabic position. × = nonictus. (×) = extrametrical syllable.

== Analysis ==
In this sonnet, the poet is urging the 'fair youth' to preserve something of himself and something of the image he sees in the mirror by fathering a child, "Now is the time that face should form another".

The message is reiterated in the last lines of the poem: "But if thou live, remember'd not to be, / Die single, and thine image dies with thee." Not only will the youth die, but so will his image — the one in his mirror, and also his image that may be seen borne by his yet-to-be child.
