= Sonnet 54 =

« » Sonnet 54
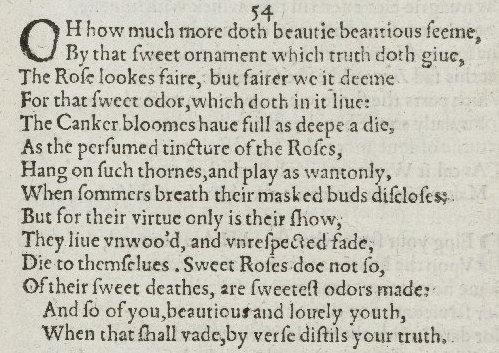
- Sonnet 54 in the 1609 Quarto
Q1
Q2
Q3
C
O how much more doth beauty beauteous seem
By that sweet ornament which truth doth give!
The rose looks fair, but fairer we it deem
For that sweet odour which doth in it live;
The canker blooms have full as deep a dye
As the perfumed tincture of the roses,
Hang on such thorns, and play as wantonly
When summer’s breath their masked buds discloses;
But for their virtue only is their show
They live unwoo’d, and unrespected fade,
Die to themselves. Sweet roses do not so;
Of their sweet deaths are sweetest odours made;
And so of you, beauteous and lovely youth;
When that shall vade, by verse distills your truth.
—William Shakespeare
4
8
12
14

Sonnet 54 is one of 154 sonnets published in 1609 by the English playwright and poet William Shakespeare. It is considered one of the Fair Youth sequence. This sonnet is a continuation of the theme of inner substance versus outward show by noting the distinction between roses and canker blooms; only roses can preserve their inner essence by being distilled into perfume. The young man's essence or substance can be preserved by verse.

== Structure ==
Sonnet 54 is an English or Shakespearean sonnet. The English sonnet contains three quatrains followed by a final rhyming couplet. This poem follows the rhyme scheme of the English sonnet, abab cdcd efef gg and is composed in iambic pentameter, a type of metre in which each line has five feet, and each foot has two syllables that are accented weak/strong. The fifth line exemplifies a regular iambic pentameter:

  ×  /  ×    /     ×    /   ×   /   ×  / 
The canker blooms have full as deep a dye

/ = ictus, a metrically strong syllabic position. × = nonictus. (×) = extrametrical syllable.

The sixth and eighth lines end with feminine endings.

== Synopsis ==
Sonnet 54 by William Shakespeare is divided into three quatrains and one heroic couplet. The first two quatrains work together, illustrating both the scentless canker bloom and the scented rose. In the first two lines of the first quatrain he says that beauty seems more beauteous as a result of truth. In the next two he gives the example of a rose. He says that beyond its looks, we prize the rose for its scent. This scent is its "truth" or essence. In the second quatrain Shakespeare compares the rose to the canker bloom. They have similar in ways other than scent. Shakespeare's use of the words "play" and "wantonly" together implies that "play" has a sexual connotation. In the third quatrain the author compares the death of the two flowers. The canker bloom dies alone and "unrespected", while roses do not die alone, for "of their sweet deaths are sweetest odours made". The final couplet indicates that the young man, or perhaps that which is beauteous and lovely, will enjoy a second life in verse, while that which is meaningless and shallow will be forgotten. This distillation metaphor can be compared to sonnet 5, where marriage was the distiller and beauty was distilled. In either sonnet one gets the same result from the distillation process, which is beauty. However, in sonnet 5 the distillation process is through marriage, and in sonnet 54 it is through verse. "Vade" in the final line is often used in a sense similar to "fade", but "vade" has stronger connotations of decay. In 1768, Edward Capell altered the final line by replacing the quarto's "by" with "my". This alteration was generally followed through the 19th Century. More recent editors do not favor this alteration, as it narrows the meaning from the larger principles of the sonnet.

== Roses ==
This poem is a comparison between two flowers that are representations of the youth's beauty. Shakespeare compares these flowers, which vary greatly in their appearance, although they are essentially the same kind of flower, the "canker-blooms" or wild roses, according to Katherine Duncan-Jones, are the less desirable then that of the, assumed, damask or crimson rose. Since the wild roses do not prolong their beauty after death, they are not like the youth–who even after death shall be immortalized in the writers words of the sonnet.

Duncan Jones adds: "There is an additional problem about Shakespeare's contrast between 'The rose' and 'The canker blooms'. It is strongly implied that the latter have no scent, and cannot be distilled into rose-water: for their virtue only is their show. 'They live unwooed, and unrespected fade, Die to them selves. Sweet roses do not so ...' Yet it is clear that some wild roses, especially the sweet briar or eglantine, had a sweet, though not powerful, fragrance, and could be culled for distillation and conservation when better, red, roses were not available: their 'virtues' were identical".

== Literary influences ==
In Sonnet 54's third line "The rose looks fair, but fairer we it deem,” we see a reference to Edmund Spenser's Amoretti, Sonnet 26, the first line of which is "Sweet is the rose, but growes upon a brere." This reference is just one of many which help to "proclaim Shakespeare's deepest literary values and his recurrent aesthetic convictions." While Shakespeare honors his contemporaries, one of the things that make Shakespeare great is how he differed from them. The Amoretti is a series of sonnets focused on a more traditional topic, the courting which led to Spencer's marriage. In the Amoretti, Spenser proposes "that a resolution to the sonneteer's conventional preoccupations with love may be found within the bounds of Christian marriage."

== Context in sonnet sequence ==
The context of the sonnets vary, but the first 126, amongst which sonnet 54 is found, are addressed to a young man of good social status and profess the narrator's platonic love. The love is returned, and the young man seems to yearn for the sonnets, as seen in sonnets 100-103 where the narrator apologizes for the long silence. However, Berryman suggests that it is impossible to determine how the relationship ended up. While theories exist that the sonnets were written as literary exercises, H. C. Beeching suggests that they were written for a patron and not originally intended to be published together.

== Sexuality ==
In an analysis of Margreta de Grazia's essay about Shakespeare's sonnets, Robert Matz, mentions the subject of Shakespeare's sonnets (such as Sonnet 54) being written to a man. Drawing on a Foucauldian history of sexuality, De Grazia and Matz argue that while this notion appears scandalous in modernity, in Shakespeare's time this was not the same kind of issue. Sonnets written to a woman could have been considered more improper in Shakespeare's era because of the possible class difference and the idea of a woman's presumed promiscuity (originating in the idea of Eve causing the fall of man by enticing Adam to eat the forbidden fruit). According to Matz, "contemporary categories of or judgments about sexual desire may not cohere with past ones. De Grazia usefully argues that the changing reception of the sonnets marks a shift from an early modern concern with sex as a social category to modern understanding of sex as a personal one". The notion of homosexuality versus heterosexuality is a modern development that simply did not exist in 16th century England. Readers may have disapproved of Shakespeare's same-sex love or male friendship before the mid-20th century but they would not have reacted to the text as Shakespeare presenting himself as a "homosexual". Rather they would have pointed to other sonnets to prove his heterosexuality, and therefore find consolation in that.
