= Sonnet 61 =

« » Sonnet 61
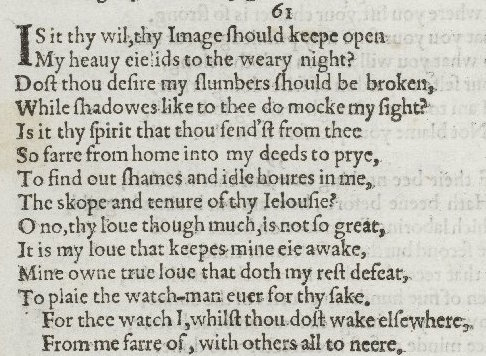
- Sonnet 61 in the 1609 Quarto
Q1
Q2
Q3
C
Is it thy will thy image should keep open
My heavy eyelids to the weary night?
Dost thou desire my slumbers should be broken,
While shadows like to thee do mock my sight?
Is it thy spirit that thou send’st from thee
So far from home into my deeds to pry,
To find out shames and idle hours in me,
The scope and tenor of thy jealousy?
O, no! thy love, though much, is not so great:
It is my love that keeps mine eye awake;
Mine own true love that doth my rest defeat,
To play the watchman ever for thy sake:
For thee watch I whilst thou dost wake elsewhere,
From me far off, with others all too near.
—William Shakespeare
4
8
12
14

Sonnet 61 is one of 154 sonnets written by the English playwright and poet William Shakespeare. It is a member of the Fair Youth sequence, in which the poet expresses his love towards a young man.

== Structure ==
Sonnet 61 is an English or Shakespearean sonnet, containing three quatrains followed by a final rhyming couplet. It follows the form's typical rhyme scheme, ABAB CDCD EFEF GG, and is composed in iambic pentameter, a type of poetic metre based on five pairs of metrically weak/strong syllabic positions. The seventh line exemplifies a regular iambic pentameter:

 ×  /   ×     /    ×   / ×   /    ×   / 
To find out shames and idle hours in me, (61.7)

The first and third lines have a final extrameterical syllable or feminine ending:

 ×     /   × /    ×   /  ×     /     ×   /(×) 
Dost thou desire my slumbers should be broken, (61.3)

/ = ictus, a metrically strong syllabic position. × = nonictus. (×) = extrametrical syllable.

Although many rhymes in the sonnets are imperfect in today's pronunciation, they were almost all perfect (or at least potentially so) in Shakespeare's day. The a rhymes, "open" and "broken" constitute a rare instance of an imperfect rhyme in the Sonnets, though the same rhyme occurs in Venus and Adonis lines 47 and 48.
