= Sonnet 9 =

« » Sonnet 9
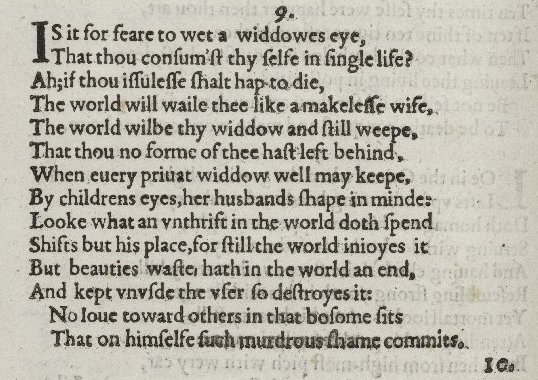
- Sonnet 9 in the 1609 Quarto
Q1
Q2
Q3
C
Is it for fear to wet a widow’s eye
That thou consum’st thyself in single life?
Ah! if thou issueless shalt hap to die.
The world will wail thee, like a makeless wife;
The world will be thy widow, and still weep
That thou no form of thee hast left behind,
When every private widow well may keep
By children’s eyes her husband’s shape in mind.
Look, what an unthrift in the world doth spend
Shifts but his place, for still the world enjoys it;
But beauty’s waste hath in the world an end,
And kept unus’d, the user so destroys it.
No love toward others in that bosom sits
That on himself such murderous shame commits.
—William Shakespeare
4
8
12
14

Sonnet 9 is one of 154 sonnets written by the English playwright and poet William Shakespeare. It is a procreation sonnet within the Fair Youth sequence.

Because Sonnet 10 pursues and amplifies the theme of "hatred against the world" which appears rather suddenly in the final couplet of this sonnet, one may well say that Sonnet 9 and Sonnet 10 form a diptych, even though the form of linkage is different from the case of Sonnets 5 and 6 or Sonnets 15 and 16.

== Structure ==
Sonnet 9 is an English or Shakespearean sonnet. Sonnets of this type comprise 14 lines, containing three quatrains and a final couplet, with the rhyme scheme ABAB CDCD EFEF GG. They are composed in iambic pentameter a metrical line based on five pairs of metrically weak/strong syllabic positions. Ambiguity can exist in the scansion of some lines. The weak words (lacking any tonic stress) beginning the poem allow the first line to be scanned as a regular pentameter:

×  /   ×   /    ×  /  ×  / ×    / 
Is it for fear to wet a widow's eye (9.1)

/ = ictus, a metrically strong syllabic position. × = nonictus.

...or as containing an initial reversal:

/  ×   ×   /    ×  /  ×  / ×    / 
Is it for fear to wet a widow's eye (9.1)

== Synopsis and analysis ==
Sonnet 9 argues again that the so-called "Fair Youth" should marry and father children. The poet first asks if the reason he has remained single was a "fear" that, if he were to die, he would leave some woman a widow and in tears ("to wet a widow's eye"). The poet also exclaims, "Ah," a musing and a sigh before the wailing to come. If the "Fair Youth" were to die without children, then the world would lament his absence as might a wife without a mate. The public world would be his widow and forever weep because he has left behind no figure of himself.

Shakespeare argues that the young man should at least leave his widow with child before he dies, and that at least a widow will always have the image of her children to console her after her loss. Shakespeare then talks in the language of economics, concluding that if beauty is not put to (procreative) use and is hoarded as if by a non-yielding, sexual miser ("kept unused"), he will destroy it. The sonnet ends with the scathing declaration that if the young man does not marry and have children, he is committing "murderous shame" upon himself. Since no outgoing "love" dwells in his "bosom", he is like Narcissus, guilty of self-love.
