= Sonnet 119 =

« » Sonnet 119
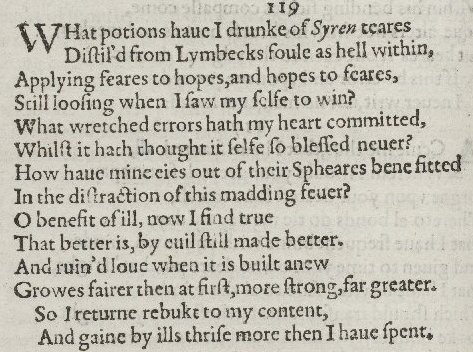
- Sonnet 119 in the 1609 Quarto
Q1
Q2
Q3
C
What potions have I drunk of Siren tears,
Distill’d from limbecks foul as hell within,
Applying fears to hopes and hopes to fears,
Still losing when I saw myself to win!
What wretched errors hath my heart committed,
Whilst it hath thought itself so blessed never!
How have mine eyes out of their spheres been fitted,
In the distraction of this madding fever!
O benefit of ill! now I find true
That better is by evil still made better;
And ruin’d love, when it is built anew,
Grows fairer than at first, more strong, far greater.
So I return rebuk’d to my content,
And gain by ill thrice more than I have spent.
—William Shakespeare
4
8
12
14

Sonnet 119 is one of 154 sonnets written by the English playwright and poet William Shakespeare. It's a member of the Fair Youth sequence, in which the poet expresses his love towards a young man.

== Structure ==
Sonnet 119 is an English or Shakespearean sonnet. The English sonnet has three quatrains, followed by a final rhyming couplet. It follows the typical rhyme scheme of the form ABAB CDCD EFEF GG and is composed in iambic pentameter, a type of poetic metre based on five pairs of metrically weak/strong syllabic positions. The 3rd line exemplifies a regular iambic pentameter:

×   /×    /     ×  /    ×    /     ×  / 
Applying fears to hopes and hopes to fears, (119.3)

An unusual number of lines (5, 6, 7, 8, 10, and 12) feature a final extrametrical syllable or feminine ending, as for example:

 /   ×    ×   /    /   ×    ×      /     ×    / (×) 
How have mine eyes out of their spheres been fitted, (119.7)

/ = ictus, a metrically strong syllabic position. × = nonictus. (×) = extrametrical syllable.

Line 7 (above) also features an initial reversal, and potentially a mid-line reversal. Other potential initial reversals occur in lines 6, 8, and 13, while potential mid-line reversals occur in lines 9 and 11.

The meter demands that line 6's "blessèd" is pronounced as two syllables.

== Interpretations ==
- Richard Hammond, for the 2002 compilation album, When Love Speaks (EMI)
