= Sonnet 8 =

« » Sonnet 8
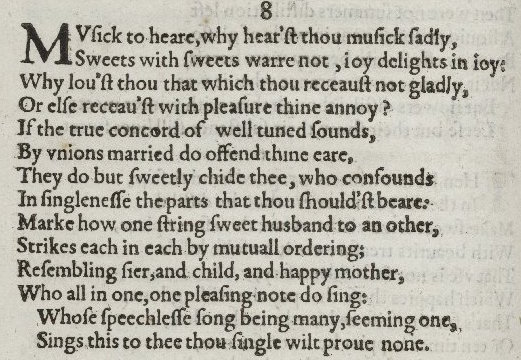
- Sonnet 8 in the 1609 Quarto
Q1
Q2
Q3
C
Music to hear, why hear’st thou music sadly?
Sweets with sweets war not, joy delights in joy.
Why lov’st thou that which thou receiv’st not gladly,
Or else receiv’st with pleasure thine annoy?
If the true concord of well-tuned sounds,
By unions married, do offend thine ear,
They do but sweetly chide thee, who confounds
In singleness the parts that thou shouldst bear.
Mark how one string, sweet husband to another,
Strikes each in each by mutual ordering;
Resembling sire and child and happy mother,
Who, all in one, one pleasing note do sing:
Whose speechless song, being many, seeming one,
Sings this to thee: “Thou single wilt prove none.”
—William Shakespeare
4
8
12
14

Sonnet 8 is one of 154 sonnets written by the English playwright and poet William Shakespeare. It is a procreation sonnet within the Fair Youth sequence. As with the other procreation sonnets, it urges a young man to settle down with a wife and to have children. It insists a family is the key to living a harmonious, peaceful life.

== Paraphrase ==
Sonnet 8 by William Shakespeare empathizes with the subject, who is against the idea of marriage. The young man, the subject of the sonnet, is chided for choosing to be single. The poet uses comparisons with music and marriage, likening the "true concord of well-tuned sounds" to a marriage. It is appropriate that Sonnet 8, a sonnet of musical descant, is placed as the 8th sonnet, since an "eight" is a "true concord." Sonnet 128, like Sonnet 8, suggests the octave of the scale as well as, in the case of 128 the 12 notes on the keyboard inside each octave (an association first recognized and described in detail by Fred Blick, in "Shakespeare's Musical Sonnets, Numbers 8, 128 and Pythagoras", 'The Upstart Crow, A Shakespeare Journal', Vol. XIX, (1999) 152–168.) Further, Blick notes that in Pythagorean musical theory the proportion of the octave is 1:2 and that on this basis the intervals between 8 and 128 i.e. 8–16, 16–32, 32–64, 64–128, span four octaves, the normal range of the keyboard of a virginal in Shakespeare's time." Shakespeare does this to emphasize the beauty and importance of having a family. The sonnet emphasizes the notion that the subject will not reach true harmony if he does not settle down with a wife and children. His life will be in discord if he chooses to continue being single. It is among the string of procreation sonnets written by Shakespeare. The procreation sonnets are sonnets 1–17. All share the theme of urging a young man to marry and have children, insisting they are key to a harmonious life.

In line 6, "Unions" can have two different meanings: that which is blatant to marriage and the other referring to harmonies. The Oxford English Dictionary does not give this as a definition, but the closeness of union to unison keeps the musical connotation present in the reader's mind. Then in line 8, "the parts that thou shouldst bear" still keeps the idea that music and family are one by saying a part that is played in the family, or with a musical instrument in an orchestra. "resembling sire and child and happy mother" in line 11 alludes to the Holy Family, Mary, Jesus, and Joseph as they were depicted as a happy family in multiple church paintings during the time this sonnet was written. The poet warns the subject against staying single in the last line, "‘Thou single wilt prove none.’" As a single person, a man will accomplish nothing.

== Context ==
Sonnet 8, published in the 1609 Quarto, is part of the Fair Youth sequence (sonnets 1–126), which makes up the largest portion of Shakespeare’s sonnets (see the Rival Poet sequence).

The Fair Youth sonnets center around one subject, who is a young, fair man. There is debate as to whom the subject is. Some theorize the sonnets are written about William Herbert, Earl of Pembroke. Henry Wriothesley, Earl of Southampton, has also been suggested as the fair youth. The first 17 sonnets (including Sonnet 8) urge the young man to marry and have children. The rest of the sonnets in the sequence seek to immortalize the fair youth within the poet's words.

== Structure ==
Sonnet 8 follows standard English or Shakespearean sonnet form, with 14 lines of iambic pentameter sectioned into three quatrains and a couplet, with the rhyme scheme ABAB CDCD EFEF GG. The iambic pentameter's metrical structure is based on five pairs of metrically weak/strong syllabic positions per line (as exemplified in the fourth line):

×  /     × /       ×     /  ×     /   ×  / 
Or else receiv'st with pleasure thine annoy? (8.4)

/ = ictus, a metrically strong syllabic position. × = nonictus. (×) = extrametrical syllable.

The first line features two common variations, an initial reversal and a final extrametrical syllable or feminine ending:

 / ×   ×  /      ×  /        ×   / ×   / (×) 
Music to hear, why hear'st thou music sadly? (8.1)

== Exegesis ==
In line 3, "Why lov'st thou" means "why do you like". It is followed by "thou receiv'st" which activates a sexual tone, emphasized by "receiv'st with pleasure" in line 4. The subject of the poem is having affairs; running around receiving pleasures, but with no intention of settling down. Yet "thine annoy" means what gives one pain, indicates the subject is unhappy with his situation.

There are some theories which indicate a homosexual relationship between the poet and the Fair Youth. These theorists argue that the use of affectionate word choice by the poet towards the young man must be due to a homosexual desire. Some suggest this theory is invalid, saying the poet views the Fair Youth as a son rather than a lover. Majority tend to lean towards the idea of a homosexual relationship due to choice of wording in some sonnets (see Sonnet 20).

During the era in which Shakespeare's sonnets were written, any "sexual acts that do not result in reproduction" were condemned. In David Hawkes's article, 'Sodomy, Usury, and the Narrative of Shakespeare's Sonnets', he "argues that by using the language of 'unnatural' usury to expound the merits of 'natural' marriage and procreation, Shakespeare is ironically undermining the assumption that, because homosexual sex is non-reproductive, homoerotic desire is 'unnatural'."
