= Sonnet 74 =

« » Sonnet 74
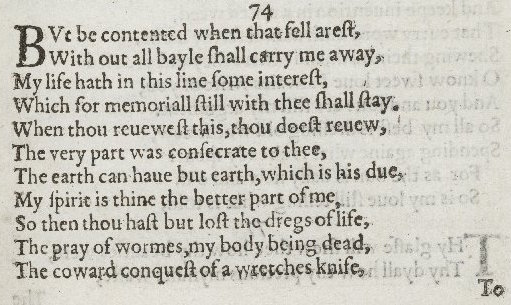
- The first eleven lines of Sonnet 74 in the 1609 Quarto
Q1
Q2
Q3
C
But be contented when that fell arrest
Without all bail shall carry me away;
My life hath in this line some interest,
Which for memorial still with thee shall stay.
When thou reviewest this, thou dost review
The very part was consecrate to thee;
The earth can have but earth, which is his due,
My spirit is thine, the better part of me;
So then thou hast but lost the dregs of life,
The prey of worms, my body being dead,
The coward conquest of a wretch’s knife,
Too base of thee to be remembered;
The worth of that, is that which it contains,
And that is this, and this with thee remains.
—William Shakespeare
4
8
12
14

Sonnet 74 is one of 154 sonnets published by the English playwright and poet William Shakespeare in 1609. It is one of the Fair Youth sequence.

== Synopsis ==
This sonnet takes back the urging that occurs in Sonnet 71, that the young man should forget the author. Instead, this sonnet encourages the youth to keep the better part of the poet, which is in his verse, and which will outlive the poet. There is a sense in this poem that the young man is like one who will potentially inherit something of value, and is at the bedside of a dying rich relation, and is considering in a legalistic manner what that value will be – once the dead body has been carried away and dumped in the earth as food for worms. The young man will inherit the best part of the poet – his spirit in the form of this sonnet.

== Structure ==
Sonnet 74 is an English or Shakespearean sonnet, which contains three quatrains, followed by a final rhyming couplet. It follows the rhyme scheme ABAB CDCD EFEF GG, and is composed in iambic pentameter, a poetic metre in which each line has five feet, and each foot is a pair of weak/strong syllables. The tenth line exemplifies a regular iambic pentameter line:

  ×   /  ×    /     ×  / ×  / ×    / 
The prey of worms, my body being dead; (74.10)

/ = ictus, a metrically strong syllabic position. × = nonictus.

The meter demands a few variant pronunciations: line 4's "memorial" counts as 3 syllables, line 8's "spirit" counts as 1 (possibly pronounced as spear't, sprite, sprit, or spurt), and line 12's "rememberèd" is expanded to 4.

== Possible allusion to St. Anne Line ==
Some scholars feel Sonnet 74 alludes to Catholic Saint Anne Line and her martyrdom at the time of Reformation. Along with the sonnet, the Shakespeare poem "The Phoenix and the Turtle" and the play The Tempest are also cited as alluding to St. Anne.
