= Sonnet 102 =

« » Sonnet 102
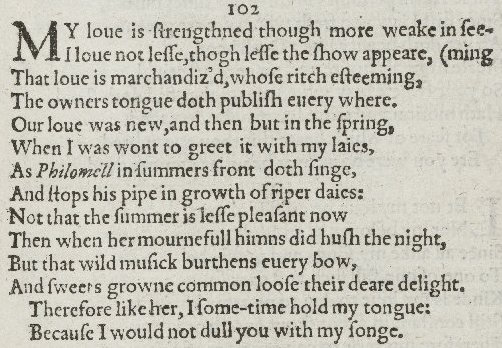
- Sonnet 102 in the 1609 Quarto of Shakespeare's sonnets
Q1
Q2
Q3
C
My love is strengthen’d, though more weak in seeming;
I love not less, though less the show appear:
That love is merchandiz’d whose rich esteeming
The owner’s tongue doth publish every where.
Our love was new, and then but in the spring,
When I was wont to greet it with my lays;
As Philomel in summer’s front doth sing,
And stops her pipe in growth of riper days:
Not that the summer is less pleasant now
Than when her mournful hymns did hush the night,
But that wild music burthens every bough,
And sweets grown common lose their dear delight.
Therefore, like her, I sometime hold my tongue,
Because I would not dull you with my song.
—William Shakespeare
4
8
12
14

Sonnet 102 is one of the 154 sonnets written by English playwright and poet William Shakespeare. It is one of the Fair Youth sonnets, in which Shakespeare writes of an unnamed youth with whom the poet is enamored. Sonnet 102 is among a series of seemingly connected sonnets, from Sonnet 100 to Sonnet 103, in which the poet speaks of a silence between his Muse and himself. The exact date of writing is unknown, and there is contention among scholars about when they were written. Paul Hammond among other scholars believes that sonnets 61-103 were written primarily during the early 1590s, and then being edited or added to later, during the early 1600s (decade). Regardless of date of writing, it was published later along with the rest of the sonnets of the 1609 Quarto.

In the sonnet, the poet writes of why he has stopped showering his muse with flowery praise and adoration. In his analysis of Shakespeare's Sonnets, David West suggests that the sequence of sonnets 100-103 and the silence described are a response to the infidelity of the Fair Youth in the Rival Poet sequence of sonnets (78–86), which has caused a rift between the poet and his Muse. He writes of how immediately following the Rival Poet sonnets, the Poet begins to speak of his lover being false and having forsaken him. West claims that this ultimately culminates in sonnets 100–103, where the Poet expresses his regret over what has transpired.

== Paraphrase ==
In this sonnet, the speaker is explaining that though he has been writing poetry in adoration of his muse less frequently, his feelings for him are as strong as they've ever been. Gwynne Blakemore Evans believes that this is an attempt to apologize for a period of silence. The poet goes on to explain that his silence is simply him not wanting to cheapen his praise by making it common. Below is a paraphrase of the sonnet written in prose:

My love is stronger than it's ever been, even though my love may seem to have diminished. I do not love less, even though I don't show it as much. Love becomes a commodity when it's spoken of too highly and too frequently. I used to sing my praises very frequently when our love was new, like the nightingale which sings in the summer and stops at summers end. It's not that the summer is less pleasant for the nightingale, it's simply that the songs of other birds fill the air, and when things become common, they become less dear. It's for this reason, I, like the nightingale, have stopped writing. I do not wish my poems to become boring.

== Structure ==
Sonnet 102 is an English or Shakespearean sonnet. The English sonnet has three quatrains, followed by a final rhyming couplet. It follows the typical rhyme scheme of the form abab cdcd efef gg and is composed in iambic pentameter, a type of poetic metre based on five pairs of metrically weak/strong syllabic positions. The 8th line exemplifies a regular iambic pentameter:

×     /    ×   /   ×    /    ×   / ×   / 
And stops her pipe in growth of riper days. (102.8)

The 1st and 3rd lines have a final extrametrical syllable or feminine ending:

 ×  /   ×     /    ×       /     ×    /   ×   / (×) 
My love is strengthened, though more weak in seeming; (102.1)

/ = ictus, a metrically strong syllabic position. × = nonictus. (×) = extrametrical syllable.

== Context ==
Sonnet 102 is a part of the Fair Youth sequence, and it is also connected with the surrounding sonnets (100, 101, and 103) in detailing a silence that has arisen between the poet and his muse. David West contends that this sequence may be in response to the Rival Poet sequence. The Rival Poet sequence of sonnets mention a rival for either the affections of the Fair Youth, or that they are addressing other writers that may be a "worthier pen" (Sonnet 79). There is a rather long list of people that scholars believe are likely candidates for the title of the fair youth addressed in the Sonnets: William Herbert, Earl of Pembroke; Philip Herbert, Earl of Montgomery; and Henry Wriothesley, Third Earl of Southampton are the most common candidates.

There has also been speculation of the identity of the Rival Poet. George Chapman and Christopher Marlowe, are typically considered to be the two most likely rivals, due to their publicity, profession, relations, and standing with Shakespeare during the presumed time of writing.

== Exegesis ==
=== Overview ===
While there is no consensus as to what specifically has caused the silence that has grown between the speaker and his muse, sonnet 102 seems to be an attempt to mend the relationship by claiming that he still loves as strongly as he ever has. Katherine Duncan-Jones has given the following overview: "Still claiming to have fallen silent, the poet claims that he loves just as much, though he shows it less, for fear of wearisome repetition."

=== Quatrain 1 ===
In the first quatrain the poet describes that he has become quiet about the love he has for his muse, but this does not mean that his love is less. Rather, he claims that it is for the exact opposite reason. Carl Aitkins feels that the tone established here is like an tangential thought from Sonnet 100 and Sonnet 101. Publishing sonnets about his love have become a kind of currency. This is a use of a common proverb of the time: "He praises who wishes to sell." David West suggests that this may also be viewed as an attack at the Rival Poet, in an attempt to cheapen the Rival Poet's love.

=== Quatrain 2 ===
In the second quatrain, the poet elaborates upon his sentiments made in the first quatrain, comparing the present silence to the relationship when it was new. He uses seasonal imagery to set up his atmosphere, which he continues to use in line three, where we also encounter an allusion to the myth of Philomela, which can be a poetic name for the nightingale. In Ovid's Metamorphoses, the myth of Philomela involves Tereus, the King of Thrace, who kidnaps his wife's sister, Philomela, and then he rapes her and cuts out her tongue to silence her. There is contention among scholars as to whether Shakespeare actively utilizes the Philomela allusion, Stephen Booth contends that there is "no active reference to Philomela." This is to say that Stephen Booth feels that Shakespeare is not invoking Philomela for any reason beyond the poetic name for the nightingale. In A Moving Rhetoricke, however, Christina Luckyj contends that the Shakespeare views the Fair Youth's silence as a violation of the same magnitude as Tereus's rape of Philomela, and the cause of the poet's silence. Since his lover has betrayed him in favor of the Rival Poet, he chooses to silence himself.

On line 8, "His" is the word which appears in the original 1609 Quarto. Katherine Duncan-Jones has edited this to become "her," as many scholars think that "his" may be a misreading of the manuscript, which may have read "hir". This change is frequently made by editors, as Philomel is referred to as feminine throughout the rest of the sonnet. However, there are scholars who defend the use of "his". Stephen Booth simply contends that this is done to move away from the mythological allusion and focuses on the nightingale: It is the male nightingale that sings. While David West also offers a defense of the use of "his," his reasoning differs greatly from Booth. West contends that Shakespeare used his for a variety of reasons, among his reasons being to avoid " the embarrassment of comparing [his lover] to a female." Another reason defense put forth by West is a difference in language. In Elizabethan times, his was used as a neutral pronoun, often used where a modern writer would use "its".

=== Quatrain 3 ===
The third quatrain continues the metaphor of the nightingale and seasonal imagery to further stress that the poet's silence is not because their love is less pleasant. The nightingale is used as a metaphor to explain that just because he does not flatter the Fair Youth, does not mean that he loves less. As one scholar put it, "too much praise ceases to please". The poet explains his silence further in line 11, that the wild birds physically burden the tree branches as well as crowd the air with their songs. This may represent the myriad of love sonnets being published in attempt to flatter and please their muses. A similar interpretation of line 12 by Katherine Duncan-Jones is given, in which she claims that the poet is addressing the many circulating love sonnets as somewhat redundant, describes them as "pleasures which have become familiar are no longer intensely enjoyable". This is a usage of another common proverb; "Too much familiarity breeds contempt."

=== Couplet ===
The couplet summarizes the sonnet in two lines, "Therefore, like her, I sometime hold my tongue, because I would not dull you with my song". This is a clear statement from the poet vocalizing for the final time that he will not dull, bore, or represent his muse in a tedious way by creating a sonnet as exhausted and clichéd as his contemporaries. In his analysis of the couplet, Stephen Booth compares the couplet to a proverb: "My desire is not to dull you, if I cannot delight you." Booth suggests that the poet does not wish to make his lover seem common with overabundant praise. Aitkins similarly suggests that the poet does not wish his praises to become annoying. Helen Vendler suggests that the poet uses proverbial language here to address the Fair Youth's seeming obsession with receiving praise; a personal plea would fall on deaf ears, so he makes his case rather impersonal.
