= Sonnet 85 =

« » Sonnet 85
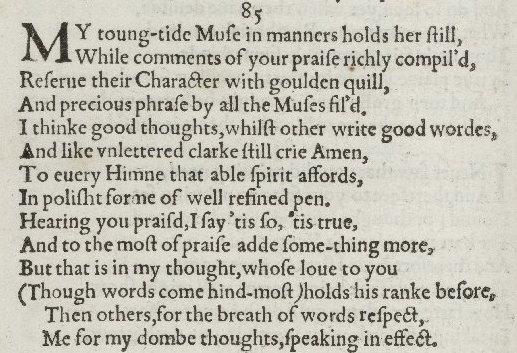
- Sonnet 85 in the 1609 Quarto
Q1
Q2
Q3
C
My tongue-tied Muse in manners holds her still,
While comments of your praise, richly compiled
Reserve their character with golden quill,
And precious phrase by all the Muses filed;
I think good thoughts, whilst other write good words,
And, like unletter’d clerk, still cry ‘Amen’
To every hymn that able spirit affords
In polished form of well-refined pen.
Hearing you praised, I say ‘’Tis so, ’tis true’,
And to the most of praise add something more;
But that is in my thought, whose love to you
(Though words come hindmost) holds his rank before;
Then others for the breath of words respect,
Me for my dumb thoughts, speaking in effect.
—William Shakespeare
4
8
12
14

Sonnet 85 is one of 154 sonnets published by the English playwright and poet William Shakespeare in 1609. It is part of the Fair Youth sequence, and the eighth sonnet of the Rival Poet group.

== Exegesis ==
This sonnet and the previous one (Sonnet 84) expand on the idea of the poet's silence. The poet is a tongue-tied observer, but recognizes the beautiful praises being expressed by a rival poet. The poet asserts that his own tacit, though inwardly felt devotion is worth even more. It is, paradoxically, a complexly eloquent sonnet supporting the superiority of unspoken love. The Muse (line 1) is holding her silence, and respectfully allowing the rival to speak. Or line 1 may be suggesting that the rival poet's flattery is rude, and it is a sense of manners that continues ("still") to maintain the poet in silence. The young man's character is being preserved (line 3) with beautiful fancy writing ("golden quill"). It was the job of the parish clerk to lead the congregation in saying aloud "amen"; an illiterate clerk might say "amen" too often (line 6). The poet's love maintains a place ahead of the others ("holds his rank before"). The couplet contextualizes the "breath" mentioned in Sonnet 81, and derogates words ("others for the breath of words respect") for being insubstantial as a breath, and favors the poet's own silent thoughts. The effect the young man is having on the poets is placed in two extremes: The poets are either spinning out glorious words and phrases, or they are struck dumb. Both extremes are contained in the paradox of this elaborately worded sonnet that speaks in favor of silence.

== Structure ==
Sonnet 85 is an English or Shakespearean sonnet, which has three quatrains, followed by a final rhyming couplet. It follows the rhyme scheme ABAB CDCD EFEF GG and is composed in iambic pentameter, a metre of five feet per line, with two syllables in each foot accented weak/strong. Most of the lines are examples of regular iambic pentameter, including the 1st line:

 ×   /     ×     /   ×   / ×     /    ×    / 
My tongue-tied Muse in manners holds her still

This is followed in line 2) by a reversal of the accents in the word "richly":

  ×     /  ×    /   ×     /    /  ×   ×   / 
While comments of your praise richly compiled (85.1-2)

/ = ictus, a metrically strong syllabic position. × = nonictus.

A reversal in the first foot occurs in line 9.

The meter calls for a few variant pronunciations: line 7's "spirit" can be pronounced as 1 syllable, and line 8's "refinèd" as 3.
