= Sonnet 87 =

« » Sonnet 87
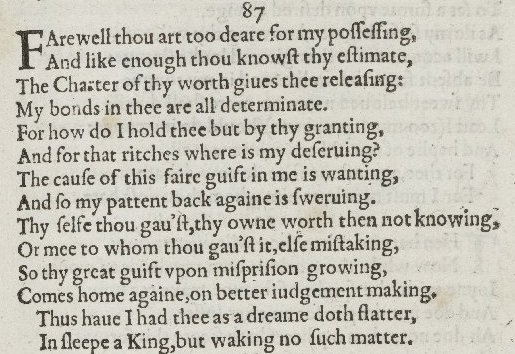
- Sonnet 87 in the 1609 Quarto
Q1
Q2
Q3
C
Farewell, thou art too dear for my possessing,
And like enough thou knowst thy estimate;
The charter of thy worth gives thee releasing;
My bonds in thee are all determinate.
For how do I hold thee but by thy granting,
And for that riches where is my deserving?
The cause of this fair gift in me is wanting,
And so my patent back again is swerving.
Thyself thou gav’st, thy own worth then not knowing,
Or me, to whom thou gav’st it, else mistaking;
So thy great gift upon misprision growing
Comes home again, on better judgment making.
Thus have I had thee as a dream doth flatter,
In sleep a king, but waking no such matter.
—William Shakespeare
4
8
12
14

Sonnet 87 is one of 154 sonnets published by the English playwright and poet William Shakespeare in 1609. It is part of the Fair Youth sequence, and sometimes included as the last sonnet in the Rival Poet group.

== Synopsis ==
The poet admits that he no longer possesses the love of the youth, whose worth is too great for the poet, who could only possess him while the youth did not recognise his own worth. His time with the youth was like a dream of greatness from which he has now woken.

Shakespeare says, in essence, that the Fair Youth is so much better than he is that Shakespeare can't possibly deserve him. Being unworthy, Shakespeare wants to release the Youth from the relationship so that "he can have the better life that he deserves". In the closing couplet, Shakespeare says that while the relationship lasted, he felt like a king, but now he realizes it was simply a dream.

The structure of the poem forms an interesting and logical argument and progression. In the first stanza he is saying you're too good for me, so I understand if you want to get rid of me. In the second stanza he is saying that I am nowhere close to good enough for you, but maybe you are not aware of it. And in the third stanza he is saying you are too good for me, but maybe you didn't realize that before. In the closing couplet, Shakespeare confesses that no matter what the cause of misjudgment, you're released by the mistake, and "I'm left here to remember our time together" when I felt like nobility.

== Structure ==
Sonnet 87 is an English or Shakespearean sonnet. The English sonnet has three quatrains, followed by a final rhyming couplet. It follows the typical rhyme scheme of the form, ABAB CDCD EFEF GG, and is composed in iambic pentameter, a type of poetic metre based on five pairs of metrically weak/strong syllabic positions. The 2nd line exemplifies a regular iambic pentameter:

×    /   × /      ×    /       × /  × / 
And like enough thou know'st thy estimate, (87.2)

However, (along with Sonnet 20) Sonnet 87 is extraordinary in Shakespeare's insistent use of final extrametrical syllables or feminine endings, which occur in all but lines 2 and 4; for example, in the first line:

 ×   /      ×  /    ×   /    ×   /  ×  / (×) 
Farewell! thou art too dear for my possessing, (87.1)

/ = ictus, a metrically strong syllabic position. × = nonictus. (×) = extrametrical syllable.

There is critical debate over their effect. Helen Vendler proposes that the feminine endings, similar to their intermittent use in Sonnet 126, parallel "the poet's unwillingness to let the young man go". She notes that 12 of the 14 lines end with feminine rhymes. The movement between feminine and masculine endings, with the feminine endings receiving emphasis, enacts a longing on the part of the speaker for the young man to stay. Atkins adopts the view that the monotony of the feminine endings creates a somber tone of loss. Lines 2 and 4 are the only lines without feminine endings and they "ending as they do in pyrrhic feet, give the same elegiac effect".

Beyond the frequent feminine endings, the meter is quite regular, but there are several significant cases in which, rather than the rhythm of the words determining the meter, the meter determines the rhythm of the words. This occurs especially in stretches of monosyllabic function words (like prepositions, conjunctions, and especially pronouns). The words at the beginning of line 5 could be emphasized in almost any combination and still deliver some sense; but when emphasized in accord with a regular meter, the reading "For how do I hold thee" underscores the antithetical rhetoric Shakespeare is known for. A similar effect can be heard in line 9's "thy own worth", and likely in line 13's "Thus have I had thee", emphasizing both the speaker's possession and its being past.

== Legal and financial imagery ==
Critics commonly agree that Shakespeare uses legal imagery as a metaphor for the relationship between the speaker and the young man. Helen Vendler and Stephen Booth are of the same opinion that the legal terms of the sonnet frame the relationship between the speaker and the young man as a contract now void because of the beloved's realization of his greater worth. The relationship between the speaker and the young man is expressed in the language of legal and financial transaction: "possessing", "estimate", "charter", "bonds", "determinate", "riches", and "patent" —also "dear" and "worth" in the financial sense. Booth, in addition to the above, understands hold and granting in a legal and financial sense as well.

Michael Andrews acknowledges the metaphorical use of legal and financial imagery like Vendler and Booth. However he proposes further that the legal and financial imagery, along with a "coolly ironic" tone, disguises the speaker's true feelings which only fully appear in the couplet: "Thus have I had thee as a dream doth flatter,/ In sleep a king, but waking no such matter." The couplet reveals that the speaker understands that the young man never fully gave himself. In this interpretation the legal and financial imagery of the three quatrains are more self-protective than sincere.

Murray Krieger offers a different view of the contract theory seen within Sonnet 87. In his analysis, he focuses his attention on the use of the word "dear" within the first line. He notes that the reader's initial deduction of the word "dear" implies the idea of affection. But this initial impression of the word on the reader is immediately confronted by the word "estimate", which essentially uncovers the reality of the speaker's lowly position to the young man. Kreiger furthermore notes that the legal and financial terms strongly imply the poet's bitterness towards his position: "at having love's world of troth reduced to the niggardly world of truth, the world of faith to the world of fact".

== Couplet ==
Though Vendler and Booth understand the legal imagery in a similar fashion, they differ in their understanding of the couplet. Vendler proposes that the couplet has a defective key word. Vendler identifies "gift" as the key word of the sonnet as "gift" and its variants "gives" and "gav'st" appear in all three quatrains in lines 3, 7, 9, 10, and 11. However, this key word is defective because it is absent in the couplet. Its absence in the couplet reflects the desertion of the "gift", the young man.

Booth understands the couplet to have sexual overtones. In the phrase, "I had thee as a dream" Booth suggests that "had" means "possessed sexually" or "embraced". Sexual dreams were a common Renaissance topic and Booth suggests that Shakespeare is playing on this usage. He cites Spenser's The Faerie Queene 1.1.47-49, Jonson's The Dream, Herrick's The Vine, Othello 3.3.416-432, and Gascoigne's Supposes, 1.2.133 as contemporary works that contain sexual dreams. Booth also proposes that "matter" in the closing line has a sexual meaning in addition to meaning "real substance". Here he cites examples of matter being used in its sexual sense in Hamlet 3.2.111: "country matter" and Julius Caesar 1.1.23: "women matters".

Richard Strier additionally notes the complexity of the word "flatter" not only within Sonnet 87 but within other Shakespeare sonnets as well. While the word has been used "in contexts of purely negative self-deception" as well as "in the context of providing genuine beauty," it is utilized within this poem as an "evocation of joy that is brief and delusive, but potent while it lasts". The phrase "as a dream doth flatter" correlates strongly with the Petrarchan view that earthly joys are briefly.

== Sexuality ==
Opening with the exclamation of "Farewell!" sonnet 87 reads very much like a break-up poem, which would suggest a romantic theme to it, and because of the sonnet's addressee, the suggestion turns into a homosexual romance. At the very least, Shakespeare thinks that he owes it to the youth to break up with him, due to what Pequigney calls "the narcissistic wound". Shakespeare's undermining of himself is proof of an apparent "wound to the ego".

Sonnet 87 is filled with over the top, romantic language towards the young man, with lines such as "Thus have I had thee as a dream doth flatter". Yet when watered down, Pequigney argues that this simply states that Shakespeare is only acknowledging that he enjoyed knowing the young man. The use of romantic language masks the idea that this is purely a platonic love between the two males. In the sonnets addressed towards the young man, such as sonnet 87, there is a lack of explicit sexual imagery which is prominent in the sonnets addressed towards the dark lady. This, as Pequigney claims, is further proof "that nothing sexually amiss is to be found in the lyrics of that Shakespeare composed for the youth."

A. L. Rowse, another Shakespearean critic, also rejects the existence of homoerotic suggestion in sonnet 87, arguing that the language of the time is simply so far from how we communicate today. The language between two friends "might be considered sexually implicit" in today's world, but hundreds of years earlier was simply friendly.
