= Sonnet 82 =

« » Sonnet 82
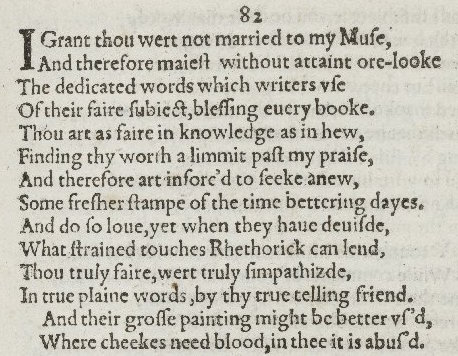
- Sonnet 82 in the 1609 Quarto
Q1
Q2
Q3
C
I grant thou wert not married to my Muse,
And therefore mayst without attaint o’erlook
The dedicated words which writers use
Of their fair subject, blessing every book.
Thou art as fair in knowledge as in hue,
Finding thy worth a limit past my praise,
And therefore art enforced to seek anew
Some fresher stamp of the time-bettering days,
And do so love; yet when they have devised
What strained touches rhetoric can lend,
Thou, truly fair, wert truly sympathized
In true plain words, by thy true-telling friend;
And their gross painting might be better used
Where cheeks need blood; in thee it is abused.
—William Shakespeare
4
8
12
14

Sonnet 82 is one of 154 sonnets published by William Shakespeare in a quarto titled Shakespeare's Sonnets in 1609. It is a part of the Fair Youth series of sonnets, and the fifth sonnet of the Rival Poet group.

== Exegesis ==
The speaker begins by allowing that the youth is not required to read only one poet. The speaker considers the words that other authors use. "Dedicated words" (line 3) refers to words used to dedicate their writings to the young man, and it could also refer to the writings themselves. The other writers use "dedicated words" indiscriminately in "blessing every book”; their mode is to use some "fresher stamp” that happens to be in fashion (line 8), which is the “strained touches” of rhetoric (line 10). Worst of all, other poets words take the form of unnecessary cosmetics (lines 13 - 14). Since the youth needs no flattery, all this does not compare well to the poet's description of his own better suited "plain words" (lines 11 - 12).

== Structure ==
Sonnet 82 is an English or Shakespearean sonnet, which has three quatrains, followed by a final rhyming couplet. It follows the rhyme scheme ABAB CDCD EFEF GG and is composed in iambic pentameter, a metre of five feet per line, with two syllables in each foot accented weak/strong. Most of the lines are examples of regular iambic pentameter, including the 2nd line:

 ×    /   ×    /     ×   /   ×  /    ×    / 
And therefore mayst without attaint o'erlook (82.2)

/ = ictus, a metrically strong syllabic position. × = nonictus.

The sonnet exhibits a few variations of the meter, some of which will depend on interpretation. The following lines may be read with metrical regularity, but also may be read with a rightward movement of the first ictus in line 4 (resulting in a four-position figure, × × / /, sometimes referred to as a minor ionic); and an initial reversal in line 5:

 ×   ×     /    /  ×      /  ×   /   ×  / 
Of their fair subject, blessing every book.

  /   ×   ×   /   ×    /  ×    /  ×   / 
Thou art as fair in knowledge as in hue, (82.4-5)

A reversal and minor ionic may be found in lines 6 and 8, respectively.

The meter calls for line 10's "strainèd" to be pronounced with 2 syllables.
