= Sonnet 86 =

« » Sonnet 86
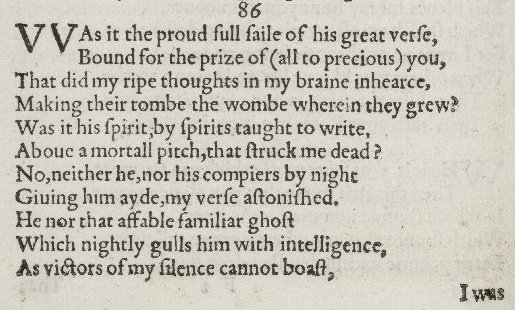
- The first eleven lines of Sonnet 86 in the 1609 Quarto
Q1
Q2
Q3
C
Was it the proud full sail of his great verse,
Bound for the prize of all-too-precious you,
That did my ripe thoughts in my brain in-hearse,
Making their tomb the womb wherein they grew?
Was it his spirit, by spirits taught to write
Above a mortal pitch, that struck me dead?
No, neither he, nor his compeers by night,
Giving him aid, my verse astonished.
He, nor that affable familiar ghost
Which nightly gulls him with intelligence,
As victors, of my silence cannot boast;
I was not sick of any fear from thence.
But when your countenance filled up his line,
Then lacked I matter, that enfeebled mine.
—William Shakespeare
4
8
12
14

Sonnet 86 is one of 154 sonnets first published by the English playwright and poet William Shakespeare in the Quarto of 1609. It is the final poem of the Rival Poet group of the Fair Youth sonnets in which Shakespeare writes about an unnamed young man and a rival poet competing for the youth's favor. Though the exact date of its composition is unknown, it has been suggested that the Rival Poet series may have been written between 1598 and 1600.

Sonnet 86 has attracted attention because it seems to offer clues to the identity of the Rival Poet.

== Exegesis ==
Sonnet 86 is one last attempt by the poet to explain why he has been struck silent, and how words seem useless when silence is the only decent expression. The sonnet describes in backwards motion the progress of his own anguish: In the first quatrain the poet in him is entombed, as the attempt and failure of the poet's writing process is described with a metaphor of a pregnancy and miscarriage (line 3). In the second quatrain the poet is struck dead, in the third he becomes sick. Running alongside of this, but in forward motion, there is a progressive derogation of the rival poet, a progress that starts high with the magnificent nautical metaphor of line one.

The sonnet's imagery of sea going vessels ("proud full sail") recalls the mighty galleons of the Spanish Armada that fought the British fleet of smaller, more nimble ships. The image of a galleon at full sail sailing in the direction of some treasure, invites admiration for the strength of the rival's poetry, and for the size of his ambition. This image is diminished in the second quatrain, when it is suggested that the rival is merely co-author along with his "compeers", and it is diminished further in the third quatrain when the rival is shown to be duped ("which nightly gulls him") by those "spirits".

The sonnet begins with the speaker asking whether it was the "great verse" of his rival poet that had prevented the speaker from expressing his own "ripe thoughts." According to Duncan-Jones, "As in the final line of the preceding sonnet, the speaker claims to be unable to voice his thoughts of love: they are ready for utterance (ripe), but remain buried (in-hearsed) in his brain because [the speaker's question proposes] he is intimidated by his rival." Harold Bloom considers this intimidation is not caused by the artistic skill of his rival. In the opening lines of the sonnet, "[Shakespeare] charmingly suggests an inhibition through jealousy, not of superior poetic powers, but of encountering the Fair Young Man's portrait in a rival's verses." Kenneth Muir writes: "Whether ‘the proud full sail of his great verse’ is sincere admiration [by the speaker of the sonnet] or a hint that [the rival's verse] is bombastic is still debated."

In the eighth line ("Giving him aid, my verse astonished") the word "astonished" is used with an earlier definition: "bereft of sensation; stunned, benumbed," in describing the speaker's verse.

The final line of the third quatrain ("I was not sick of any fear from thence") sets the stage for the couplet, and alludes to the fact that, while his fear did not come from "thence" (the rival poet), there is a fear that has silenced his writing.

The couplet returns to a primary theme of the entire Rival Poet group: that the young man is the only source of inspiration and the only proper subject. The couplet shows two extremes of response that the young man and his desire for flattery causes in his poets: the over-inflated verse of the rival and the silence of the speaker.

Sonnet 86 is expressed in the past tense, suggesting the end of the Rival Poets group, and a look back. The speaker indicates that his silence was not caused by the Rival Poet, but at his rival's "appropriation of the young man's favour" (line 13 and 14).

== Structure ==
The word sonnet ultimately derives from the Latin word for sound (sonus), and from the Old Occitan word for song (sonet). In 1573, George Gascoigne established an important definition of the English Sonnet:

I can best allowe to call those Sonnets which are of fourtene lynes, every line conteyning tenne syllables. The first twelve do ryme in staves of foure lines by crosse metre, and the last twoo ryming together do conclude the whole.

Sonnet 86 is an English or Shakespearean sonnet, which has three quatrains, followed by a final rhyming couplet. It follows the rhyme scheme, ABAB CDCD EFEF GG and is composed in iambic pentameter, a metre of five feet per line, with two syllables in each foot accented weak/strong. It follows the English Sonnet form described by Gascoigne. However it follows the earlier Petrarchan model in one way — by placing the volta at the start of line nine.

Most of the lines are examples of regular iambic pentameter, including the 6th line:

 × /  ×  /  ×    /      ×     /    ×   / 
Above a mortal pitch, that struck me dead? (86.6)

/ = ictus, a metrically strong syllabic position. × = nonictus.

Line two contains the first of a few possible reversals of the accent in first foot:

  /    ×   ×    /    ×  /   ×    /   ×   / 
Bound for the prize of all-too-precious you, (86.2)

Reversals also occur at the start of lines four and eight. Possible reversals occur at the start of lines one, five, seven, nine, and twelve; while possible reversals occur in the middle of lines three, seven, and thirteen.

The meter calls for the word "spirit" in line five to be pronounced with one syllable, while the word "spirits" has two. Line eight's "astonishèd" is pronounced with four syllables.

== Possible clues to the identity of the rival poet ==
It is not known who the rival poet is. Nearly every well-known poet contemporary with Shakespeare has been suggested, including George Chapman, Christopher Marlowe, Edmund Spenser, Samuel Daniel, Michael Drayton, Barnabe Barnes, Gervase Markham, and Richard Barnfield.

The second and third quatrains have garnered attention as possibly containing clues to the identity of the rival poet. The description of a poet "by spirits taught to write" (line 5) has led some to name George Chapman as candidate, due to Chapman's supposed spiritual inspiration by the ghost of Homer. The phrase "Above a mortal pitch, that struck me dead" (line 6) has suggested to some Christopher Marlowe (who died in 1593) and his play Tamburlaine the Great.

Shakespearean scholar Eric Sams considers the descriptions of spiritual communication in the second quatrain ("spirits taught to write") to perhaps suggest Barnabe Barnes as the Rival Poet, noting Barnes' interest in occultism in 16th century England.

In the third quatrain, lines nine and ten are seen to reference a specific poet. Of the "affable familiar ghost" found in line nine, Duncan-Jones writes: "The phrase seems to carry an allusion to some well-known relationship between a poet and his Muse or inspiring genius, such as Chapman's with the spirit of Homer."

Regarding the Rival Poet's identity, Sams reads the first line of the couplet (line 13) as a possible reference to Barnes's 1593 work Parthenophil and Parthenophe:

One phrase in Sonnet 86 echoes Barnes, namely "when your countenance filled up his line." Barnes's sonnet to Southampton includes the actual words "your countenance." Thus Southampton's favour is solicited for the love−lyrics of Parthenophil and Parthenophe, so "that with your countenance graced they may withstand" envy and criticism. The word "countenance" has indeed "filled up" Barnes's line—to overflowing, since it adds an extra syllable.
