= Sonnet 83 =

« » Sonnet 83
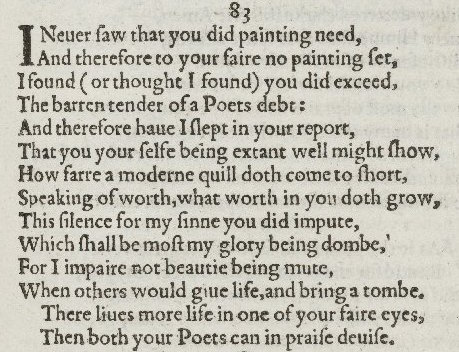
- Sonnet 83 in the 1609 Quarto
Q1
Q2
Q3
C
I never saw that you did painting need,
And therefore to your fair no painting set;
I found, or thought I found, you did exceed
The barren tender of a poet’s debt;
And therefore have I slept in your report,
That you yourself, being extant, well might show
How far a modern quill doth come too short,
Speaking of worth, what worth in you doth grow.
This silence for my sin you did impute,
Which shall be most my glory, being dumb;
For I impair not beauty, being mute,
When others would give life, and bring a tomb.
There lives more life in one of your fair eyes
Than both your poets can in praise devise.
—William Shakespeare
4
8
12
14

Sonnet 83 is one of 154 sonnets published by William Shakespeare in a quarto titled Shakespeare's Sonnets in 1609. It is a part of the Fair Youth group of sonnets, and the sixth sonnet of the Rival Poet group.

== Exegesis ==
The poet says that he has not seen that the young man needed to be described in a flattering way ("painting"), and so he has not attempted it. Line 4 ("I found, or thought I found") suggests that he has been rebuked for being silent, which is also suggested in line 9 ("this silence for my sin you did impute"). "Modern quill" suggests an inadequately ordinary kind of writing, and the whole of line 7 ("How far a modern quill doth come too short") contains a sexual inadequacy pun aimed at the rival poet or poets. The third quatrain is so insistent on the poet's silence ("silence" "dumb" "mute") that it suggests deliberateness. Line 12 suggests that when other poets attempt to bring the young man to life in their descriptions, they in fact do the opposite. ("When others would give life and bring a tomb.")

== Structure ==
Sonnet 83 is an English or Shakespearean sonnet, which has three quatrains, followed by a final rhyming couplet. It follows the rhyme scheme ABBA ABBA CDCD EE and is composed in iambic pentameter, a metre of five feet per line, with two syllables in each foot accented weak/strong. Most of the lines are examples of regular iambic pentameter, including the 7th line:

 ×   /  ×  /  ×   /     ×     /   ×    / 
How far a modern quill doth come too short,

  /  ×    ×   /      ×    /    ×  /   ×     / 
Speaking of worth, what worth in you doth grow. (83.7-8)

/ = ictus, a metrically strong syllabic position. × = nonictus.

It is followed (in line 8) by an initial reversal, a common metrical variation.

The meter calls for line 6's "being" to function as 1 syllable.

== Interpretations ==
- Imelda Staunton, for the 2002 compilation album, When Love Speaks (EMI Classics)
