= Sonnet 93 =

« » Sonnet 93
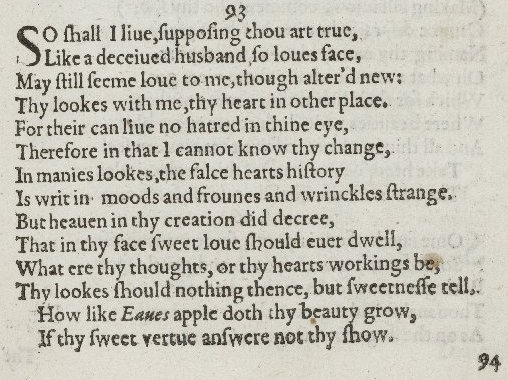
- Sonnet 93 in the 1609 Quarto
Q1
Q2
Q3
C
So shall I live, supposing thou art true,
Like a deceived husband; so love’s face
May still seem love to me, though alter’d new;
Thy looks with me, thy heart in other place:
For there can live no hatred in thine eye,
Therefore in that I cannot know thy change.
In many’s looks the false heart’s history
Is writ in moods and frowns and wrinkles strange,
But heaven in thy creation did decree
That in thy face sweet love should ever dwell;
Whate’er thy thoughts or thy heart’s workings be,
Thy looks should nothing thence but sweetness tell.
How like Eve’s apple doth thy beauty grow,
If thy sweet virtue answer not thy show!
—William Shakespeare
4
8
12
14

Sonnet 93 is one of 154 sonnets written by the English playwright and poet William Shakespeare. It is a member of the Fair Youth sequence, in which the poet expresses his love towards a young man.

== Synopsis ==
Continuing the alarmed discovery at the end of Sonnet 92, the poet here explores what it would be like to be living a life in which the young man's deceiving of him is simply unknown to the poet. Instead of dying at the moment of discovery of falsity, the poet now lives 'like a deceived husband'.

The vocabulary of this sonnet repeats terms that appear throughout the sequence, and gives readers a sense of the sequence feeding off itself, finding source in its own prior utterances.

Sonnet 93 features 'face' twice (15 times in the whole sequence), 'looks' twice (12 times in the whole sequence), and 'love' also twice ('love', unsurprisingly appears frequently, 172 times, throughout the Q1609 sequence).

Remarkably, the poet imagines himself as being like a 'deceived husband': directly relating his friendship with the young man to marriage. The sonnet ends with the allusion to 'Eve's apple', making the 'deceived husband', the poet in line 2, into a version of Adam, and the betrayal into a version of the Fall. Otherwise, religious references in the poem seem facile or inflated: 'heaven in thy creation did decree' etc. Readers are confronted again to the exaggerated sense of betrayal expressed in these sonnets - what kind of claim could the poet have thought he had over the young man?

The final line of the sonnet expresses the contradiction described by the poet between the young man's beautiful 'show' and his "false heart's history" mentioned above. The poet writes that the young man's duplicitous inner 'workings' are not showing themselves in 'moods and frowns and wrinkles strange'. 'Workings' is a rare word in Shakespeare, only here and in the near contemporary Henry IV Part 2. The unreadable, always beautiful face of the young man looks forward in the Q1609 sequence to the face of the 'woman coloured ill' in the final group of so-called 'Dark Lady' sonnets, where face and deeds match, rather than the young man's mismatch of lovely appearance and morally questionable behaviour.

This sonnet perhaps struggles to get the attention of experienced readers of the sequence, as it is followed by a far more striking sonnet, 94, and such readers might always be tempted to turn to the utterly unformulaic sonnet that follows.

== Structure ==
Sonnet 93 is notionally an English or Shakespearean sonnet. The English sonnet has three quatrains, followed by a final rhyming couplet. However, in terms of its syntactical units, sonnet 93 breaks down into 6 lines, another 6, then the closing couplet. It still follows the typical rhyme scheme of the form, ABAB CDCD EFEF GG, and is composed in iambic pentameter, a type of poetic metre based on five pairs of metrically weak/strong syllabic positions. The 5th line exemplifies a regular iambic pentameter:

 ×    /    ×   /    ×  /  ×  /    ×   / 
For there can live no hatred in thine eye, (93.5)

/ = ictus, a metrically strong syllabic position. × = nonictus.

The meter demands a few variant pronunciations: line 2's "deceivèd" has three syllables, and line 9's "heaven" functions as one.
