= Sonnet 84 =

« » Sonnet 84
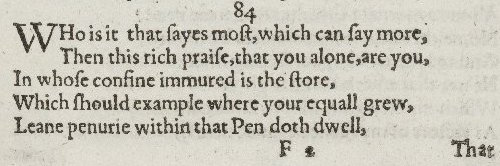
- The first five lines of Sonnet 84 in the 1609 Quarto
Q1
Q2
Q3
C
Who is it that says most? Which can say more,
Than this rich praise: that you alone are you,
In whose confine immured is the store
Which should example where your equal grew?
Lean penury within that pen doth dwell
That to his subject lends not some small glory;
But he that writes of you, if he can tell
That you are you, so dignifies his story.
Let him but copy what in you is writ,
Not making worse what nature made so clear,
And such a counterpart shall fame his wit,
Making his style admired everywhere.
You to your beauteous blessings add a curse,
Being fond on praise, which makes your praises worse.
—William Shakespeare
4
8
12
14

Sonnet 84 is one of 154 sonnets published by the English playwright and poet, William Shakespeare in 1609. It is part of the Fair Youth sequence, and the seventh sonnet of the Rival Poet group.

== Exegesis ==
This poem extends the debate of the Rival Poet group of sonnets: Is the young man praised best in the simple, true and straightforward manner of the speaker, or in the more rhetorically flamboyant style of other poets? The first quatrain asks: Which of the poets can say more to the young man than “You are uniquely you? Inside of you is stored all that can offer the example (or simile) worthy (or equal) of you?” The suggestion is that there is no simile worthy, and without a simile or metaphor there will be no poetry. The second quatrain says that it is an impoverished pen that cannot write something to add some glory to his subject, but in the youth's case all that writer needs to do is simply describe the youth. Just copy, don't make it worse, and the writer will become famous for his wit. The couplet points out that the desire the youth has for flattery hurts the praise he receives, because that praise is not the simple, and ideal description — it is mere flattery. This is an idea that sounds like the problem Cordelia has in King Lear: Whatever she can say about her father, he wants flattery, and she cannot satisfy that desire.

== Structure ==
Sonnet 84 is an English or Shakespearean sonnet, which has three quatrains, followed by a final rhyming couplet. It follows the rhyme scheme ABAB CDCD EFEF GG and is composed in iambic pentameter, a metre of five feet per line, with two syllables in each foot accented weak/strong. Most of the lines are examples of regular iambic pentameter, including the 11th line:

 ×   /   ×   /  ×   /    ×     /   ×    / 
And such a counterpart shall fame his wit

Line 12 has a variation in the first foot – a reversal of the accent:

 /  ×   ×    /   ×  /  ×   / ×    / 
Making his style admired every where. (84.11-12)

/ = ictus, a metrically strong syllabic position. × = nonictus.

The meter calls for a few variant pronunciations: line 3's "confine" may be stressed on the second syllable (even though a noun) and "immurèd" needs to be pronounced with 3 syllables; while line 13's "beauteous" is pronounced with only 2 syllables and line 14's "being" only 1.
