= Sonnet 89 =

« » Sonnet 89
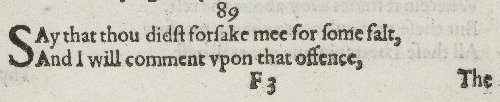
- The first two lines of Sonnet 89 in the 1609 Quarto
Q1
Q2
Q3
C
Say that thou didst forsake me for some fault,
And I will comment upon that offence;
Speak of my lameness, and I straight will halt,
Against thy reasons making no defence.
Thou canst not, love, disgrace me half so ill,
To set a form upon desired change,
As I’ll myself disgrace, knowing thy will;
I will acquaintance strangle and look strange,
Be absent from thy walks; and in my tongue
Thy sweet beloved name no more shall dwell,
Lest I, too much profane, should do it wrong,
And haply of our old acquaintance tell.
For thee, against myself I’ll vow debate;
For I must ne’er love him whom thou dost hate.
—William Shakespeare
4
8
12
14

Sonnet 89 is one of 154 sonnets written by the English playwright and poet William Shakespeare. It is a member of the Fair Youth sequence, in which the poet expresses his love towards a young man.

== Synopsis ==
The poet tells a youth that he can say he abandoned the poet for some fault and he will admit it. The poet will deliberately absent himself and stop discussing the youth, since he cannot even like himself if the youth no longer cares for him.

== The Quarto text ==
Stephen Booth notes that two of the known 13 copies of Q1609 read 'proface' in line 11, the rest have 'prophane', and that this evidences printing house correction while the work was in the press.

== Structure ==
Sonnet 89 is an English or Shakespearean sonnet, which has three quatrains, followed by a final rhyming couplet. However, in Q1609, quatrain two and quatrain three constitute a complete sentence running from line 5 through to line 12. Vendler suggests a 4-8-2 structure. Kerrigan and Burrow punctuate with a full stop at the end of line 7. It can be concluded that finding a clear 4,4,4,2 structure is not easy here. Sonnet 91 has a comparable variation from 4,4,4,2 to a 6-6-2 structure. Its rhyme scheme is ABAB CDCD EFEF GG. It is composed in lines of iambic pentameter, a poetic metre based on five feet in each line, and two syllables in each foot accented weak/strong. Most of the lines are examples of regular iambic pentameter, including the 4th line:

 ×   /    ×  /   ×   /   ×   /  ×   / 
Against thy reasons making no defence. (89.4)

/ = ictus, a metrically strong syllabic position. × = nonictus.

The 1st line exhibits a common metrical variation, the initial reversal:

 /    ×    ×   /     ×  /    ×  /   ×    / 
Say that thou didst forsake me for some fault, (89.1)

This variation is repeated in the 3rd line. A mid-line reversal occurs on "knowing" in line 7.

== Critical Discussion ==
Gerald Hammond (The Reader and Shakespeare's Young Man Sonnets) contrasts his view of the group of sonnets 88–93 with that of Martin Seymour-Smith (in his headnote to sonnet 88 in his edition). Against Seymour-Smith's account of "psychologically peculiar" sonnets, in which the poet sought "to demolish the edifice of his own ego", Hammond asserts that the sonnets seek to "maintain and strengthen the ego, rather than destroy it".

To contemporary readers, there may seem something 'passive-aggressive' about this sonnet: the emotional manipulation of the extremity of the language in "acquaintance strangle and look strange" looks like a strategy of overstatement, culminating in the statement that the poet is hated.

The sonnet utilizes many and repeated pronouns: 'I' (seven times), 5 instances of 'me','my' and 'myself'. The opposing force to this is constituted of 'thy' four times, 'thou' three times, and a 'thee'. The main body of the sonnet, however, concludes with an expression of former mutuality "our old acquaintance". It is quite typical for a love poem to pivot between 'I' and 'you' (or 'thee'). Shakespeare seems to write knots of 'you' sonnets (as in the 'rival poet' part of the sequence: at 87 a new tonality came in with the dramatic announcement of 'Farewell, thou art too dear for my possessing'. In sonnet 89, the emotional severing of 'I' and 'thou' leads to a poignant and pointed reminder of 'our old acquaintance'. 'Old acquaintance' is a common enough term in the period, and appears elsewhere in Shakespeare, but it can carry a large emotional charge: Antonio in Twelfth Night is pained when Viola (as 'Cesario') does not respond to his impassioned words to a person he takes to be Sebastian; in Coriolanus, Cominius confronts an old acquaintance who will not answer to his former name, nor acknowledge a previous connection:

Yet one time he did call me by my name: 
I urged our old acquaintance, and the drops 
That we have bled together. Coriolanus 
He would not answer to: forbad all names; 
He was a kind of nothing, titleless, 
Till he had forged himself a name o' the fire 
Of burning Rome.

Hammond asserts that the concluding couplet, "wooden in rhythm and childish in its paradox... sums up the sterile argument" of sonnets 88 and 89. 'For thee, against myself' is the poet's argument, 'love' is now ruled out: the relationship has turned into the young man's imputed hate and the self-hatred espoused by the poet. The couplet does at least convey this stark reduction of 'old acquaintance' to hate. More importantly, it prepares the reader for the opening of Sonnet 90, 'Then hate me when thou wilt, if ever, now'.
