= Sonnet 97 =

« » Sonnet 97
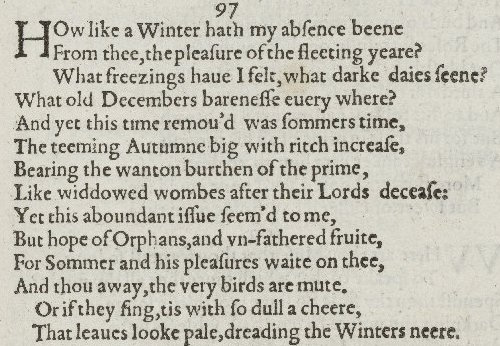
- Sonnet 97 in the 1609 Quarto
Q1
Q2
Q3
C
How like a winter hath my absence been
From thee, the pleasure of the fleeting year!
What freezings have I felt, what dark days seen!
What old December’s bareness every where!
And yet this time remov’d was summer’s time;
The teeming autumn, big with rich increase,
Bearing the wanton burthen of the prime,
Like widowed wombs after their lords’ decease:
Yet this abundant issue seem’d to me
But hope of orphans and unfather’d fruit;
For summer and his pleasures wait on thee,
And, thou away, the very birds are mute;
Or, if they sing, ’tis with so dull a cheer
That leaves look pale, dreading the winter’s near.
—William Shakespeare
4
8
12
14

Sonnet 97 is one of 154 sonnets written by the English playwright and poet William Shakespeare. It is a member of the Fair Youth sequence, in which the poet expresses his love towards a young man. It is the first of three sonnets describing a separation between the speaker and the beloved.

== Paraphrase ==
My separation from you has seemed like winter, since you give pleasure to the year. Winter has seemed to be everywhere, even though in reality our separation occurred during summer and fall, when the earth produces plant life like a widow giving birth after the death of her husband. Yet I saw these fruits of nature as hopeless orphans, since it could not be summer unless you were here; since you were away, even the birds did not sing, or rather sang so plaintively that they made the very leaves look pale, thinking of winter.

== Structure ==
Sonnet 97 is an English or Shakespearean sonnet. The English sonnet has three quatrains, followed by a final rhyming couplet. It follows the typical rhyme scheme of the form, ABAB CDCD EFEF GG, and is composed in iambic pentameter, a type of poetic metre based on five pairs of metrically weak/strong syllabic positions. The 6th line exemplifies a regular iambic pentameter:

  ×  /  ×   /  ×     /   ×    /   ×   / 
The teeming autumn, big with rich increase,

 /  ×     ×  /  ×   /  ×  /    ×   / 
Bearing the wanton burden of the prime, (97.6-7)

/ = ictus, a metrically strong syllabic position. × = nonictus.

It is followed (in line 7) by an initial reversal, a fairly common metrical variation which also potentially occurs in lines 1, 9, and 13. A mid-line inversion occurs in line 8 and, more plainly, line 14:

  ×   /      ×    /      /  ×     ×  /  ×     / 
That leaves look pale, dreading the winter's near. (97.14)

== Sources and analysis ==
Following Edmond Malone, T. W. Baldwin notes a resemblance between this poem's trope for the seasons and the "childing autumn" of A Midsummer Night's Dream 2.1.112; he traces the figure to Ovid.

Dowden says that 97 seems to begin a new group of sonnets, comprising 97, 98, and 99. Edward Hubler remarks on the "passages of unobtrusive melody and easy grace."

Thematically, the poem belongs among those poems treating absence or separation. Hilton Landry groups the sonnet with others, such as 54 and 55, in which the speaker is forced to call to mind an inferior mental substitute for his absent beloved.
