= Quintain (poetry) =

Poetic form containing five lines

A quintain or pentastich is any poetic form containing five lines. Examples include the tanka, the cinquain, the quintilla, Shakespeare's Sonnet 99, and the limerick.

== Examples ==
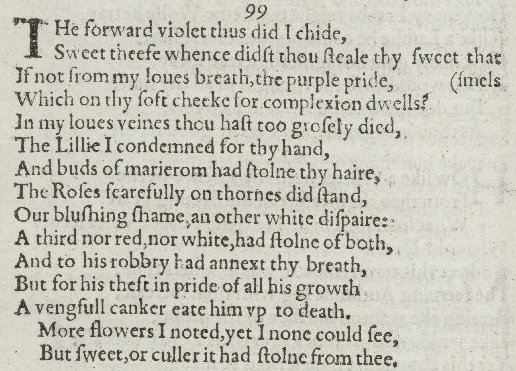
Shakespeare's Sonnet 99 in the 1609 quarto

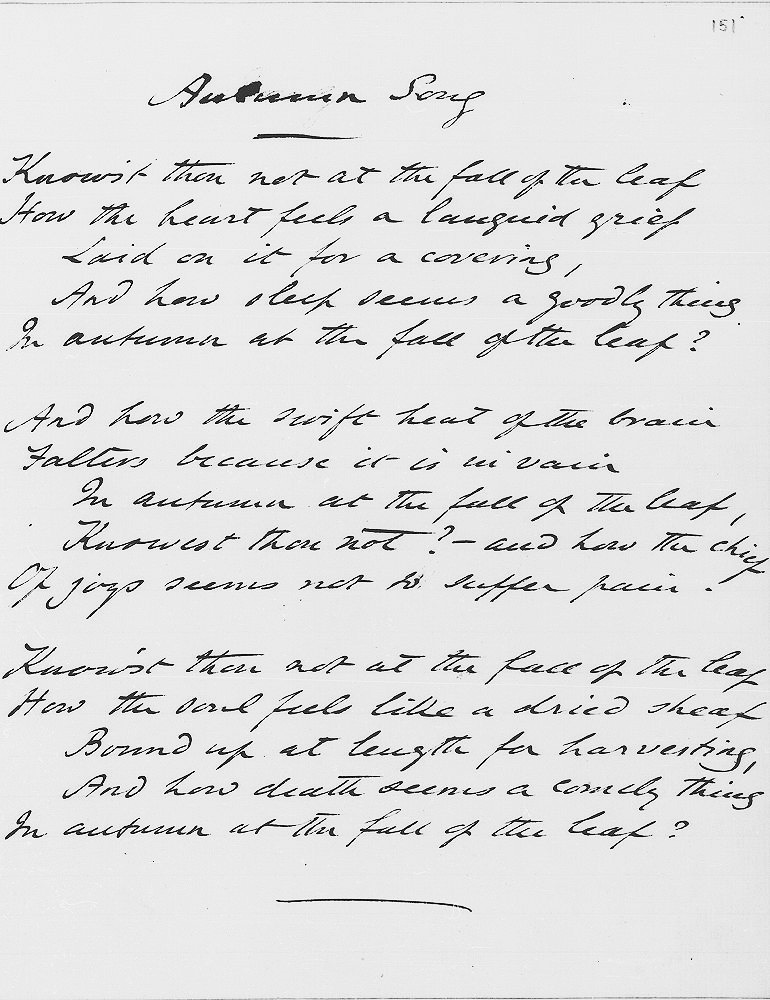
Original manuscript of "Autumn Song" by Dante Gabriel Rossetti, 1848, in the Ashley Library.

=== Sonnet 99 (first stanza) ===
The forward violet thus did I chide:
Sweet thief, whence didst thou steal thy sweet that smells
If not from my love’s breath? The purple pride
Which on thy soft cheek for complexion dwells,
In my love’s veins thou hast too grossly dyed.

— William Shakespeare

=== Autumn Song ===
Know'st thou not at the fall of the leaf
How the heart feels a languid grief
Laid on it for a covering,
And how sleep seems a goodly thing
In Autumn at the fall of the leaf?

And how the swift beat of the brain
Falters because it is in vain,
In Autumn at the fall of the leaf
Knowest thou not? and how the chief
Of joys seems—not to suffer pain?

Know'st thou not at the fall of the leaf
How the soul feels like a dried sheaf
Bound up at length for harvesting,
And how death seems a comely thing
In Autumn at the fall of the leaf?

— Dante Gabriel Rossetti

=== The Corporal (extract) ===
Half of my youth I watched the soldiers
And saw mechanic clerk and cook
Subsumed beneath a uniform.
Gray black and khaki was their look
Whose tool and instrument was death.

I watched them wheel on white parade grounds.
How could the flesh have such control?
Ballets with symmetry of the flower
Outlined the aspect of a soul
Whose pure precision was of death.

— Thom Gunn

=== Praise to the Lord, the Almighty ===
Praise to the Lord, the Almighty, the King of creation,
O my soul, praise him, for he is thy health and salvation:
All ye who hear
Now to his temple draw near,
Joining in glad adoration.

— Catherine Winkworth

== See also ==
- Mukhammas
- Stanza
