= Sonnet 99 =

« » Sonnet 99
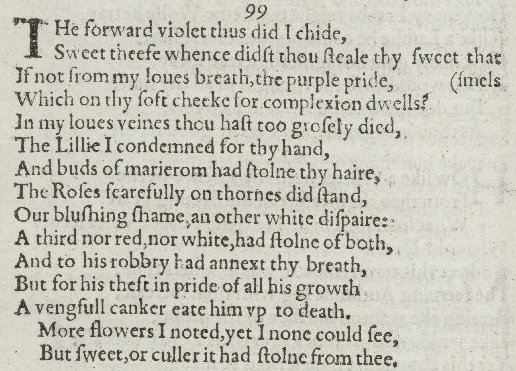
- Sonnet 99 in the 1609 Quarto
Q1
Q2
Q3
C
The forward violet thus did I chide:
Sweet thief whence didst thou steal thy sweet that smells
If not from my love’s breath, the purple pride
Which on thy soft cheek for complexion dwells?
In my love’s veins thou hast too grossly dyed,
The lily I condemned for thy hand,
And buds of marjoram had stol’n thy hair,
The roses fearfully on thorns did stand,
One blushing shame, another white despair:
A third nor red, nor white, had stol’n of both,
And to his robb'ry had annex’d thy breath,
But for his theft in pride of all his growth
A vengeful canker eat him up to death.
More flowers I noted, yet I none could see,
But sweet, or colour it had stol’n from thee.
—William Shakespeare
5
9
13
15

Sonnet 99 is one of 154 sonnets written by the English playwright and poet William Shakespeare. It is a member of the Fair Youth sequence, in which the poet expresses his love towards a young man. The sonnet is generally grouped with the preceding two in the sequence, with which it shares a dominant trope and image set: the beloved is described in terms of, and judged superior to, nature and its beauties.

== Paraphrase ==
I criticized the violet, telling it that it had stolen its sweet smell from my beloved's breath, and its purple color from my beloved's veins. I told the lily it had stolen the whiteness of your (that is, the beloved's) hands, and marjoram had stolen the beloved's hair; a third flower had stolen from both; in fact, all flowers had stolen something from the person of the beloved.

== Structure ==
Sonnet 99 is one of only three irregular sonnets in Shakespeare's sequence (the others being Sonnet 126 which structurally is not a sonnet at all but rather a poem of six pentameter couplets, and Sonnet 145 which has the typical rhyme scheme but is written in iambic tetrameter). Whereas a typical English or Shakespearean sonnet has three quatrains, followed by a final rhyming couplet, with the rhyme scheme ABAB CDCD EFEF GG, this sonnet begins with a quintain yielding the rhyme scheme ABABA CDCD EFEF GG. Like the other sonnets (except Sonnet 145) it is composed in iambic pentameter, a type of poetic metre based on five pairs of metrically weak/strong syllabic positions. The 8th line exemplifies a regular iambic pentameter:

  ×  / ×   /   ×  / ×    /     ×    / 
The roses fearfully on thorns did stand, (99.8)

/ = ictus, a metrically strong syllabic position. × = nonictus.

The meter demands several variant pronunciations: line 1's "violet" is pronounced with three syllables, line 6's "condemnèd" also with three, line 11's "robbery" with two. Line 14's "flowers" is pronounced as one syllable, and "stol'n" always appears as one syllable (in lines 7, 10, and 15).

Line 13's "eate" equals modern past tense "ate".

As to its fifteen lines, sonnet structure has never been absolutely fixed, and Sidney Lee adduces many examples of fifteen-line sonnets. An extra line is particularly common in linked sonnets, and this sonnet is linked to 98; Malone ended 98 with a colon to demonstrate the connection. However, other scholars have remarked on the clumsiness of the first line and suggested that the quarto text represents an unrevised draft that found its way into print.

== Source and analysis ==
Edward Massey and others asserted that the poem was directly inspired by a poem in Henry Constable's Diana (1592); T. W. Baldwin rejected this claim while noting that the same Constable sonnet had inspired a passage in The Rape of Lucrece. At any rate, the conceit is common, and parallels have been found in the poems by Edmund Spenser, Thomas Campion, and others. George Wilson praised the poem as an example of synesthesia.

The sonnet has attracted some attention as one of those that appears to provide clues about the historical identity of Shakespeare's subject (on the traditional assumption that the poems are in some sense autobiographical). In 1904, C. C. Stopes noted the existence of a portrait of Southampton at Welbeck Abbey in which his hair curls in a manner similar to young marjoram. This analysis has been disputed by scholars who assert that smell, rather than appearance, is the primary referent of Shakespeare's line. Because of the extravagant praise of the beloved's body, some Victorian scholars were reluctant to believe that the poem was addressed to a man; current consensus, however, groups it with the other poems written to the young man.
