= Sonnet 88 =

« » Sonnet 88
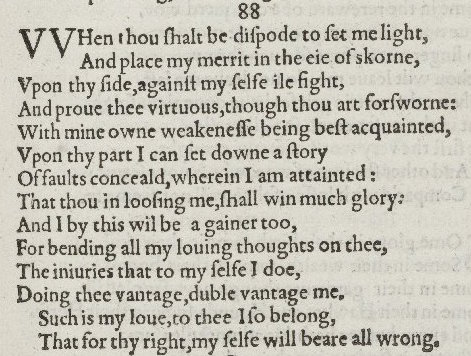
- Sonnet 88 in the 1609 Quarto
Q1
Q2
Q3
C
When thou shalt be disposed to set me light,
And place my merit in the eye of scorn,
Upon thy side, against myself, I’ll fight,
And prove thee virtuous, though thou art forsworn:
With mine own weakness being best acquainted,
Upon thy part I can set down a story
Of faults concealed, wherein I am attainted,
That thou, in losing me, shalt win much glory;
And I by this will be a gainer too,
For bending all my loving thoughts on thee,
The injuries that to myself I do,
Doing thee vantage, double vantage me:
Such is my love, to thee I so belong,
That for thy right myself will bear all wrong.
—William Shakespeare
4
8
12
14

Sonnet 88 is one of 154 sonnets published in 1609 by the English playwright and poet William Shakespeare. It's one of the Fair Youth sequence.

Sonnet 88 continues the theme of a division between the two friends, based on their differing sense of values. The poet offers to support the young man's rejection of him by listing the poet's own faults, and in this way give double support to the young man.

The paradoxical ideas of self-wounding in this sonnet are outlandish enough, that it is difficult to accept a sincere desire for self-immolation on the poet's part. This is especially clear in the context of other sonnets in the sequence that deal with a division between the poet and the young man. The poet does reserve for himself the story-telling posture ("I can set down a story"), which includes the considerable powers of poetry, powers that have been a recurring theme in the sonnets.

== Structure ==
Sonnet 88 is an English or Shakespearean sonnet, which has three quatrains, followed by a final rhyming couplet. It follows the rhyme scheme, abab cdcd efef gg and is composed in iambic pentameter lines, which is a poetic metre in which each line has five feet, and each foot has two syllables accented weak/strong. Most of the lines are regular iambic pentameter, including the first line:

  ×    /    ×    /  ×    /   ×  /   ×   / 
When thou shalt be disposed to set me light, (88.1)

Each line of the second quatrain ends with an extra syllable known as a feminine ending:

  ×    /   ×   /  ×  /   ×    /   ×    /  × 
That thou in losing me shalt win much glory (88.8)

/ = ictus, a metrically strong syllabic position. × = nonictus. (×) = extrametrical syllable.

The meter needs the word "virtuous" in line four to have two syllables.

== Analysis and criticism ==
A key to understanding this sonnet is found in the words "gainer" and "vantage". The speaker envisages an inevitable (i.e. "When"), vigorous and adversarial incident between the sonnet's "I" and the addressee, "thou". This conflict is established by the words "scorn", "side", "fight", "losing", "win", "gainer", "vantage" and "double-vantage". At first sight the sonnet's final couplet seems to confirm a subservience of the speaker to the addressee which was apparently established earlier in the sonnet and earlier in the sequence. In 1963 Martin Seymore-Smith said of this sonnet, "Not only does Shakespeare intend to love to the bitter end, but also he proposes to demolish the edifice of his own ego by this process of identification with the Friend" and that if we do not understand this "we have little chance of understanding the Sonnets as a whole." In 1924 T.G. Tucker noted that "double-vantage" is from tennis, and apparently means that I, your opponent, myself get "vantage" every time I thus yield it to you". In 2009 Fred Blick found, based on his research into the tennis of Shakespeare's time, that "double-vantage" meant a win i.e. two vantage points in succession after a score of deuce (reflected in the sonnet's number 8 – 8) to win a "set", just as it means today. The word "set" then also meant a bet or stake (see OED, v. B. trans., 14, and the Fool in King Lear, "Set less than thou throwest", presumably at dice, I, iv, 123). Tennis was in Shakespeare's day almost always played as a gamble or "set", hence the origin of the scoring call "game and set". This casts a new light on the typically Shakespearean resonance of the words in line 1, "set me light" (bet against me at scornful odds) and line 6, "set down". Fred Blick has also shown that after sonnet 88 the speaker of the sonnets becomes more critical of the addressee and less subservient to him. Sonnet 126, at the end of the Fair Youth sequence, finally condemns to mortality the "lovely boy" as a mere human, no more than an equal of the mortal speaker. Helen Vendler notes that the "doubling vantage that is the theme of the sestet of 88 helps to organize the whole Sonnet".
