= Sonnet 103 =

« » Sonnet 103
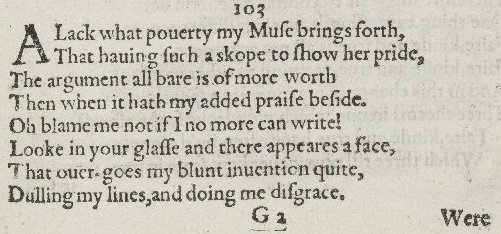
- The first two stanzas of Sonnet 103 in the 1609 Quarto
Q1
Q2
Q3
C
Alack, what poverty my Muse brings forth,
That having such a scope to show her pride,
The argument, all bare, is of more worth
Than when it hath my added praise beside!
O, blame me not, if I no more can write!
Look in your glass, and there appears a face
That over-goes my blunt invention quite,
Dulling my lines and doing me disgrace.
Were it not sinful then, striving to mend,
To mar the subject that before was well?
For to no other pass my verses tend
Than of your graces and your gifts to tell;
And more, much more, than in my verse can sit,
Your own glass shows you when you look in it.
—William Shakespeare
4
8
12
14

Sonnet 103 is one of 154 sonnets written by the English playwright and poet William Shakespeare. It is a member of the Fair Youth sequence, in which the poet expresses his love towards a young man.

== Synopsis ==
The poet says that his feeble lines cannot do justice to the subject's beauty, but merely mar it with their own inadequacy. The poet's only achievements are the result of that beauty, which is much more clearly visible simply by looking in a mirror.

== Structure ==
Sonnet 103 is an English or Shakespearean sonnet. The English sonnet has three quatrains, followed by a final rhyming couplet. It follows the typical rhyme scheme of the form ABAB CDCD EFEF GG and is composed in iambic pentameter, a type of poetic metre based on five pairs of metrically weak/strong syllabic positions. The 7th line exemplifies a regular iambic pentameter:

  ×  / ×   /    ×   /   ×  /   ×   / 
That over-goes my blunt invention quite,

 /  ×    ×  /     ×    /×    /  ×   / 
Dulling my lines, and doing me disgrace. (103.7-8)

/ = ictus, a metrically strong syllabic position. × = nonictus.

This is followed (in line 8) by a common metrical variation: the initial reversal, which also occurs in line 6. Inversions may also occur mid-line, as in line 9's "striving".
