= Sonnet 75 =

« » Sonnet 75
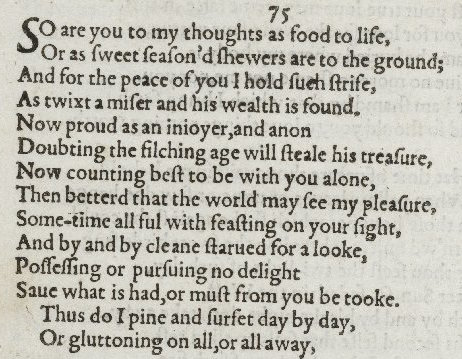
- Sonnet 75 in the 1609 Quarto
Q1
Q2
Q3
C
So are you to my thoughts as food to life,
Or as sweet-season’d showers are to the ground;
And for the peace of you I hold such strife
As ’twixt a miser and his wealth is found;
Now proud as an enjoyer, and anon
Doubting the filching age will steal his treasure;
Now counting best to be with you alone,
Then better’d that the world may see my pleasure:
Sometime all full with feasting on your sight,
And by and by clean starved for a look;
Possessing or pursuing no delight,
Save what is had or must from you be took.
Thus do I pine and surfeit day by day,
Or gluttoning on all, or all away.
—William Shakespeare
4
8
12
14

Sonnet 75 is one of 154 sonnets written by the English playwright and poet William Shakespeare. It is a member of the Fair Youth sequence, in which the poet expresses his love towards a young man.

== Synopsis ==
The poet expresses his complete pleasure in the presence of his beloved, but says that his devotion resembles that of a miser to his money, filled with anxiety combined with pleasure in his wealth.

== Structure ==
Sonnet 75 is an English or Shakespearean sonnet. The English sonnet has three quatrains, followed by a final rhyming couplet. It follows the typical rhyme scheme of the form, ABAB CDCD EFEF GG, and is composed in iambic pentameter, a type of poetic metre based on five pairs of metrically weak/strong syllabic positions. The 4th line exemplifies a regular iambic pentameter:

×     /   ×  / ×  /    ×   /     ×   / 
As 'twixt a miser and his wealth is found. (75.4)

The 6th line exhibits two common variations: an initial reversal and a final extrametrical syllable or feminine ending:

 /   ×     ×  /   ×   /    ×     /    ×   /  (×) 
Doubting the filching age will steal his treasure; (75.6)

/ = ictus, a metrically strong syllabic position. × = nonictus. (×) = extrametrical syllable.

Line 8 necessarily repeats the 6th line's feminine ending. Possible initial reversals also occur in lines 1, 2, 3, 9, 12, and 13; though these can be interpreted in other ways.

The meter demands a few variant pronunciations: in the 2nd line, "showers" functions as 1 syllable, and in the 10th line "starvèd" functions as 2.
