= Sonnet 81 =

« » Sonnet 81
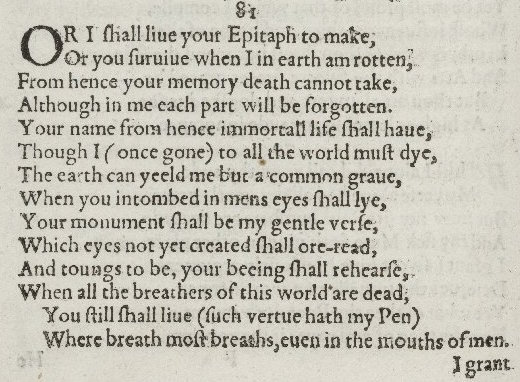
- Sonnet 81 in the 1609 Quarto
Q1
Q2
Q3
C
Or I shall live, your epitaph to make;
Or you survive, when I in earth am rotten;
From hence your memory death cannot take,
Although in me each part will be forgotten.
Your name from hence immortal life shall have,
Though I, once gone, to all the world must die;
The earth can yield me but a common grave,
When you entombed in men’s eyes shall lie.
Your monument shall be my gentle verse,
Which eyes not yet created shall o’er-read,
And tongues to be your being shall rehearse,
When all the breathers of this world are dead.
You still shall live, such virtue hath my pen,
Where breath most breathes, even in the mouths of men.
—William Shakespeare
4
8
12
14

Sonnet 81 is one of 154 sonnets written by William Shakespeare, and published in a quarto titled Shakespeare's Sonnets in 1609. It is a part of the Fair Youth series of sonnets, and the fourth sonnet of the Rival Poet series.

== Exegesis ==
The poet anticipates his own death, and includes the chance that the young man might die first. When the poet dies he will be soon forgotten, but when the young man dies he will live on as the subject of the poet's verse. This sonnet is distinct for its plain-spoken, simple collection of thoughtful statements. Most of the lines could be plucked out and joined at random to most other lines, and they would form complete and reasonable sentences. It is also distinct for its scarcity of metaphor.

The poem, beginning with the first two lines, rocks back and forth between thesis and antithesis: "I shall live, you shall die, you shall live, I shall die …" The poem is a reconsideration of the idea that poetry can immortalize the young man. The previous sonnets in the Rival Poet group have hinted at retaliation for the young man's disloyal preference for another poet, and in this poem retaliation becomes activated as the sonnet considers how the poet will write his friend's epitaph.

The poet will have a common grave, but the young man is provided with a tomb in the eyes of men (line 8). The tomb's monument is the sonnet itself, which, in the way of tombstones, will be read by generations in the future. Line 11 ("And tongues to be your being shall rehearse”) contains a morbid pun as it envisions the re-reading of an epitaph to be like a re-burial (“re-hearse"). The couplet has the young man being finally entombed in men's mouths "where breath most breathes”. That could be either an important final resting place, as words are breath, and life is breath. Or it could be insignificant as a breath will vanish quickly. That difference is going to be significant in the rest of the Rival Poet group.

== Structure ==
Sonnet 81 is an English or Shakespearean sonnet, which has three quatrains, followed by a final rhyming couplet. It follows the rhyme scheme ABAB CDCD EFEF GG and is composed in iambic pentameter, a metre of five feet per line, with two syllables in each foot accented weak/strong. Most of the lines are examples of regular iambic pentameter, including the 5th line:

  ×    /    ×    /    ×  /  ×   /     ×    / 
Your name from hence immortal life shall have, (81.5)

The 2nd and 4th lines feature a final extrametrical syllable or feminine ending:

×   /   ×   /    ×  /  ×   /    ×   / (×) 
Or you survive when I in earth am rotten; (81.2)

/ = ictus, a metrically strong syllabic position. × = nonictus. (×) = extrametrical syllable.

The meter calls for line 8's "entombèd" to be pronounced as 3 syllables, and line 14's "even" as 1.
