= Sonnet 76 =

« » Sonnet 76
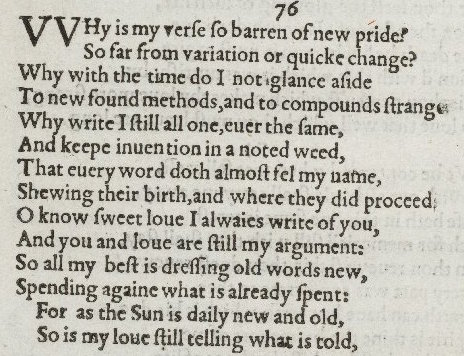
- Sonnet 76 of the 1609 Quarto
Q1
Q2
Q3
C
Why is my verse so barren of new pride,
So far from variation or quick change?
Why with the time do I not glance aside
To new-found methods and to compounds strange?
Why write I still all one, ever the same,
And keep invention in a noted weed,
That every word doth almost tell my name,
Showing their birth and where they did proceed?
O know, sweet love, I always write of you,
And you and love are still my argument:
So all my best is dressing old words new,
Spending again what is already spent:
For as the sun is daily new and old,
So is my love still telling what is told.
—William Shakespeare
4
8
12
14

Sonnet 76 is one of 154 sonnets published by the English playwright and poet William Shakespeare in 1609. It's a member of the Fair Youth sequence.

== Interpretation ==
This sonnet continues the theme of Sonnet 38 (38 sonnets ago), in which the sweet argument of the young man is predicted to inspire endless invention. Sonnets 76 and 38 share four key words: invention, sweet, write and argument.

This sonnet begins by asking why the poet's verse is lacking in new variations, why the poet doesn't look around at the verse of others and pick up some of the latest fashions, and why his verse is always dressed in a familiar style. The poem's reference to the writings of others anticipates the "Rival Poet" sequence (sonnets 78 to 86), which more explicitly considers other poets. The poem answers its own questions by pointing out that his best work is inspired by fidelity to the subject of the poems.

The sonnet seems to be sincerely self-denigrating about the poet's lack of variety, and lack of incorporating the latest fashions, but at the same time there is a sense that the self-effacing pose doesn't ring true. There is instead a self-asserting quality being implied: that when the poet compares himself with others in the first quatrain they appear to be mere followers of fashion, and (in the second quatrain) that his way of writing is a way for a writer to achieve a style that is distinct. There is also the assertion implied in the sestet that the poet requires fidelity to his subject in order to arrive at a proper style, as opposed to the fickle valuing of constantly changing fashions.

The poet's values, including fidelity to his subject, become dominant by the end of the sonnet, which is suggested metaphorically by the evolution of the meaning of the word love. It is first used (line 9) to refer to the young man ("sweet love"), then in the next line the meaning is changed, and love is something that parallels the young man ("you and love"). Then in the last line the change is complete so that love identifies the poet ("So is my love still telling what is told"). The image of the rising and setting sun (line 13) invites the initial assumption that it will refer to the young man as the sun, but that assumption is derailed when the last line indicates that the sun is a metaphor for the poet's love as expressed in verse.

== Structure ==
Sonnet 76 is an English or Shakespearean sonnet. The English sonnet has three quatrains, followed by a final rhyming couplet. It follows the rhyme scheme ABAB CDCD EFEF GG, and is composed in iambic pentameter, a type of metre based on five feet in each line, and each foot composed of a pair of syllables accented weak/strong. The 7th line is an example of a regular iambic pentameter:

  ×   /  ×  /    ×    /  ×    /   ×  / 
That every word doth almost tell my name, (76.7)

/ = ictus, a metrically strong syllabic position. × = nonictus.

The 1st line begins with a common variation, an initial reversal (a figure repeated several times in the sonnet), and ends with a less-frequent one, the rightward movement of the 4th ictus (resulting in a 4-position figure, × × / /, sometimes referred to as a minor ionic). The 2nd line repeats the minor ionic at the same point in the line:

  / ×   ×  /     ×  /  ×  ×   /    / 
Why is my verse so barren of new pride,

 ×  /    ×   / ×/  ×  ×   /      / 
So far from variation or quick change? (76.1-2)

== Notes ==
In the reference of line 4 to "new-found methods" found in the works of others, Shakespeare may be referring to Michael Drayton's sonnets that were republished with many variations beginning in 1599, and were advertised to have a "readiness to experiment".

The word weed in line 6 is an expression common in Shakespeare's works used to mean garments or dress. It occurs in that sense in many plays, including in The Two Gentleman of Verona, when the character Julia wants to dress herself as a young man, she says "fit me with such weeds/As may beseem some well reputed page."

"Noted weed" means familiar clothing. The Norton Shakespeare annotates "and keep invention in a noted weed" thus: And keep literary creativity in such familiar clothing. The Oxford English Dictionary's definition of weed is "an article of apparel; a garment", and is consistent with the theme of mending, re-using, etc. ("all my best is dressing old words new").

The "noted weed" of line 6 and the images of lines 7 and 8 seems to be echoed in a poem by Ben Jonson, published in the first pages of the First Folio that notes the distinctiveness and authenticity of Shakespeare's lines:

Look how the father's face
Lives in his issue, even so the race
Of Shakespeare's mind and manners brightly shines
In his well-turned, and true-filed lines

The suggestion that Shakespeare used the word weed in its contemporary connection with hemp is suggested by nobody. In 2001 some scientists from South Africa tested clay pipes that had been dug up over the years from various locations around Stratford-upon-Avon, tested them for chemicals and found no evidence that Shakespeare smoked clay pipes or used marijuana. This was not a notable study and is largely ignored.

== Interpretations ==
- Diana Rigg, for the 2002 compilation album, When Love Speaks (EMI Classics)

=== In music ===
- Poeterra recorded a pop rock version of Sonnet 76 on their album "When in Disgrace" (2014).
- Alfred Janson set the sonnet for SATB choir with Tenor/Baritone solo (2000).
