= Sonnet 94 =

« » Sonnet 94
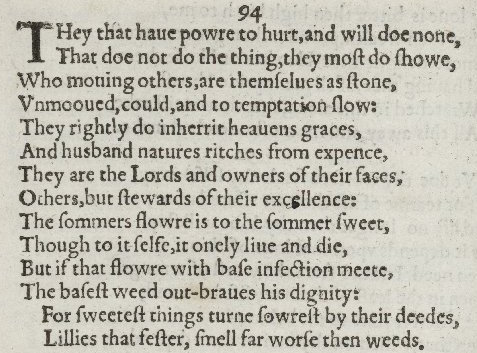
- Sonnet 94 in the 1609 Quarto
Q1
Q2
Q3
C
They that have power to hurt and will do none,
That do not do the thing they most do show,
Who, moving others, are themselves as stone,
Unmoved, cold and to temptation slow;
They rightly do inherit heaven’s graces
And husband nature’s riches from expense;
They are the lords and owners of their faces,
Others but stewards of their excellence.
The summer’s flower is to the summer sweet,
Though to itself it only live and die,
But if that flower with base infection meet,
The basest weed outbraves his dignity:
For sweetest things turn sourest by their deeds;
Lilies that fester smell far worse than weeds.
—William Shakespeare
4
8
12
14

Sonnet 94 is one of 154 sonnets written by the English playwright and poet William Shakespeare. It is a member of the Fair Youth sequence, in which the poet expresses his love towards a young man. The sonnet exalts those who are able to exert complete control over their own lives and actions.

== Structure ==
Sonnet 94 is an English or Shakespearean sonnet. The English sonnet has three quatrains, followed by a final rhyming couplet. It follows the typical rhyme scheme of the form, ABAB CDCD EFEF GG, and is composed in iambic pentameter, a type of poetic metre based on five pairs of metrically weak/strong syllabic positions. The 6th line exemplifies a regular iambic pentameter:

×    /  ×    / ×      /  ×    /  ×  / 
And husband nature's riches from expense; (94.6)

The 7th line exhibits two fairly common metrical variations: an initial reversal, and a final extrametrical syllable or feminine ending:

  /  ×     ×  /    ×   /  ×   /    ×    /(×) 
They are the lords and owners of their faces, (94.7)

/ = ictus, a metrically strong syllabic position. × = nonictus. (×) = extrametrical syllable.

Line 5 necessarily shares a feminine ending. Initial reversals also appear in lines 1, 8, and 14.

The meter demands a few variant pronunciations: line 1's "power" functions as 1 syllable, line 4's "unmovèd" as 3, and lines 9 and 11's "flower" as 1.

== Context ==
Sonnet 94 forms part of the "Fair Youth" sequence, where in sonnets 87-96 the Youth is seen as potentially fickle and unreliable. In 90-93 the Youth seems ready to abandon the poet and forget past promises; it is possible that some act or failure to act, or some statement, in the real-life circle of the Youth's admirers has convinced the poet that his beloved is one of those who moves others but is himself "as stone", giving a false impression of his intentions. Therefore, there are grounds for cautious optimism, or so the poet thinks, for the Youth may in fact remain faithful despite past suspicions. Yet there remains the thought that some evil will still destroy the poet's hopes, and optimism may prove unfounded.
