= Sonnet 80 =

« » Sonnet 80
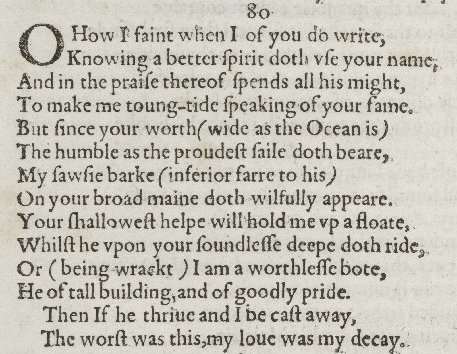
- Sonnet 80 in the 1609 Quarto
Q1
Q2
Q3
C
O, how I faint when I of you do write,
Knowing a better spirit doth use your name,
And in the praise thereof spends all his might,
To make me tongue-tied speaking of your fame.
But since your worth, wide as the ocean is,
The humble as the proudest sail doth bear,
My saucy bark, inferior far to his,
On your broad main doth wilfully appear.
Your shallowest help will hold me up afloat,
Whilst he upon your soundless deep doth ride;
Or, being wracked, I am a worthless boat,
He of tall building, and of goodly pride.
Then if he thrive and I be cast away,
The worst was this: my love was my decay.
—William Shakespeare
4
8
12
14

Sonnet 80 is one of 154 sonnets published by the English playwright and poet William Shakespeare in 1609. It is part of the Fair Youth sequence, and the third sonnet of the Rival Poet sequence.

== Exegesis ==
The poet's strategy in this sonnet is to present himself as humble and less talented than the rival poet, and to urge the young man to at least value the poet's love. The sonnet uses nautical metaphors. The poet begins with a conventional-seeming opening line, "O, how I faint when I of you do write", causing the reader to expect, in a manner like Petrarch, that a list of the young man's virtues will follow. Instead, it is revealed that the poet faints at the thought that there is a rival. The poet acknowledges that a superior poet is now using the young man's name, and is spending all his strength praising that name in order to tongue-tie the poet, which suggests the other poet does not have the substance of the young man as his primary focus.

The young man's worth is said by the poet to be as great as the ocean, and can bear both vessels—the humble and the proud. The poet portrays himself as a smaller ship that does "wilfully appear" (full of "Will"), while the other poet more resembles the large Spanish galleons (line 12), which calls to mind the English success with smaller, faster ships against the more lumbering Spanish Armada.

The young man is transformed during the sonnet from one who is at first vastly tolerant, to one who is then a shipwrecker, and one who might cast away a relationship (line 13). The first line of the couplet gives the young man the power to cause one to thrive and the other to be cast away, but the last line shows that is delusional, since the poet maintains his responsibility for his own decay, a word that Sonnet 79 confines to a lapse in poetic talent ("But now my gracious numbers are decayed").

== Structure ==
Sonnet 80 is an English or Shakespearean sonnet, which has three quatrains, followed by a final rhyming couplet. It follows the rhyme scheme ABAB CDCD EFEF GG and is composed in iambic pentameter, a metre of five feet per line, with two syllables in each foot accented weak/strong. Most of the lines are examples of regular iambic pentameter, including the 10th line:

  ×     /  × /   ×    /    ×    /    ×    / 
Whilst he upon your soundless deep doth ride; (80.10)

/ = ictus, a metrically strong syllabic position. × = nonictus.

The meter suggests a few variant pronunciations: the 2nd line's "spirit" functions as 1 syllable (possibly pronounced as spear't, sprite, sprit, or spurt), the 7th line's "inferior" as 3 syllables, and the 9th line's "shallowest" as 2.

The sonnet exhibits some metrical variations, for example, an initial reversal in the 2nd line:

  / ×   ×  /  ×    /     ×    /   ×    / 
Knowing a better spirit doth use your name, (80.2)

Reversals can also occur mid-line, as occurs in line 5; and some may be optional, as the possible initial reversals in lines 1 and 13. Also possible is the rightward movement of the first ictus (the resulting four-position figure, × × / /, is sometimes referred to as a minor ionic):

×   ×     /    /    ×    /  ×  / ×  / 
On your broad main doth wilfully appear. (80.8)
