= Sonnet 92 =

« » Sonnet 92
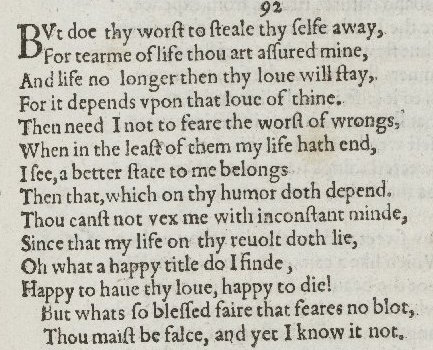
- Sonnet 92 in the 1609 Quarto
Q1
Q2
Q3
C
But do thy worst to steal thyself away,
For term of life thou art assured mine;
And life no longer than thy love will stay,
For it depends upon that love of thine.
Then need I not to fear the worst of wrongs,
When in the least of them my life hath end.
I see a better state to me belongs
Than that which on thy humour doth depend:
Thou canst not vex me with inconstant mind,
Since that my life on thy revolt doth lie.
O, what a happy title do I find,
Happy to have thy love, happy to die!
But what’s so blessed-fair that fears no blot?
Thou mayst be false, and yet I know it not.
—William Shakespeare
4
8
12
14

Sonnet 92 is one of 154 sonnets written by the English playwright and poet William Shakespeare. It is a member of the Fair Youth sequence, in which the poet expresses his love towards a young man.

== Structure ==
Sonnet 92 is an English or Shakespearean sonnet. The English sonnet has three quatrains, followed by a final rhyming couplet. It follows the typical rhyme scheme of the form, ABAB CDCD EFEF GG and is composed in iambic pentameter, a type of poetic metre based on five pairs of metrically weak/strong syllabic positions. The 5th line exemplifies a regular iambic pentameter:

  ×   /   ×  /   ×  /     ×  /    ×    / 
Then need I not to fear the worst of wrongs, (92.5)

/ = ictus, a metrically strong syllabic position. × = nonictus.

The 12th line exhibits both an initial and a mid-line reversal:

 /  ×  ×  /     ×  /     /  ×  ×  / 
Happy to have thy love, happy to die! (92.12)

The meter demands that both in line 2's "assurèd" and line 13's "blessèd", the -ed ending receives full syllabic status.

== Context in the sequence ==
Sonnet 92 follows directly on from sonnet 91, where the poet was happy in everything except that 'thou mayst take/ All this away'. But, sonnet 92 says, if the fair young man steals himself away, the poet's life will immediately end.

== Comments on idiom and vocabulary ==
'But do thy worst': in this psychologically tormented series of sonnets, the young man was urged to leave the poet in Sonnet 90, so that the poet would feel 'the worst of Fortune's might'. Burrow suggests the opening phrase of Sonnet 92 plays on 'do your best', but 'Do thy worst' was a common idiom ('Do thy worst, Satan' etc. sometimes used in sexual contexts: 'Do thy worst' says the young woman to her lover in a round by Edward Ravenscroft, 'Glad am I, glad am I...').

'steal thyself away': Sonnet 91 had considered various forms of valuable possessions enjoyed by various men, but claimed that 'having thee, of all men's pride I boast'. Surveying of all Elizabethan sonnets (using the LION database) reveals that the idea of theft is common in Shakespeare's sonnets (10 times), rare in other sonneteers. An alert and questioning reader might pause over the notion that the young man can steal himself: and this betrays a perhaps worrying sense of emotional entitlement in the poet.

In line 11, 'happy title': Shakespeare quite naturally uses 'title' in relation to kingship (most frequently in Part 3 of Henry VI). A kingly title that is perilous or subject to imminent change would be that of Macbeth (Act V scene ii: 'now does he feel his title hang loose about him'). Expressions like 'better state', 'revolt' and 'happy title' give a subdued figure of kingship. Back in sonnet 87, the poet was 'in sleep a king' (dreaming of the young man), 'but waking no such matter'.

'O', opening line 11, is a common exclamation on the sonnets (49 times, often at the very opening of a sonnet). Here, the suggestion or tonality is of empty happiness, 'O' as a nullity.

In the closing couplet of a sonnet where comparatives had played a significant role, the poet discovers another level of 'worst': falsehood in the young man of which the poet may actually be unaware. Sonnet 93 follows directly on this new possibility of distress.
