= Sonnet 91 =

« » Sonnet 91
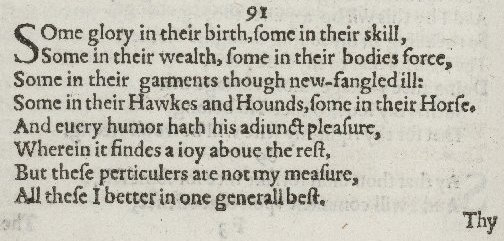
- The first two stanzas of Sonnet 91 in the 1609 Quarto
Q1
Q2
Q3
C
Some glory in their birth, some in their skill,
Some in their wealth, some in their body’s force;
Some in their garments, though new-fangled ill;
Some in their hawks and hounds, some in their horse;
And every humour hath his adjunct pleasure,
Wherein it finds a joy above the rest:
But these particulars are not my measure;
All these I better in one general best.
Thy love is better than high birth to me,
Richer than wealth, prouder than garments’ cost,
Of more delight than hawks or horses be;
And having thee, of all men’s pride I boast:
Wretched in this alone, that thou mayst take
All this away and me most wretched make.
—William Shakespeare
4
8
12
14

Sonnet 91 is one of 154 sonnets written by the English playwright and poet William Shakespeare. It is a member of the Fair Youth sequence, in which the poet expresses his love towards a young man.

== Paraphrase ==
Some people delight in their noble ancestry; some in their abilities; some in their wealth or strength; some in their hunting animals. But I don't take joy in any of these things because I have something even better: To me your love is better than noble ancestry, wealth, expensive clothes or hunting animals. And as long as I have you, I feel prouder than is anyone else. But I am also cursed in only a single thing: that if you stop loving me, I will become the most wretched person.

== Structure ==
Sonnet 91 is an English or Shakespearean sonnet. The English sonnet has three quatrains, followed by a final rhyming couplet. It follows the typical rhyme scheme of the form, ABAB CDCD EFEF GG, and is composed in iambic pentameter, a type of poetic metre based on five pairs of metrically weak/strong syllabic positions. The 11th line exemplifies a regular iambic pentameter:

×   /    × /      ×   /    ×    /  ×   / 
Of more delight than hawks and horses be; (91.11)

/ = ictus, a metrically strong syllabic position. × = nonictus.

The sonnet abounds with metrical variants. Lines 5 and 7 have a final extrametrical syllable or feminine ending. Line 2 exhibits both an initial and a mid-line reversal, two of at least nine such reversals in the poem.

 /   ×    ×    /       /   ×    ×    / ×     / 
Some in their wealth, some in their bodies' force, (91.2)

Both lines 8 and 9 may be scanned to exhibit the rightward movement of the third ictus (resulting in a four-position figure, × × / /, sometimes referred to as a minor ionic):

×     /   ×  /  ×  ×  /    /   ×   / 
All these I better in one general best.

  ×  /   ×   /  ×    ×   /    /     ×  / 
Thy love is better than high birth to me, (91.8-9)

== Interpretations ==
- Peter Barkworth, for the 2002 compilation album, When Love Speaks (EMI Classics)
