= Sonnet 96 =

« » Sonnet 96
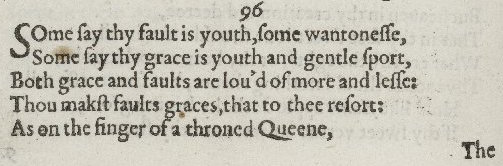
- The first five lines of Sonnet 96 in the 1609 Quarto
Q1
Q2
Q3
C
Some say thy fault is youth, some wantonness;
Some say thy grace is youth and gentle sport;
Both grace and faults are loved of more and less;
Thou mak’st faults graces, that to thee resort:
As on the finger of a throned queen
The basest jewel will be well esteemed,
So are those errors that in thee are seen
To truths translated, and for true things deemed.
How many lambs might the stern wolf betray
If like a lamb he could his looks translate?
How many gazers mightst thou lead away
If thou wouldst use the strength of all thy state?
But do not so; I love thee in such sort,
As thou being mine, mine is thy good report.
—William Shakespeare
4
8
12
14

Sonnet 96 is one of 154 sonnets written by the English playwright and poet William Shakespeare. It is a member of the Fair Youth sequence.

== Synopsis ==
The young man is praised for the charms found in both his faults and his good qualities; if he wanted to he could "lead away" or seduce even more of those who gaze at him. In the final couplet the speaker urges him: Do not, because since the young man's good reputation is in part based on his faults, if he goes too far those faults could be a danger to both of their reputations. The final couplet is identical to the final couplet of sonnet 36. Each couplet however has a different meaning according to the context of each sonnet.

== Structure ==
Sonnet 96 is an English or Shakespearean sonnet, which is composed of three quatrains, and a final rhyming couplet. The poem's lines follow the rhyme scheme ABAB CDCD EFEF GG, and are written in iambic pentameter: Five feet, each with two syllables accented weak/strong.

The 3rd line is an example of a regular iambic pentameter:

 ×     /   ×    /     ×    /    ×   /   ×    / 
Both grace and faults are lov'd of more and less: (96.3)

/ = ictus, a metrically strong syllabic position. × = nonictus.

The 9th line presents a case of metrical ambiguity. Probably the simplest scansion features only one metrical variation, a reversal of the accents in the third foot:

 ×   / ×  /     /      ×   ×    /   ×   / 
How many lambs might the stern wolf betray, (96.9)

However, the line may be read differently, depending upon the reader's interpretation. The line may be scanned with an initial reversal, and with the rightward movement of the third ictus (resulting in a four-position figure, × × / /, sometimes referred to as a minor ionic):

 /   × ×  /     ×      ×   /    /    ×  / 
How many lambs might the stern wolf betray, (96.9)

The meter calls for a few variant pronunciations: line 5's "thronèd" is two syllables, and line 14's "being" is one. In lines 8 and 10 "translated" and "translate" are both stressed on the second syllable.
