= Sonnet 98 =

« » Sonnet 98
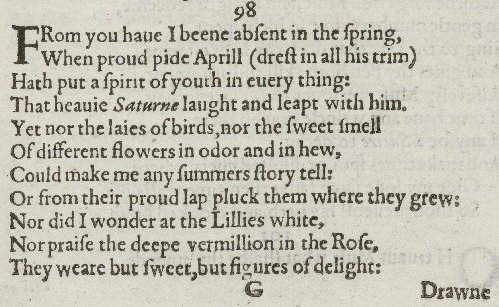
- The first eleven lines of Sonnet 98 in the 1609 Quarto
Q1
Q2
Q3
C
From you have I been absent in the spring,
When proud-pied April, dress’d in all his trim,
Hath put a spirit of youth in every thing,
That heavy Saturn laugh’d and leap’d with him.
Yet nor the lays of birds, nor the sweet smell
Of different flowers in odour and in hue,
Could make me any summer’s story tell,
Or from their proud lap pluck them where they grew:
Nor did I wonder at the lily’s white,
Nor praise the deep vermilion in the rose;
They were but sweet, but figures of delight,
Drawn after you, you pattern of all those.
Yet seem’d it winter still, and you away,
As with your shadow I with these did play.
—William Shakespeare
4
8
12
14

Sonnet 98 is one of 154 sonnets written by the English playwright and poet William Shakespeare. It is a member of the Fair Youth sequence, in which the persona expresses his love towards a young man. It is the second of a group of three sonnets (97 to 99) to treat a separation of the speaker from his beloved.

== Paraphrase ==
We were apart during the spring, when everything feels young, even aged Saturn; however, none of the beauty I saw around me could bring me into sympathy with my surroundings. I could not admire the lily or the rose, since these were to me only images of you. Thus, it still seemed winter to me, since you were away.

== Structure ==
Sonnet 98 is an English or Shakespearean sonnet. The English sonnet has three quatrains, followed by a final rhyming couplet. It follows the typical rhyme scheme of the form, ABAB CDCD EFEF GG, and is composed in iambic pentameter, a type of poetic metre based on five pairs of metrically weak/strong syllabic positions. The 4th line exemplifies a regular iambic pentameter:

  ×   /  ×  / ×    /      ×    /      ×    / 
That heavy Saturn laugh'd and leap'd with him. (98.4)

/ = ictus, a metrically strong syllabic position. × = nonictus.

The 12th line potentially exhibits two metrical variations: first, an initial reversal, second, the rightward movement of the fourth ictus (resulting in a four-position figure, × × / /, sometimes referred to as a minor ionic):

  /   ×  ×   /    ×   /  ×   ×  /     / 
Drawn after you, you pattern of all those. (98.12)

The same variations, in the same positions, are also potentially present in line 5. However, if the repetition of the word "nor" draws special emphasis from the reader, both positions would be affected, resulting in the somewhat more regular:

 ×   /    ×  /   ×   /     /    ×   ×     / 
Yet nor the lays of birds nor the sweet smell (98.5)

The meter demands a few variant pronunciations: line 3's "spirit" is one syllable (possibly pronounced as spear't, sprite, sprit, or spurt), line 6's "different" is two syllables and "flowers" is one.

== Source and analysis ==
As Sidney Lee notes, this poem, like most Renaissance sonnets on similar themes, derives ultimately from Petrarch's sonnet 42; he cites examples from Surrey and Sidney. Edward Dowden notes a resemblance to Spenser's Amoretti 64. G. Wilson Knight connects the rose and lily of this poem to what he sees as a pattern of flower symbolism in the cycle.
