= Sonnet 90 =

« » Sonnet 90
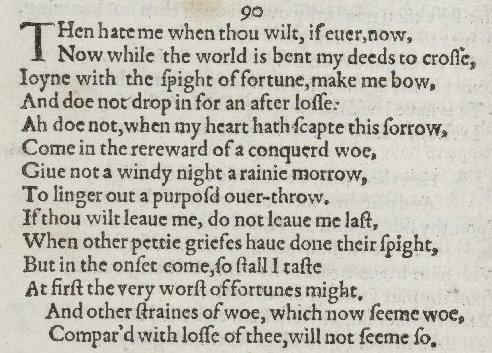
- Sonnet 90 in the 1609 Quarto
Q1
Q2
Q3
C
Then hate me when thou wilt; if ever, now;
Now, while the world is bent my deeds to cross,
Join with the spite of fortune, make me bow,
And do not drop in for an after-loss:
Ah, do not, when my heart hath ’scap’d this sorrow,
Come in the rearward of a conquer’d woe;
Give not a windy night a rainy morrow,
To linger out a purpos’d overthrow.
If thou wilt leave me, do not leave me last,
When other petty griefs have done their spite,
But in the onset come: so shall I taste
At first the very worst of fortune’s might;
And other strains of woe, which now seem woe,
Compar’d with loss of thee will not seem so.
—William Shakespeare
4
8
12
14

Sonnet 90 is one of 154 sonnets written by the English playwright and poet William Shakespeare. It is a member of the Fair Youth sequence, in which the poet expresses his love towards a young man.

== Synopsis ==
The sonnet continues the themes of the breakdown of the relationship between the youth and the poet. The poet suggests that the youth should reject him now that everyone seems to be against him. The poet exhorts the youth not to wait to reject him until after these other, less important, sorrows have passed. At least if he is rejected now, his other problems will pale into insignificance.

== Structure ==
Sonnet 90 is an English or Shakespearean sonnet. The English sonnet has three quatrains, followed by a final rhyming couplet. It follows the typical rhyme scheme of the form, ABAB CDCD EFEF GG, and is composed in iambic pentameter, a type of poetic metre based on five pairs of metrically weak/strong syllabic positions. The 10th line exemplifies a regular iambic pentameter:

  ×  /  ×   /  ×   /     ×    /     ×     / 
When other petty griefs have done their spite, (90.10)

Lines 5 and 7 have a final extrametrical syllable or feminine ending. Line 7 may also be read as exhibiting another common metrical variation, the initial reversal:

 /    ×  ×  /  ×  /    ×  /  ×  / (×) 
Give not a windy night a rainy morrow, (90.7)

/ = ictus, a metrically strong syllabic position. × = nonictus. (×) = extrametrical syllable.

Initial reversals also occur in lines 3 and 6, and potentially 2. A potential mid-line reversal occurs in line 11 ("so shall").
