= Sonnet 95 =

« » Sonnet 95
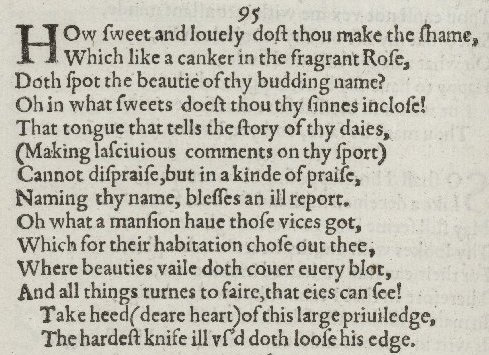
- Sonnet 95 in the 1609 Quarto
Q1
Q2
Q3
C
How sweet and lovely dost thou make the shame
Which, like a canker in the fragrant rose,
Doth spot the beauty of thy budding name!
O, in what sweets dost thou thy sins inclose!
That tongue that tells the story of thy days,
Making lascivious comments on thy sport,
Cannot dispraise but in a kind of praise;
Naming thy name blesses an ill report.
O, what a mansion have those vices got
Which for their habitation chose out thee,
Where beauty’s veil doth cover every blot
And all things turn to fair that eyes can see!
Take heed, dear heart, of this large privilege;
The hardest knife ill us’d doth lose his edge.
—William Shakespeare
4
8
12
14

Sonnet 95 is one of 154 sonnets written by the English playwright and poet William Shakespeare. It is a member of the Fair Youth sequence, in which the poet expresses his love towards a young man.

== Synopsis ==
The youth's dissolute behaviour is making corruption seem beautiful. Even descriptions of the youth's behaviour make it beautiful. The youth's beauty covers the blots of vice, but everything eventually loses its qualities if it is misused.

== Structure ==
Sonnet 95 is an English or Shakespearean sonnet. The English sonnet has three quatrains, followed by a final rhyming couplet. It follows the typical rhyme scheme of the form, ABAB CDCD EFEF GG, and is composed in iambic pentameter, a type of poetic metre based on five pairs of metrically weak/strong syllabic positions. The 11th line exemplifies a regular iambic pentameter:

  ×    /   ×    /    ×    / ×  /   ×   / 
Where beauty's veil doth cover every blot (95.11)

/ = ictus, a metrically strong syllabic position. × = nonictus.

The 8th line has both an initial and a mid-line reversal:

 / ×     ×  /     /  ×  ×  /    × / 
Naming thy name blesses an ill report. (95.8)

Initial reversals are also present in lines 6 and 10, and potentially in lines 2, 4, and 9.

The meter demands line 6's "lascivious" to function as three syllables.
