= Sonnet 79 =

« » Sonnet 79
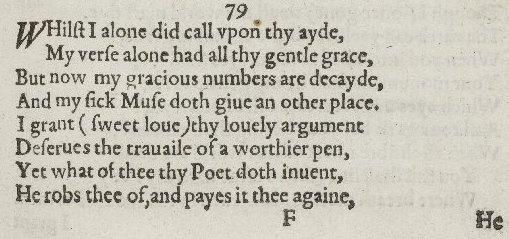
- The first two stanzas of Sonnet 79 in the 1609 Quarto
Q1
Q2
Q3
C
Whilst I alone did call upon thy aid
My verse alone had all thy gentle grace;
But now my gracious numbers are decayed,
And my sick Muse doth give another place.
I grant, sweet love, thy lovely argument
Deserves the travail of a worthier pen;
Yet what of thee thy poet doth invent
He robs thee of, and pays it thee again;
He lends thee virtue, and he stole that word
From thy behavior; beauty doth he give,
And found it in thy cheek; he can afford
No praise to thee, but what in thee doth live:
Then thank him not for that which he doth say,
Since what he owes thee, thou thyself dost pay.
—William Shakespeare
4
8
12
14

Sonnet 79 is one of 154 sonnets published by the English playwright and poet William Shakespeare in 1609. It is part of the Fair Youth sequence, and the second sonnet of the Rival Poet sequence.

== Exegesis ==
This sonnet continues the discussion of the previous sonnet, Sonnet 78, regarding other poets who also write poems dedicated to the fair youth. Sonnet 79 argues that the other poet deserves no thanks, because the quality of his writing derives from the quality of his subject. The poet (line 2) claims that earlier he had exclusively had the young man's patronage, or that his verse had exclusively been devoted to the young man's virtue or honor. But now those of his verses that benefited from the young man's grace ("gracious numbers"), are "decayed" because the youth's favors are being spread out and because the muse is not healthy ("sick muse"), which is a strange description considering the first line of Sonnet 78: "So oft have I invoked thee for my Muse".

The muse (line 4) makes room for another poet, or another muse. When the speaker desperately and unexpectedly refers (line 7) to the rival poet as "thy poet", it is clear that loyalties have shifted. The sestet turns the rival poet's effort to find appropriate metaphors into a materialistic endeavor ("He robs thee … he lends … he stole …") regarding merely skin-deep attractiveness ("found it in thy cheek”). The poet suggests a poem by a rival that has little to add, but proclaims the youth is as virtuous as his virtue, his cheek is as lovely as his cheek, and requires no “thanks".

== Structure ==
Sonnet 79 is an English or Shakespearean sonnet, which has three quatrains, followed by a final rhyming couplet. It follows the rhyme scheme ABAB CDCD EFEF GG, and is composed in iambic pentameter, a metre of five feet per line, with two syllables in each foot accented weak/strong. Most of the lines are examples of regular iambic pentameter, including the 2nd line:

 ×   /    ×  /  ×   /   ×   /  ×    / 
My verse alone had all thy gentle grace; (79.2)

/ = ictus, a metrically strong syllabic position. × = nonictus.

The 4th line may be scanned with a rightward movement of the first ictus (the resulting four-position figure, × × / /, is sometimes referred to as a minor ionic):

×    ×  /    /    ×    /    × / ×    / 
And my sick Muse doth give another place. (79.4)

The meter calls for a 2-syllable pronunciation of "worthier" in the 6th line.
