= Sonnet 100 =

« » Sonnet 100
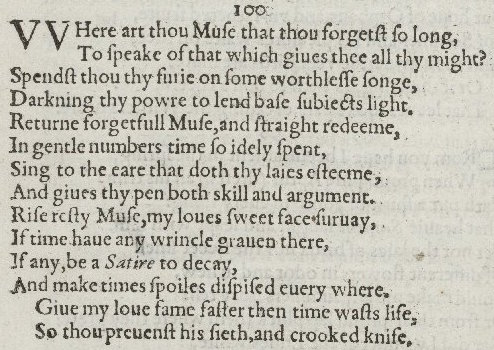
- Sonnet 100 in the 1609 Quarto
Q1
Q2
Q3
C
Where art thou, Muse, that thou forget’st so long
To speak of that which gives thee all thy might?
Spend’st thou thy fury on some worthless song,
Dark’ning thy power to lend base subjects light?
Return, forgetful Muse, and straight redeem
In gentle numbers time so idly spent;
Sing to the ear that doth thy lays esteem
And gives thy pen both skill and argument.
Rise, resty Muse, my love’s sweet face survey,
If Time have any wrinkle graven there;
If any, be a satire to decay,
And make Time’s spoils despised every where.
Give my love fame faster than Time wastes life;
So thou prevent’st his scythe and crooked knife.
—William Shakespeare
4
8
12
14

Sonnet 100 is one of 154 sonnets written by the English playwright and poet William Shakespeare. It is a member of the Fair Youth sequence, in which the poet expresses his love towards a young man.

== Structure ==
Sonnet 100 is an English or Shakespearean sonnet. The English sonnet has three quatrains, followed by a final rhyming couplet. It follows the typical rhyme scheme of the form ABAB CDCD EFEF GG and is composed in iambic pentameter, a type of poetic metre based on five pairs of metrically weak/strong syllabic positions. The 5th line exemplifies a regular iambic pentameter:

 × /     ×  /  ×   /    ×      /      × / 
Return, forgetful Muse, and straight redeem (100.5)

/ = ictus, a metrically strong syllabic position. × = nonictus.

The 3rd line exhibits a common metrical variant, the initial reversal, which is also present in lines 4, 7, and potentially 9:

  /        ×    ×  / × /   ×    /    ×    / 
Spend'st thou thy fury on some worthless song, (100.3)

The 13th line generates a somewhat complex rhythm, incorporating an initial and a mid-line reversal, as well as two non-ictic stresses ("love" and "wastes"):

  /   ×  ×    /    /  ×    ×   /    ×      / 
Give my love fame faster than Time wastes life; (100.13)
