= Rival Poet =

Poetic persona in Shakespeare's sonnets

The Rival Poet is one of several characters, either fictional or real persons, featured in William Shakespeare's sonnets. The sonnets most commonly identified as the Rival Poet group exist within the Fair Youth group in sonnets 78–86. Several theories about these characters, the Rival Poet included, have been expounded, and scholarly debate continues to put forward both conflicting and compelling arguments. In the context of these theories, the speaker of the poem sees the Rival Poet as a competitor for fame, wealth and patronage.

== Possible candidates ==
Among others, George Chapman, Christopher Marlowe, Edmund Spenser, Samuel Daniel, Michael Drayton, Barnabe Barnes, Gervase Markham, and Richard Barnfield have been proposed as identities for the Rival Poet.

=== George Chapman ===
In the 1590s Chapman was active as a poet and playwright and he had begun to be prominent as a translator of Homer. Scholars speculate that Shakespeare was familiar with his work, having read part of his translation of the Iliad for his own Troilus and Cressida, a dramatic reworking of Chaucer's epic poem. Chapman wrote Ovid's Banquet Of Sense, a metaphysical poem seen as a response to the erotic Venus and Adonis, which incidentally features Shakespeare's most quoted poet, Ovid. In Shakespeare and the Rival Poet, Arthur Acheson conjectured that Chapman's erotic poems were written with a view to gaining Southampton's patronage. The moral tone of Ovid's Banquet of Sense eschews the amatory tone of Shakespeare's, and seeks to instill spiritual seriousness in a work that takes the five senses as its Conceit. Chapman's patrons also moved in the same circles as Shakespeare's; thus Shakespeare may have felt insecure about the stability of his own income versus a talented rival. Chapman was both then and now regarded as being particularly erudite, whereas, as Ben Jonson writes, Shakespeare had "small Latine and lesse Greeke".

=== Christopher Marlowe ===
Marlowe was more highly regarded as a dramatist than a poet, his chief poetical work, Hero and Leander, remaining incomplete at the time of his death (it was subsequently completed by Chapman). Due to Marlowe's relatively small dramatic output compared with Shakespeare, it is unlikely that he would have been the subject of Shakespeare's sonnets, i.e. considered a serious rival. By the time Shakespeare began his works Marlowe was a well-established playwright but the two had a very important artistic relationship. In his book The Genius of Shakespeare, Jonathan Bate notes "the two-way traffic between Marlowe and Shakespeare until the latter's death". Shakespeare strove to outdo Marlowe and through their artistic competition they would push one another to higher achievements in dramatic literature. This competition could have also motivated the Rival Poet sonnets.

=== Edmund Spenser ===
In his essay "Shakespeare's Rival Poet", Prof. Henry David Gray makes a strong case for Edmund Spenser (the unofficial poet laureate of the day), as the poet referred to in Sonnet 86.

=== Multiple poets ===
It has also been suggested that the Rival Poet is an amalgam of several of Shakespeare's contemporaries instead of a single person. This is indicated by the fluctuation between singular and plural addresses of the rival(s) in the sonnet sequence. In Sonnet 78 the Speaker refers to other poets who have gained inspiration from the Fair Youth but in 79 the Speaker is only concerned with one "he", a potentially "worthier pen". Sonnet 80 continues the singular reference but by 82 the Speaker reverts to the plural "writers". In 83 he refers to "both your poets" indicating that the Speaker is one poet and the Rival is the other. According to MacDonald P. Jackson, Sonnet 86 is "the most powerful of the group [and] the most detailed in its characterization of one specific Rival Poet". While arguably the most powerful of this sonnet grouping, one cannot neglect the oscillation between singular and plural seen throughout the group as a whole. This discrepancy makes it difficult to isolate one specific poet to claim the title of Rival.

The Speaker's attitude towards the Rival is also difficult to pinpoint. Some critics, such as R. Gittings, believe that much of the Poet's comments on his rival should be read as ironic or satiric. Jackson maintains that the Poet's feelings toward the Rival shift between varying degrees of admiration and criticism. This also indicates a multitude of rivals. As the Poet's confidence ebbs and flows along with his impression of his rival(s), the identity of the rival(s) also fluctuates.

A final defence for the Multiple Rivals Theory relies on a dating of the Rival Poet sonnets between 1598–1600. While this frame of reference has support, so do other possible dates and there will always be controversy regarding dating of individual sonnets. However, if it is assumed that this grouping was published between 1598 and 1600, a publication by Francis Meres comes into play. In 1598, Meres published Palladis Tamia; Wits Treasury with a chapter titled "A Comparative Discourse of our English Poets with the Greek, Latin, and Italian Poets" in which he documents the critical esteem of the poets of the day. Shakespeare received high praise for his dramatic work but Marlowe and Chapman were deemed England's "two excellent poets". This, according to Jackson, "must surely have helped provoke the Rival Poet series".
