= Sonnet 138 =

« » Sonnet 138
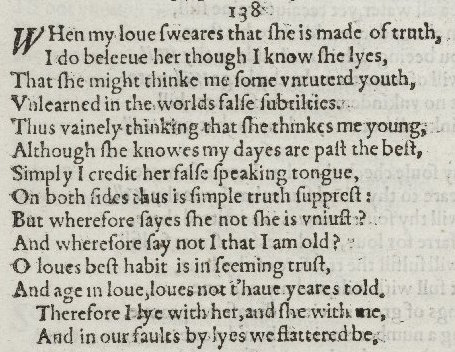
- Sonnet 138 in the 1609 Quarto
Q1
Q2
Q3
C
When my love swears that she is made of truth,
I do believe her, though I know she lies,
That she might think me some untutor’d youth,
Unlearned in the world’s false subtleties.
Thus vainly thinking that she thinks me young,
Although she knows my days are past the best,
Simply I credit her false-speaking tongue:
On both sides thus is simple truth suppress’d.
But wherefore says she not she is unjust?
And wherefore say not I that I am old?
O, love’s best habit is in seeming trust,
And age in love loves not to have years told:
Therefore I lie with her and she with me,
And in our faults by lies we flatter’d be.
—William Shakespeare
4
8
12
14

Sonnet 138 is one of the most famous of William Shakespeare's sonnets. Making use of frequent puns ("lie" and "lie" being the most obvious), it shows an understanding of the nature of truth and flattery in romantic relationships. The poem has also been argued to be biographical: many scholars have suggested Shakespeare used the poem to discuss his frustrating relationship with the Dark Lady, a frequent subject of many of the sonnets. (To note, the Dark Lady was definitely not Shakespeare's wife, Anne Hathaway.) The poem emphasizes the effects of age and the associated deterioration of beauty, and its effect on a sexual or romantic relationship.

== Paraphrase ==
Sonnet 138 begins with the speaker discussing how his love speaks word of truth, but the next line states "I do believe her, though I know she lies." This sets the tone for the rest of the sonnet because he knows that his lover is lying. He chooses to deny it and accept her lie. The line "That she might think me some untutored youth" points to the speaker being self-conscious about his age. He stresses his awareness that his best days are behind him; a truth that his lover knows but ignores. He understands that both are lying to each other for the sake of their relationship to live. When the speaker states, "Simply I credit her false-speaking tongue" he is accepting her lies. The speaker and his lover are hiding their transgression by not bringing to light the issue that they are insecure about, i.e., "Therefore I lie with her and she with me, and in our faults by lies we flattered be." At the end of the sonnet, the speaker and his lover accept their flaws.

== Structure ==
Sonnet 138 is an English or Shakespearean sonnet. The English sonnet has three quatrains, followed by a final rhyming couplet. It follows the typical rhyme scheme of the form abab cdcd efef gg and is composed in iambic pentameter, a type of poetic metre based on five pairs of metrically weak/strong syllabic positions. The 6th line exemplifies a regular iambic pentameter:

×   /      ×   /    ×  /   ×    /     ×  / 
Although she knows my days are past the best, (138.6)

/ = ictus, a metrically strong syllabic position. × = nonictus.

The poem is quite regular metrically. Ironically, line 7, beginning "simply" may be the most metrically complex: it begins with a common metrical variation, the initial reversal, and features (potentially) a rightward movement of the third ictus (resulting in a four-position figure, × × / /, sometimes referred to as a minor ionic):

 /   × ×   / ×   ×   /      /  ×    / 
Simply I credit her false-speaking tongue: (138.7)

An initial reversal is potentially present in line 13, and a minor ionic in line 1; however, the frequent emphasis of pronouns in this poem may argue against the latter variation.

The meter demands that line 4's "unlearnèd" be pronounced with three syllables.

== Context ==
=== The Passionate Pilgrim ===
Sonnet 138 is one of twenty sonnets published in The Passionate Pilgrim (Dark Lady) collection (1599) by Jaggard. In Shakespeare's Sonnets, Carl D. Atkins stresses that although the collection title page reads "By W. Shakespeare", it features a number of poems known to belong to other authors. "Commentators have debated", he states, "whether the version of Sonnet 138 in the Passionate Pilgrim represents an early draft by Shakespeare or a poor memorial reconstruction by someone who read the version later printed in the Quarto (or some other draft)" (340). John Roe's analysis in the Cambridge collection of Shakespeare's poetry, The Poems, adds a layer of mystery to the sonnet authorship when he mentions the canceled title page of Jaggard's 1612 edition, which bears Heywood's name (58).

The Passionate Pilgrim went through two separate printings during 1599. Sonnet 138 is the first poem in The Passionate Pilgrim, followed thereafter by Shakespeare's Sonnet 144. The poem, as it appeared in 1599, with substantive differences from the 1609 Quarto in italics:

When my love swears that she is made of truth,
I do believe her, though I know she lies,
That she might think me some untutor'd youth,
Unskilful in the world's false forgeries.
Thus vainly thinking that she thinks me young,
Although I know my years be past the best,
I smiling credit her false-speaking tongue,
Outfacing faults in love with love's ill rest.
But wherefore says my love that she is young?
And wherefore say not I that I am old?
O love's best habit is a flattering tongue,
And age, in love, loves not to have years told.
Therefore I'll lie with love, and love with me,
Since that our faults in love thus smother'd be.

=== Similar sonnets ===
The sonnet talks about how lies do not hurt when their purpose is to protect lovers' feelings and preserve relationships. In the sonnet, the speaker knows that his lover is lying about his age, but decides not to make much ado about nothing because he knows her act is dictated by love and concern. The irony is that the speaker is himself aware of the lie while hiding a lie of his own. Gerald Massey's Shakespeare's Sonnets Never Before Interpreted argues that this type of irony is a characteristic of a number of Shakespearean sonnets, particularly Sonnet 96, Sonnet 131, Sonnet 137, Sonnet 142, and Sonnet 147 (357).

== The Dark Lady ==
Sonnet 138 is a part of a series of poems written about Shakespeare's dark lady. They describe a woman who has dark hair and dark eyes. She diverges from the Petrarchan norm. "Golden locks" and "florid cheeks" were fashionable in that day, but Shakespeare's lady does not bear those traits. The lady is shown as being both fair and foul, and both kind and unkind. Alice F. Moore feels that within these later sonnets the poet is equally as dark as the lady. As the speaker reveals the mistress in her "foulness" and "deceit", he consequently reveals himself. These sonnets are shadowed by the speakers own self-hatred and anger. However, Joel Fineman believes that the biggest difference between series of the dark lady and the other series of sonnets featuring the young man is that those about the dark lady use a formula of lusty misogyny that is clearly Shakespearean. Throughout the sonnets, and especially sonnet 138, the lady "comes to occupy this peculiarly charged erotic place ("therefore I lie with her, and she with me,/And in our faults by lies we flattered be").

The sonnets addressed to the dark lady usually relate the lady with "a disjunction occasioned by verbal duplicity," ("When my love swears that she is made of truth,/I do believe her, though I know she lies"). The language in the dark lady sonnets is some that "one is forced to hear— to hear, that is, as language— functions as a supplementary and confirming, not a disavowing, gloss on what the poet has to say". They "conceal praise under the guise of disparagement (Kambascovic-Sawers p. 293). A.L. Rowse believes that the sonnet takes us further into Shakespeare's relationship with the lady. The relationship is both "purely sexual" and "utterly unromantic". However, it can also be said that the speaker is not attracted to the woman because of her "physical, intellectual, or moral excellence". Instead, the attraction is portrayed as being "self-generated, with no basis in 'reality'.

Rowse feels that the woman discussed in the sonnet can be identified as the mistress, Emilia. Shakespeare is six years older, and is thus highly conscious of his age. Underneath all the hyprocrisies there is Shakespeare's "honest candour." In Shakespeare's Sonnets: The Problems Solved, A. L. Rowse notes that Sonnet 138 shows the "uncompromising realism with which he [Shakespeare] describes it all: it has been said -- rightly-- that there is no woman like Shakespeare's in all the sonnet-literature of the Renaissance. Most of them are abstractions or wraiths; this one is of flesh and blood".

== Themes and motifs ==
Valerie Traub presents the idea that many sonnets follow a Judeo-Christian idea of procreation as "justification" for heterosexuality. Shakespeare explores more sensual and even explicit ideas in the sonnets that challenge these ideals. Though Sonnet 138 does not vastly differ from this tradition as Shakespeare's sonnets to the young boy this does fall into this contradictory tradition. Here there Shakespeare references her truth and lies rather than her sensual body showing that he is differing from Christian traditions. Joel Fineman speaks on a similar topic when referencing Shakespeare. "On both sides thus is simple truth suppress'd." Fineman states, "his desire is imposed on him, not by God or by Nature, but by poetry itself." Fineman is explaining that Shakespeare is not only challenging Christianity he is examining the forms and ideas of poetry themselves. Shakespeare's emphasis on truth takes away from his emphasis on procreation. J. Bunselmeyer takes it even further and discusses that Shakespeare's puns here begin to negate not only the traditional ideas of Christianity but also the words that are being presented. This contradiction plays on Fineman's idea of the form of poetry.

== Exegesis ==
Sonnet 138 unveils a paradox that underlines the speaker's personal struggle to come to terms with issues of deceit and trust in love. The sonnet's tone shifts from a recognition of his lover's lie about her age to developing a sense of trust in exchanging the lie. The lady is portrayed as someone insecure about her age in her attempt to defy time and win compassion of her younger lover. The element of irony in this exchange is his reference to her knowledge that his age is already beyond youth. Author of Shakespeare's Sonnets Never Before Interpreted, Gerald Massey, describes the sonnet's irony as "one of a smiling kind" (337).

The tone shift highlights the power of love in interpolating mutual exchange of harmonious moments even at the cost of such negative values as lying. The interpolation process prompts him to transcend his earlier cynical perception of deceit to capture a rather more meaningful feeling, i.e. their lying cycle is but a moment of love performance. Using wordplay in "Therefore I lie with her, and she with me" suggests that they are not lying at each other but with each other. The sonnet concludes with this reconciling image to release the speaker from transgressing his lover's age insecurity. In The Social Context of Nonverbal Behavior, the writers suggest that the speaker's decision could be his way of preserving "his image of his love as a truthful person" (373). This, however, does not exempt him from taking advantage of the benefits of sustaining the relationship.

Edward A. Snow's "Loves of Comfort and Despair: A Reading of Shakespeare's Sonnet 138" presents a critical analysis of the sonnet in light of other Shakespearean works.

=== Quatrain 1 ===
Lines 1 and 2 of Shakespeare's Sonnet 138 present a paradox where the obsessed lover is blind to what he can clearly see. Line 2 reveals that the speaker is aware of his delusion, possibly because of the word "swears" in line 1. Swearing, according to editor Stephen Booth, means there is a reason for disbelief; consequently, the statement incriminates itself. Alice F. Moore also concurs with the writing of Stephen Booth in her own commentary on Sonnet 138, also proclaiming the relationship between the two lovers as one of mutual dishonesty. For Moore, line 2 highlights an internal division of the speaker because he knows that the lady lies, but he, even knowing this, chooses to believe her. The speaker clearly acknowledges his lady's lies in line 2, and he acknowledges his decision to believe them. Both lines 3 and 4 give reason for the speaker's beliefs concerning his and his lover's lies. He wants to appear younger, while she wants to think that she is with a more youthful lover. However, the editor, Carl D. Atkins, approaches the first quatrain with a slightly different take, believing the word "lies" in line 2 to be nothing more than a set-up for the pun in the ending couplet, using the word "lies" to mean "sleep with" instead of "falsehoods". He also has a slight twist about who lies to whom, claiming that the lady lies to the speaker about her faithfulness, but he does not lie to her, only to himself, imagining that she believes him to be an "untutored youth".

=== Quatrain 2 ===
In the second quatrain, specifically in lines 5 and 6, the speaker declares he is aware that she knows he is no longer young. Beginning line 5 with the words "Thus vainly" effectively negates the second half of the line, implying that the lady does not actually believe in the speaker's youth. The same can be said for line 7, with the second part of the line clearly contradicting the beginning. According to Moore, the confusing contradictions within these lines are intended to display, and help the reader to feel, the "schizophrenia" of both the poem and the two lovebirds. Booth's writing agrees with Moore; lines 5 and 6 parallel the inconsistencies that the speaker discusses in line 2. Booth's interpretation suggests that the lady struggles to believe that she actually believes the lies that she pretends to believe. Boothe says line 7 simply shows line 8 as a truth "thus, we are both liars, she in pretending faithfulness and I in pretending youth", emphasizing the mutuality of the relationship. It reiterates their mutual deception and recognition of said deception, believing all that they hear from each other and all that they tell to each other.

=== Quatrain 3 ===
In line 9, the word "unjust" is taken by Atkins to mean either "dishonest" or "unfaithful"; the editor leans toward the second option because it is in keeping with the rest of his interpretation, but it is clear that the word refers to some "falseness in matters of the heart". In line 13, the term "lie with" also furthers Atkins's argument for an elaborate pun, declaring that the speaker lies with the mistress rather than to her. Also in lines 11 and 12, much is debated over the beginning "O" of line 11. Moore interprets this interjection as impatience or sarcasm, possibly a "reason or excuse hastily tossed off." However, author Helen Vendler views it as the beginnings of proverbial wisdom; the "O" is actually an answer to a question. Both lines 11 and 12 are in proverb form, but Vendler believes the proverbs to reference the speaker, as opposed to his lady.

=== Couplet ===
The ending couplet provides, according to Moore, an interesting twist when "deception and love making become one: to lie is to lie with" However, Vendler has a slightly different take on the poem as a whole in response to the final volta. She notes that the pronouns "I" and "she" share a mutual verb, becoming "we" with "our" shared faults. The end of the poem shows the final progression of the lovers' relationship, beginning with anger, then suppressed anger, followed by game playing, then the realization of the absurdity of truthfulness, finally ending with the admission of flattery when each lover suppresses frank speech in order to lie to and with each other. Booth also recognizes the significance of the mutual pronouns, with line 13 reiterating lies as necessary for a cooperative relationship, but his conclusion from the closing lines of the poem varies slightly from Vendler's. For Booth, line 14 is not a realization of the lovers situation, but it is a reason for the speaker's attitude throughout the poem, particularly that of "cynicism, bitterness, and despair".

== Recordings ==
- Richard Johnson, for the 2002 compilation album, When Love Speaks (EMI)
- Paul Kelly, for the 2016 album, Seven Sonnets & a Song
- Ane Brun, for the 2016 single, Sonnet 138: When My Love Swears That He Is Made Of Truth
