= Sonnet 144 =

« » Sonnet 144
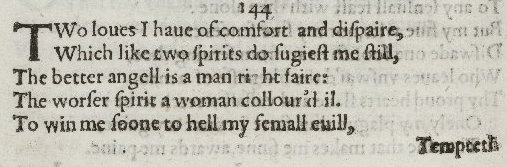
- The first five lines of Sonnet 144 in the 1609 Quarto
Q1
Q2
Q3
C
Two loves I have of comfort and despair,
Which like two spirits do suggest me still:
The better angel is a man right fair,
The worser spirit a woman colour’d ill.
To win me soon to hell, my female evil
Tempteth my better angel from my side,
And would corrupt my saint to be a devil,
Wooing his purity with her foul pride.
And whether that my angel be turn’d fiend
Suspect I may, yet not directly tell;
But being both from me, both to each friend,
I guess one angel in another’s hell:
Yet this shall I ne’er know, but live in doubt,
Till my bad angel fire my good one out.
—William Shakespeare
4
8
12
14

Sonnet 144 (along with Sonnet 138) was published in the Passionate Pilgrim (1599). Shortly before this, Francis Meres referred to Shakespeare's Sonnets in his handbook of Elizabethan poetry, Palladis Tamia, or Wit's Treasurie, published in 1598, which was frequently talked about in the literary centers of London taverns. Shakespeare's sonnets are mostly addressed to a young man, but the chief subject of Sonnet 127 through Sonnet 152 is the "dark lady". Several sonnets portray a conflicted relationship between the speaker, the "dark lady" and the young man. Sonnet 144 is one of the most prominent sonnets to address this conflict.

== Structure ==
Sonnet 144 is an English or Shakespearean sonnet. The English sonnet has three quatrains, followed by a final rhyming couplet. It follows the typical rhyme scheme of the form abab cdcd efef gg and is composed in iambic pentameter, a type of poetic metre based on five pairs of metrically weak/strong syllabic positions. The 4th line exemplifies a regular iambic pentameter:

  ×  /  ×    /    ×  / ×   / ×     / 
The worser spirit a woman colour'd ill.

 ×  /   ×  /    ×  /     ×  / ×   /(×) 
To win me soon to hell, my female evil (144.4-5)

/ = ictus, a metrically strong syllabic position. × = nonictus. (×) = extrametrical syllable.

The 5th line (scanned above) has a final extrametrical syllable or feminine ending, as does the 7th line. The 8th line exhibits a common metrical variation, an initial reversal; it potentially also features a rightward movement of the fourth ictus (resulting in a four-position figure, × × / /, sometimes referred to as a minor ionic):

 / ×    ×   / × /  ×    ×   /     / 
Wooing his purity with her foul pride. (144.8)

Shakespeare's frequent implied emphasis of pronouns may render the second half of this line regular. Lines 6 and 8 also feature initial reversals, and line 2 potentially does. Line 11 has a potential mid-line reversal, but if a somewhat playful contrastive accent on "to" is inferred, this would render the line regular. Line 9 has a minor ionic. The first ictus of line 14 might fall on any one of the first three syllables, rendering a slightly different shade of meaning with each choice.

The meter demands that line 4's "spirit" function as one syllable, as distinct from its two-syllable appearance in line 2.

== Autobiographical interpretations ==
Michelle Burnham adopts the nineteenth century theories that Shakespeare's sonnets contain autobiographical information about him, in order to explore the novel Ulysses. Through her examination into Joyce's use of the poems, the reader can discover the mindset of the nineteenth century Shakespeare reader. Burnham affirms that critics of the past believed that Shakespeare was caught in a love triangle between a fair boy and dark woman in her article, "'Dark Lady and Fair Man': The Love Triangle in Shakespeare's Sonnet and Ulysses". Stephen Booth reinforces this argument by stating that in line 7 "my saint" "is [written] in the courtly love tradition, in which poets customarily spoke about their beloveds in the manner and language of... worshipers to, or about, saints". Harvey Stanborough claims that Shakespeare's Sonnet 144 discusses not a bisexual relationship between the author and "a man right fair" and "a woman coloured ill", but rather it reveals Shakespeare's internal conflict as an artist. He proposes "that it was actually addressed to a much broader, general audience and is an attempted explanation of his own artistic mind". To him, the two loves in the sonnet embody two passions which pull at Shakespeare's mind in opposing directions: "the speaker is explaining that he has two passions: a passion (desire) for comfort, and a passion (need) for despair". He uses a less edited version of the sonnet to assert that the first line of the poem makes a clear distinction between passions rather than lovers. He uses "Two loves I have, of Comfort and Despaire" to show that the separation of the comma "contend[s] that the two loves he mentions are not people at all, but the two sides--light and dark--of his creative personality".

Stephen Booth argues that the editing of the comma "has no effect on the logic of the line". Stanborough furthers his argument by "argu[ing] that he [Shakespeare] is introducing us to the good side of himself, the side that psychologists call the 'presenting self,'...Being a male, he naturally describes the 'better Angell' as masculine; he also describes it as 'right faire,'... to signify the light of goodness".

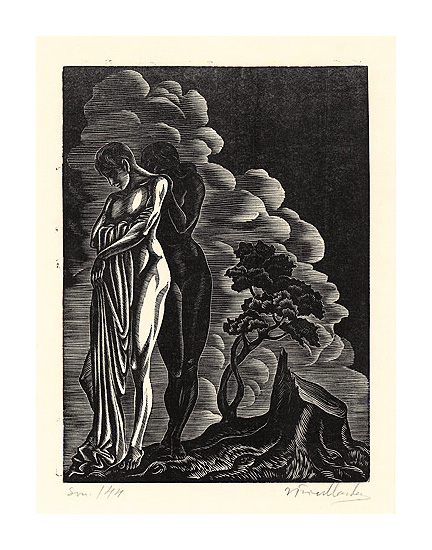
"Shakespeare's Two Loves"

To explain the presence of the "dark lady", Stanborough asserts that she is the good self's exact opposite: "The first was masculine, so this one is necessarily characterized as feminine; the first was 'faire,' or light, so this one is 'colour'd ill.'" The entire argument is based in the fact that Stanborough believes that, in order to have creative insight, an artist has mental divisions between depression and joy. Booth exposes the underlying sexual nature of the poem in line 12 where it states "one angel in another's hell". He talks about the work of Ingram and Redpath when they discuss the meanings used for hell in the time Shakespeare was writing. They wrote that "several meanings appear to be present: ... such a position was often used as a pretext for a sexual tumble; 'hell' is probably also... the female sexual organ" in which case "'one angel' is the man, and 'another' is the woman" clearly engaging in sex.

Clara Longworth de Chambrun writes, "None who hears the cry of remorse and anguish in Shakespeare's poems can doubt that their author traversed a period of great moral suffering. The serene atmosphere of his later work seems to attest that he came through the fire tempered and ripened. The facts also sustain this hypothesis and explain his Life's Philosophy. 'Men must endure their going hence, even as their coming hither, ripeness is all.'" De Chambrun describes how the W.H. theory originated. Thomas Thorpe, a "pirate publisher", published a volume of Shakespeare's sonnets with the following inscription, "To the onlie begetter of these insuing sonnets, Mr. W.H." De Chambrun criticizes the initials and she does not believe in following the Herbertist (William Herbert, Earl of Pembroke in 1623) theory; rather she writes of "graver critics" seeing the letters standing for Will Hall, a trafficker of manuscripts and a favorite of Thorpe, the "Piratical Publisher". De Chambrun continues, if the Earl of Pembroke, William Herbert, was Mr. W.H., then the critics who believe the dark lady to be Mary Fitton (known mistress) would be incorrect, because Mary Fitton was a blonde.

Henry David Gray writes on the complexity of views that readers have had while contemplating the sonnets. The Southamptonites, who date them from 1592 to 1596, believe the first 125 are in chronological order, the dark lady is Elizabeth Vernon, and the rival poet is Drayton. His next group of readers are Pembrokists, dating the sonnets from 1598 to 1603. Their dark lady is Mary Fitton and their rival poet Chapman. Gray believed, following Sir Sidney Lee, that the sonnets are literary exercises, it is important to identify the dark lady, W.H. is not the youth addressed in the first 125 and they are not in chronological order; he had no idea who the rival poet is. He wrote, "I am a free lance among the Sonnets' critics with a special set of conjectures all my own; though I do agree with Butler that that W.H. is William Hughes, with Acheson that the Dark Lady is Mistress Davanant, and with Montmorency that the Rival Poet is Spenser."

== Religious interpretations ==
There is a Christian element present in Sonnet 144. Shakespeare refers to the man and woman as angels. Helen Vendler believes that the boy represents salvations while the woman is sin. "Q1 offers the familiar Christian model of the better angel and the worser spirit, both prompting the speaking, but transforms these spirits into loves, and gives them names deriving from theology: comfort (salvation) and despair (the unforgivable sin). The iconographic description fair/ colored ill supports the Christian model of angel and devil." The bad angel comes between the poet and the good angel. "Q2 while beginning with the Christian presumption that the bad angel wants to win [the speaker] soon to hell, slides away from the motive in lines 7-8, as a witty new version of the old plot emerges; the bad angel loses interest in the speaker, and turns her interest to the better spirit." Sonnet 144 reflects Shakespeare's relationships with young boy and the dark lady through the use of Christian images.

== Homoeroticism ==
Shakespeare addresses many of his sonnets to a young male, whom many have assumed to be identical with Mr. W.H., the person to whom the sonnets as a whole are dedicated. Scholars debate the nature of Shakespeare's relationship with his male companion and question whether it was a close friendship or a romantic love. The sonnets indicate that a woman who Shakespeare describes as the dark lady comes between the poet and Mr. W.H. Sonnet 144 addresses this conflict.

Critics have been unsuccessful at pinpointing the exact identity of Mr. W.H. Douglas Trevor points out that the young boy mentioned in the sonnets may not be a specific person: "Scholars puzzled over the identity of the speaker's male friend, debating whether or not he is one male or a composite, rooted in real life or a purely literary conjuring." Scholars have developed a few possibilities for the identity of Mr. W.H., such as William Herbert and Henry Wriothesley. Critics have also wondered about the woman who came between Shakespeare and the boy: "And of course there is the dark lady, identified alternatively as a nameless aristocrat, a commoner, Queen Elizabeth, her maid of honor Mary Fitton, the London prostitute Lucy Negro, the poet Aemilia Lanyer, and so on."

The identities of these two characters are still in question but modern scholars tend to focus more on the sexual eroticism and implication of homosexuality in the Sonnets: "The reality of the poet's purported bisexual identity now figuring more prominently than any speculation about real figures with whom Shakespeare might have actually been involved, amorously or otherwise." On the other hand, there are critics who view Shakespeare's relationship with the young boy as a friendship rather than romantic love. This is the view that K.D. Sethna holds: "The problem, of course, is the two main characters round whom Shakespeare's Sonnets exult and agonize with a passionate quixotism of friendship and a frantic fever of love- or, as G. Wilson Knight sums up in the current jargon, "homosexual idealism and heterosexual lust.'" John Berryman, on the other hand, understands the first line of Sonnet 144 to be Shakespeare's way of confessing his romantic relationship with the boy and the dark lady: "This is the sonnet of which the poet John Berryman remarked, in his comments on Lowell in The Freedom of the Poet, 'When Shakespeare wrote ["Two lovers I have"] reader, he was not kidding." Helen Vendler agrees with Berryman's analysis: "Sonnet 144 has an air of confession."

If evaluated through queer hermeneutics, Sonnet 144 can appear to have homoerotic overtones. For example, Oscar Wilde's "The Portrait of Mr. W.H." is a critical analysis of Shakespeare's Sonnets that emphasizes their potential homoeroticism. Wilde believed in the theory that the young man addressed in the sonnets was an actor in Shakespeare's troupe named Willie Hughes. The sonnets are thus a love letter from Shakespeare to Willie Hughes. Wilde writes, "[Shakespeare] finds that what his tongue had spoken his soul had listened to, and that the raiment that he had put on for the disguise is a plague-stricken and poisonous thing that eats into his flesh, and that he cannot throw away. Then comes Desire, with its many maladies, and Lust that makes one love all that one loathes, and Shame, with its ashen face and secret smile." Wilde writes of Shakespeare's mental and emotional battle of whom to love and how to love that person. Wilde writes specifically of Sonnet 144, "[Shakespeare] has his moments of loathing for her [the Dark Lady], for, not content with enslaving the soul of Shakespeare, she seems to have sought to snare the senses of Willie Hughes." In Sonnet 144, the second quatrain is full of dislike toward the Dark Lady, "To win me soon to hell, my female evil / … / and would corrupt my saint to be a devil."

Wilde recognizes that the Willie Hughes theory is just a theory. One will never know what Shakespeare was thinking when he was completing the sonnets. "Shakespeare's heart is still to us a 'a closet never pierc'd with crystal eyes,' as he calls it in one of the sonnets. We shall never know the true secret of the passion of his life."

C.B. Cox writes, "In Elizabethan times the crime of buggery was punishable by death. Today this legal term for homosexual intercourse offends our ears, but its use draws attention to the abhorrence with which many Christians of the time (and since) regarded physical intimacies between men. In these circumstances it's difficult to believe that Shakespeare would not only participate in an active homosexual relation with a handsome young man, but broadcast this affair to the world in sexually explicit sonnets pass round among his friends." The competing view of a bisexual Shakespeare conflicts with Wilde's view. Cox bases his argument on the verb "to have." He argues that why must the verb usage of "to have" mean sexually possess? Elizabethan people had trouble believing "had" meant to have sexually when it came to the young man, but Cox writes, "It's difficult to refute Pequiney's contention that in these three examples (Sonnet 52, Sonnet 75, and Sonnet 87) there is a sexual innuendo in "had," particularly when in Sonnet 129, which concerns heterosexual love for the Dark Lady, everyone agrees that there is such an implication,. Elizabethan society feared homosexual desire, but embraced heterosexual conquests. Cox writes, "The poems may be based on personal experience but still that doesn't actually prove that Shakespeare 'had' the youth. There's an element of playfulness in the sexual innuendoes, a delight in wit as if Shakespeare is enjoying his own virtuosity and may not have expected to be taken literally... In his poems to the youth he may be using sexual innuendo as a kind of joke, a playful but at times almost serious hint that his affection may even extend to physical desire."
