= Sonnet 151 =

« » Sonnet 151
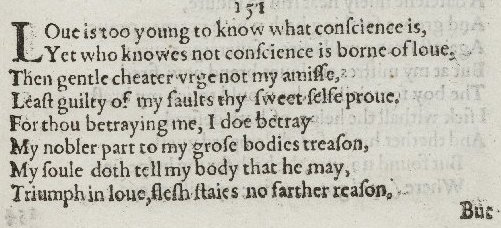
- The first eight lines of Sonnet 151 in the 1609 Quarto
Q1
Q2
Q3
C
Love is too young to know what conscience is;
Yet who knows not conscience is born of love?
Then, gentle cheater, urge not my amiss,
Lest guilty of my faults thy sweet self prove:
For, thou betraying me, I do betray
My nobler part to my gross body’s treason;
My soul doth tell my body that he may
Triumph in love; flesh stays no farther reason,
But rising at thy name doth point out thee
As his triumphant prize. Proud of this pride,
He is contented thy poor drudge to be,
To stand in thy affairs, fall by thy side.
No want of conscience hold it that I call
Her “love” for whose dear love I rise and fall.
—William Shakespeare
4
8
12
14

Sonnet 151 is the 151st of 154 poems in sonnet form by William Shakespeare published in a 1609 collection titled Shakespeare's sonnets. The sonnet belongs to the Dark Lady sequence (sonnets 127–152), which distinguishes itself from The Fair Youth sequence by being more overtly sexual in its passion. Sonnet 151 is characterized as "bawdy" and is used to illustrate the difference between the spiritual love for the Fair Youth and the sexual love for the Dark Lady. The distinction is commonly made in the introduction to modern editions of the sonnets in order to avoid suggesting that Shakespeare was homosexual. In the poem, the speaker admonishes the Dark Lady for accusing him of sin while she is also unfaithful, and uses the body as a metaphor for a penis rising and falling.

== Structure ==
Sonnet 151 is an English or Shakespearean sonnet. The English sonnet has three quatrains, followed by a final rhyming couplet. It follows the typical rhyme scheme of the form ABAB CDCD EFEF GG and is composed in iambic pentameter, a type of poetic metre based on five pairs of metrically weak/strong syllabic positions. The 3rd line exemplifies a regular iambic pentameter:

  ×    /  ×    /  ×   /     ×   / × / 
Then, gentle cheater, urge not my amiss, (151.3)

The 8th line features two common metrical variations: an initial reversal and a final extrametrical syllable or feminine ending:

  /×    ×   /      ×     /    ×  /   ×   / (×) 
Triumph in love; flesh stays no farther reason, (151.8)

/ = ictus, a metrically strong syllabic position. × = nonictus. (×) = extrametrical syllable.

The 8th line also necessarily has a feminine ending. Line 1 has an initial reversal, and mid-line reversals are found in lines 2, 10, 12, and potentially line 5. Line 6 features the rightward movement of the third ictus (resulting in a four-position figure, × × / /, sometimes referred to as a minor ionic):

 ×  /  ×   /    ×  ×   /    / ×     / (×) 
My nobler part to my gross body's treason; (151.6)

A minor ionic also occurs in line 11.

== Exegesis ==
The poem starts with an admonishment to the Dark Lady to not accuse the speaker of sin since she might find herself guilty of the same; specifically her infidelity to the speaker by sleeping with the Fair Youth. The speaker's sin, on the other hand, is to betray himself by allowing his body rather than his soul to steer his actions. It uses the body as a metaphor for the penis, "rising" and "falling" with an erection when aroused, and so reduces the speaker to nothing more than his phallus; by giving in to his desires he enslaves himself to the Dark Lady. Sonnet 151, with a "bawdy chronicle of erection and detumescence", contrasts with Sonnet 55's "grandiloquent expression", but their theme is the same: "what changes, what remains". Sonnet 55 "celebrates ... love and poetry that endure[s]" where Sonnet 151 "contemplates the inevitability of change".

Sonnet 151 has been compared to a verse by 17th-century author Joseph Swetnam—published in 1615 under the pseudonym Thomas Tell-Troth, in a pamphlet titled The Arraignment of Lewd, Idle, Froward, and Unconstant Women—satirizing the vices of women. "The woman's best part call it I dare / Wherein no man comes but must stand bare / And let him be never so stout / T'will take him down before he goes out." Both poems imply that sex subordinates the man to the woman.

The bawdy imagery of the poem, from the "nobler part" ("penis") in line 6 "rising at thy name", its "rise and fall" at line 14, has been discussed at length.

== In film ==
This sonnet is featured in Derek Jarman's film The Angelic Conversation, which discusses homosexuality. It is the first poem shown in the film, the only one not read aloud, and one of only two partially and not wholly portrayed (the last two lines of Sonnet 57 are also omitted). Only the first two lines of the poem are seen on screen. Jarman is attempting to challenge the idea that Shakespeare was solely heterosexual. In the context of his film, the opening two lines seem to communicate that conscience and ethics come from sexual attraction.
