= Sonnet 135 =

« » Sonnet 135
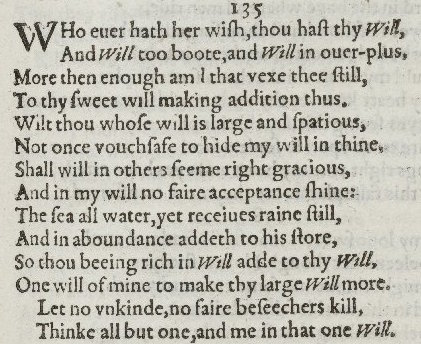
- Sonnet 135 in the 1609 Quarto
Q1
Q2
Q3
C
Whoever hath her wish, thou hast thy “Will,”
And “Will” to boot, and “Will” in overplus;
More than enough am I that vex thee still,
To thy sweet will making addition thus.
Wilt thou, whose will is large and spacious,
Not once vouchsafe to hide my will in thine?
Shall will in others seem right gracious,
And in my will no fair acceptance shine?
The sea, all water, yet receives rain still,
And in abundance addeth to his store;
So thou, being rich in “Will,” add to thy “Will”
One will of mine, to make thy large “Will” more.
Let no unkind, no fair beseechers kill;
Think all but one, and me in that one “Will.”
—William Shakespeare
4
8
12
14

In Shakespeare's Sonnet 135, the speaker appeals to his mistress after having been rejected by her.

== Synopsis ==
In the first quatrain of the sonnet, the speaker pledges himself to the mistress, while he humbly refers to himself as "I that vex thee." It can be roughly paraphrased as: You have me, and me, and me again.

The second quatrain can be paraphrased thus: Since your will is large and spacious, won't you let me hide my will in yours? Especially since you are graciously accepting others, but not myself?

In the third quatrain, he likens the mistress to an ocean, which would be able to comfortably accommodate an additional quantity of water. Thus, he implicitly gives up the right to an exclusive relationship with the mistress.

There is some debate over the meaning of the final couplet; in her book The Art of Shakespeare's Sonnets, Helen Vendler supported the interpretation by G. B. Evans (Shakespeare's Sonnets, 1996) as "Let no unkind [persons] kill no fair beseechers."

== Structure ==
Sonnet 135 is an English or Shakespearean sonnet. The English sonnet has three quatrains, followed by a final rhyming couplet. Nominally, it follows the rhyme scheme of the form ABAB CDCD EFEF GG, although (unusually) rhymes a, e, and g feature the same sound. It is composed in iambic pentameter, a type of poetic metre based on five pairs of metrically weak/strong syllabic positions. The 2nd line exemplifies a regular iambic pentameter:

×     /     ×  /    ×     /    ×  / ×   /
And "Will" to boot, and "Will" in overplus;

 /     ×  × /    ×  /   ×   /    ×    /
More than enough am I that vex thee still, (135.2-3)

/ = ictus, a metrically strong syllabic position. × = nonictus.

The 3rd line (scanned above) features a common metrical variation, an initial reversal; similarly, line 4 has a mid-line reversal. Potentially, line 10 contains an initial reversal, and line 1 a mid-line reversal. Line 8 potentially features a rightward movement of the first ictus (resulting in a four-position figure, × × / /, sometimes referred to as a minor ionic):

×   ×   /  /    ×  /   ×  /  ×      /
And in my will no fair acceptance shine? (135.8)

Lines 4 and 11 also potentially contain minor ionics.

The meter demands a few variant pronunciations: line 5's "spacious" and line 7's "gracious" must each fill out three syllables, while line 11's "being" functions as one.

== Analysis ==
=== "Will" ===
Counting the contraction wilt as instance of the word will, this sonnet uses the word will a total of fourteen times. Stephen Booth notes "Sonnets 135 and 136 are festivals of verbal ingenuity in which much of the fun derives from the grotesque lengths the speaker goes to for a maximum number and concentration of puns on will." He notes the following meanings used in these two sonnets:

- (a) what one wishes to have or do
- (b) the auxiliary verb indicating futurity and/or purpose
- (c) lust, carnal desire
- (d) the male sex organ
- (e) the female sex organ
- (f) an abbreviation of "William" (Shakespeare's first name, conceivably also the name of the Dark Lady's husband)

In the 1609 Quarto edition of Sonnets several instances of the word Will are capitalized and italicized.
