= Sonnet 150 =

« » Sonnet 150
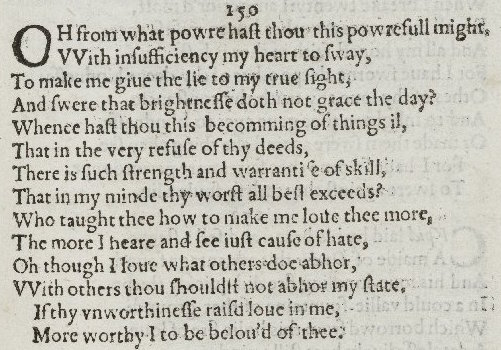
- Sonnet 150 in the 1609 Quarto
Q1
Q2
Q3
C
O, from what power hast thou this powerful might
With insufficiency my heart to sway?
To make me give the lie to my true sight,
And swear that brightness doth not grace the day?
Whence hast thou this becoming of things ill,
That in the very refuse of thy deeds
There is such strength and warrantise of skill,
That, in my mind, thy worst all best exceeds?
Who taught thee how to make me love thee more,
The more I hear and see just cause of hate?
O, though I love what others do abhor,
With others thou shouldst not abhor my state:
If thy unworthiness rais’d love in me,
More worthy I to be belov’d of thee.
—William Shakespeare
4
8
12
14

Sonnet 150 is one of 154 sonnets written by the English playwright and poet William Shakespeare. It is considered a Dark Lady sonnet, as are all from 127 to 152. Nonetheless, 150 is an outlier, and in some ways appears to belong more to the Fair Youth.

== Structure ==
Sonnet 150 is an English or Shakespearean sonnet. The English sonnet has three quatrains, followed by a final rhyming couplet. It follows the typical rhyme scheme of the form ABAB CDCD EFEF GG and is composed in iambic pentameter, a type of poetic metre based on five pairs of metrically weak/strong syllabic positions. The 12th line exemplifies a regular iambic pentameter:

 ×   /  ×     /    ×       /  ×  /   ×   / 
With others thou shouldst not abhor my state: (150.12)

/ = ictus, a metrically strong syllabic position. × = nonictus.

The 5th line (potentially) begins with a common metrical variant, an initial reversal; and it ends with the rightward movement of the fourth ictus (resulting in a four-position figure, × × / /, sometimes referred to as a minor ionic):

  /     ×     ×    /   × / ×   ×    /    / 
Whence hast thou this becoming of things ill, (150.5)

Lines 1, 8, and 11 also potentially have initial reversals, and line 3 has a minor ionic.

The meter demands that line 1's "power" function as one syllable, and "powerful" as two.
