= Sonnet 137 =

« » Sonnet 137
- The first two lines of Sonnet 137 in the 1609 Quarto
Q1
Q2
Q3
C
Thou blind fool, Love, what dost thou to mine eyes,
That they behold, and see not what they see?
They know what beauty is, see where it lies,
Yet what the best is take the worst to be.
If eyes, corrupt by over-partial looks,
Be anchor’d in the bay where all men ride,
Why of eyes’ falsehood hast thou forged hooks,
Whereto the judgement of my heart is tied?
Why should my heart think that a several plot
Which my heart knows the wide world’s common place?
Or mine eyes seeing this, say this is not,
To put fair truth upon so foul a face?
In things right true my heart and eyes have erred,
And to this false plague are they now transferred.
—William Shakespeare
4
8
12
14

Sonnet 137 is one of 154 sonnets written by the English playwright and poet William Shakespeare.

== Structure ==
Sonnet 137 is an English or Shakespearean sonnet. The English sonnet has three quatrains, followed by a final rhyming couplet. It follows the typical rhyme scheme of the form abab cdcd efef gg and is composed in iambic pentameter, a type of poetic metre based on five pairs of metrically weak/strong syllabic positions. The 5th line exemplifies a regular iambic pentameter:

×  /      ×  /    × / ×   /   ×   / 
If eyes, corrupt by over-partial looks, (137.5)

/ = ictus, a metrically strong syllabic position. × = nonictus.

Line 11 begins with the rightward movement of the first ictus (resulting in a four-position figure, × × / /, sometimes referred to as a minor ionic):

×   ×   /     / ×     /    ×    /  ×   / 
Or mine eyes seeing this, say this is not, (137.11)

A minor ionic potentially occurs in line 10. Several lines (3, 7, 8, 9, 14) potentially contain either initial or mid-line reversals. The mid-line reversal of line 14 is metrically more complex:

×    /   ×   /      /    ×     ×   /    ×   / 
And to this false plague are they now transferred. (137.14)

The first ictus may fall on any of the first three words, but the complex element is "false plague": Peter Groves calls this a "harsh mapping", and recommends that in performance "the best thing to do is to prolong the subordinated S-syllable [here, "false"] ... the effect of this is to throw a degree of emphasis on it".

The meter demands that line 7's "forgèd" be pronounced as two syllables.
