= Sonnet 136 =

« » Sonnet 136
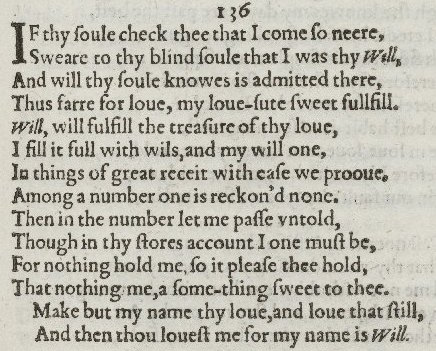
- Sonnet 136 in the 1609 Quarto
Q1
Q2
Q3
C
If thy soul check thee that I come so near,
Swear to thy blind soul that I was thy “Will,”
And will, thy soul knows, is admitted there;
Thus far for love, my love-suit, sweet, fulfil.
“Will” will fulfil the treasure of thy love,
Ay, fill it full with wills, and my will one.
In things of great receipt with ease we prove
Among a number one is reckon’d none:
Then in the number let me pass untold,
Though in thy store’s account I one must be;
For nothing hold me, so it please thee hold
That nothing me, a something sweet to thee:
Make but my name thy love, and love that still,
And then thou lov’st me, for my name is “Will.”
—William Shakespeare
4
8
12
14

Sonnet 136 is one of 154 sonnets written by the English playwright and poet William Shakespeare.

== Structure ==
=== Verse structure ===
Sonnet 136 is an English or Shakespearean sonnet. The English sonnet has three quatrains, followed by a final rhyming couplet. It follows the typical rhyme scheme of the form abab cdcd efef gg and is composed in iambic pentameter, a type of poetic metre based on five pairs of metrically weak/strong syllabic positions. The 7th line exemplifies a regular iambic pentameter:

×    /    ×    /    × /     ×   /     ×   / 
In things of great receipt with ease we prove (136.7)

/ = ictus, a metrically strong syllabic position. × = nonictus.

The 9th line begins with a common metrical variation, an initial reversal:

  /  ×    ×  /  ×   /   ×  /   ×  / 
Then in the number let me pass untold, (136.9)

Initial reversals also occur in lines 2, 5, and 13, and potentially in line 10. Mid-line reversals potentially occur in lines 2 and 3; however, both of these lines present similar metrical difficulties. In line 2 for example:

  /    ×   ×   /    ?     ?  ?  ?    ?   / 
Swear to thy blind soul that I was thy "Will," (136.2)

If "blind" is given accent, the meter in that section becomes regular; however it is not clear that this is rhetorically appropriate (for example, it is not being contrasted with a "sighted soul"). If not given accent, this results in a case where both "blind" and "soul" have tonic stress, but that of "blind" is normally subordinated to that of "soul", allowing them comfortably to fill odd/even positions, but not even/odd (as they do here). The string of functional monosyllables which follow must themselves be scanned by context rather than implicit lexical stress. A reversal of the third ictus (which would better accommodate "soul") is normally preceded by at least a slight intonational break, which "blind soul" does not allow. Nevertheless, the line might be scanned:

  /    ×   ×   /    /     ×  ×  /    ×   / 
Swear to thy blind soul that I was thy "Will," (136.2)

Peter Groves calls this a "harsh mapping", and recommends that in performance "the best thing to do is to prolong the subordinated S-syllable [here, "blind"] ... the effect of this is to throw a degree of emphasis on it".

=== Rhetorical structure ===
In her book, The Art of Shakespeare's Sonnets, Helen Vendler identifies three different ways of representing the division of the sonnet. The first of these follows a 6-6-2 pattern and is identified by the lack of the use of the words will and love in the inner six lines. The two words are a major focus of quatrain 1, quatrain 2, and the couplet, but are conspicuously absent from quatrain three. Vendler's second method of dividing the poem is by speech acts, and follows and 4-2-2-5-1 division. Each division of the sonnet focuses on a particular style of speech, which change as the speaker changes his tactic for addressing the subject. The divisions are as follows; adjuration (lines 1–4), promise (5-6), proposition (7-8), plea (9-13), and result/conclusion (14). The final method of division that Vendler identifies is a pronominal distinction, and is divided by a 6-2-6 pattern. In the first six lines are representative of the pronoun I, in which the speaker focuses on the fantastic private aspects of love. This is followed by a "turn" at lines 6-7 when the speaker suddenly becomes public with his use of the pronoun we, which is generally viewed as referring to all humankind. The poem turns again at the couplet when the speaker again returns to the use of the pronoun/.

Robert Matz finds Shakespeare to "draw comically on the Renaissance tie between a woman's sexual infidelity and her failure more generally to conform to the period idea of the "good" woman." The multiple uses of "will" "refers to the lady's willfulness rather than her passivity, her strong sexual desire, and her vagina."

== Analysis ==
Along with Sonnet 135, Sonnet 136 is counted as one of the "Will" Sonnets. They are highlighted by their bawdy nature and self-deprecating humor on the part of the speaker. The two sonnets use the word "Will" in three distinct ways. The first reference is to William Shakespeare as the speaker of the poem, the second is representative of a person's wants or wishes; and it also carries the sense of a sex-desire which was a common usage in Shakespeare's time.

=== Quatrain 1 ===
The speaker begins the sonnet by saying that if the subject's soul reproves her, then because it is not a conscious thought, she can still swear to her soul that the speaker is her William. This is significant because modern historians have tentatively identified the dark lady of the sonnets as Emilia Lanier, who was married to Shakespeare's friend Will Lanier. Because her soul knows this will (wish), this is taken as meaning that love is admissible. Atkins agrees, quoting Tyler as saying line 2 refers to a soul without eyes and which is therefore blind and dark.

=== Quatrain 2 ===
"Will" in the fifth line is used as a pun on the speaker's name and his sexual desire. The speaker is saying both that he, Will, can fulfill the lady's desires and also that he can fulfill her sexually. It is possible that both uses of will in line six are used to mean sex-desire. The speaker is using this quatrain to allude to the fact that the lady has many lovers and he would only be one among many. Regarding line 8 listing one as not a number, this must be taken as if "number" were in the aggregate sense. In this case, "one" is no number because it is single and not a number of things. In her essay, Sex Without Issue, Valerie Traub finds Shakespeare's linguistic repetition and coital filling and merging to be an attempt to remove the differences between the sexes, and even to subvert the female desires with the poet's own male desires.

=== Quatrain 3 ===
The third quatrain can be considered almost satirical in nature. The word nothing is used both as a numerical value and also as a common Elizabethan slang term for vagina. The speaker changes tactics and beseeches the lady to simply "hold" him but think of him as "nothing", as long as he can please her. This has been interpreted as an attempt to talk the lady into bed after attempts at love have failed. With this interpretation, the speaker has gone from pledging himself as a love interest, to thinking only of satisfying his own carnal desires, by saying that she should consider him suited for her "nothing".

=== Couplet ===
In the couplet, the speaker changes his initial argument of "love my will" to "love my name". The final line of the poem then shows the speaker's name and his will (wish) is one and the same. Here the speaker uses the argument that "if you only do X, then Y will be true" or "since you love Will, then you will love me because my name is Will". Vendler identifies this as only mildly triumphant because it is obvious that the mistress was aware of the speaker's name beforehand.

=== Gender ===
With regards to gender, William Nelles quotes Edward Malone, stating that "...[the "Dark Lady Sonnets"] could relate to either a male or a female" as the narrator's love interest. However, Nelles also quotes G. Blackmore Evans in an opposing view on this, stating that "all of Sonnets 1-126 are addressed to the same young man, and all Sonnets 127-52 to the same woman". These views that Nelles compiles in his essay show an ambiguity in the gender of the "Dark Lady Sonnets'" love interest. Nelles, however, comes to a different conclusion, believing instead that there is no one side or the other. Rather, Nelles argues that "both sides are correct, but in different ways". He finds that only about one-fifth of the sonnets specify the lover's gender, and that the ambiguity of the gender is possibly an important commentary on the view of the speaker on his lover, be it man or woman, and how this lover is described and referred to through these sonnets. Whereas most scholars believe that Sonnet 136 is about a woman - hence it being part of the "Dark Lady Sonnets" - Nelles offers an interesting insight of the typical dichotomy of the lovers' genders and the lack of "real evidence" backing up the claims for one side or another. Wagner, the author of Voices of Shakespeare's England, seems to back up Nelles's claim, stating that the time in which Shakespeare was writing was one in which writers no longer had to follow strict guidelines of what was considered "proper" writing, and could write on subjects which "interested themselves and their audiences". This could suggest that, with further research on the topic of gender in Sonnet 136 and the other Dark Lady Sonnets, the lover's gender could be determined, or it could be decided by scholars that the gender truly is ambiguous; perhaps, even, the reason behind the ambiguous gender could be decoded.

=== Will ===
The issue of "will" is a theme which comes up regarding sonnet 136. Bradin Cormack states that the use of the word "will" is meant to be a way of describing the "dynamic in terms of a will's binding the subject to an object". Cormack argues that the use of the term "will" is used by Shakespeare as a philosophical structure to analyze the relationship between "subject" and "object;" "object" pertaining to Shakespeare and "subject" to his mistress. Specifically in terms of Sonnet 136, the term "will" amplifies the argument that "seduction is the resolution to a formal... problem that one content alone (Will) can solve". Sonnet 136 does this by making the speaker a focus. It uses the play on words to relate Will to the way the mistress "wills" herself to be "willing" to love the speaker, who equates himself to the "willing will itself" in lines five through twelve. Ronald D. Gray, author of Shakespeare On Love, supports Cormack's claims. Gray says that the use of "will" is meant to be a personification of love in the soul - as a "will" to love another - rather than in the body. Using his own name in the pun, Shakespeare gives that "Will/will" is a power which allows both the object and the subject to love most freely through each other by having the "will" to love "Will:" "Make but my name thy love, and love that still/And then thou lov'st me, for my name is Will". Gray also agrees with Cormack here, stating that the final "Will" of the poem is a way of the speaker illustrating his "ability to fill the mistress with other wills" to love her; a humble plea from the speaker to woo the mistress in question.
