= Sonnet 143 =

« » Sonnet 143
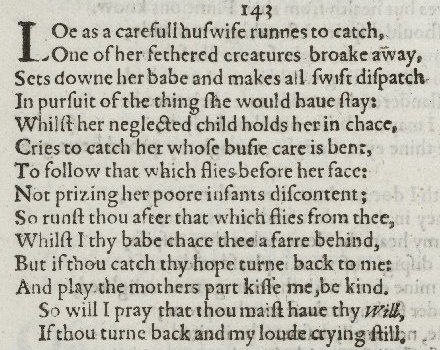
- Sonnet 143 in the 1609 Quarto
Q1
Q2
Q3
C
Lo, as a careful housewife runs to catch
One of her feather’d creatures broke away,
Sets down her babe, and makes all swift dispatch
In pursuit of the thing she would have stay;
Whilst her neglected child holds her in chase,
Cries to catch her whose busy care is bent
To follow that which flies before her face,
Not prizing her poor infant’s discontent:
So runn’st thou after that which flies from thee,
Whilst I thy babe chase thee afar behind;
But if thou catch thy hope, turn back to me,
And play the mother’s part, kiss me, be kind:
So will I pray that thou mayst have thy “Will,”
If thou turn back and my loud crying still.
—William Shakespeare
4
8
12
14

Sonnet 143 is one of 154 sonnets written by the English playwright and poet William Shakespeare.

== Structure ==
Sonnet 143 is an English or Shakespearean sonnet. The English sonnet has three quatrains, followed by a final rhyming couplet. It follows the typical rhyme scheme of the form ABAB CDCD EFEF GG and is composed in iambic pentameter, a type of poetic metre based on five pairs of metrically weak/strong syllabic positions. The 7th line exemplifies a regular iambic pentameter:

 ×  /  ×    /    ×     /    × /    ×   / 
To follow that which flies before her face, (143.7)

/ = ictus, a metrically strong syllabic position. × = nonictus.

Line 2 begins with a common metrical variation, an initial reversal:

/   ×   ×   /   ×      /    ×    /   × / 
One of her feather'd creatures broke away, (143.2)

Initial reversals occur in lines 2 and 6, and potentially in lines 1, 3, 5, and 13. Several phrases which might imply a metrical variant in other contexts are rendered doubtful in this poem because of the frequency with which contrastive accent on pronouns is suggested by both the nature of the story and the meter. For example, line 5 is capable of both an initial and a mid-line reversal:

  /     ×   ×  /  ×    /    /     ×  ×    / 
Whilst her neglected child holds her in chase, (143.5)

However, the story's emphasis on pronouns may render a regular reading more likely:

  ×     /   ×  /  ×    /    ×     /  ×    / 
Whilst her neglected child holds her in chase, (143.5)

Similarly line 12's "kiss me" — which in most contexts would reverse the ictus to the tonic stress of "kiss" — might here retain a regular rhythm by implying contrastive accent on "me". Lines 8 and 12 may also suggest accentuated pronouns which maintain a regular rhythm.

The meter demands line 4's "pursuit" be stressed on the first syllable.
