= Sonnet 145 =

« » Sonnet 145
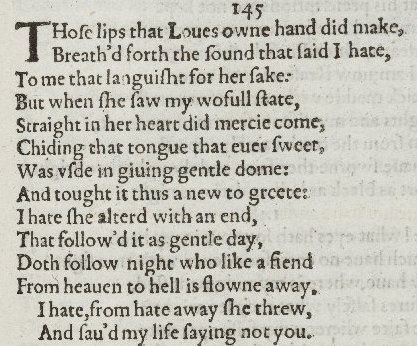
- Sonnet 145 in the 1609 Quarto
Q1
Q2
Q3
C
Those lips that Love’s own hand did make
Breath’d forth the sound that said “I hate,”
To me that languish’d for her sake:
But when she saw my woeful state,
Straight in her heart did mercy come,
Chiding that tongue that ever sweet
Was used in giving gentle doom;
And taught it thus anew to greet;
“I hate” she alter’d with an end,
That follow’d it as gentle day
Doth follow night, who, like a fiend,
From heaven to hell is flown away;
“I hate” from hate away she threw,
And sav’d my life, saying “not you.”
—William Shakespeare
4
8
12
14

Sonnet 145 is one of Shakespeare's sonnets. It forms part of the Dark Lady sequence of sonnets and is the only one written not in iambic pentameter, but instead tetrameter. It is also the Shakespeare sonnet which uses the fewest letters. It is written as a description of the feelings of a man who is so in love with a woman that hearing her say that "she hates" something immediately creates a fear that she is referring to him. But then when she notices how much pain she has caused her lover by saying that she may potentially hate him, she changes the way that she says it to assure him that she hates but does not hate him.

== Structure ==
Sonnet 145 is — in most respects — a fairly typical English or Shakespearean sonnet. The English sonnet has three quatrains, followed by a final rhyming couplet. It follows the rhyme scheme of the form ABAB CDCD EFEF GG. However this sonnet is unique in the collection because, instead of iambic pentameter, it is written in iambic tetrameter, a poetic metre based on four (rather than five) pairs of metrically weak/strong syllabic positions. The 1st line exemplifies a regular iambic tetrameter:

  ×    /     ×   /     ×    /    ×   /
Those lips that Love's own hand did make (145.1)

/ = ictus, a metrically strong syllabic position. × = nonictus.

Line 5 features a common metrical variation, an initial reversal:

   /     ×   ×   /     ×   /  ×  /
Straight in her heart did mercy come, (145.5)

An initial reversal also occurs in line 6, and potentially in line 4. A mid-line reversal occurs in line 14, and potentially in line 11.

The meter demands that line 12's "heaven" function as one syllable.

This sonnet has generally been considered by critics to be one of Shakespeare's slightest works. Its fairly simple language and syntax, along with the oddity of the meter, have led to suggestions that it was written much earlier than the other, more mature, sonnets. Gurr states,

I have not been able to find a single example in the period up to 1582 of an octosyllabic sonnet...no poet besides Shakespeare in this one curious poem wrote an octosyllabic sonnet. (225)

== Analysis involving Anne Hathaway by Andrew Gurr ==
Though it is placed within the "Dark Lady" sequence, it has been claimed that the poem was originally written for Anne Hathaway, Shakespeare's wife. This was first proposed by Andrew Gurr in 1971. Gurr suggested that the words "hate away" may be a pun (in Elizabethan pronunciation) on "Hathaway". It has also been suggested that the next words, "And saved my life", would have been indistinguishable in pronunciation from "Anne saved my life".

Gurr says in his work “Shakespeare's First Poem: Sonnet 145” that Shakespeare wrote this poem in 1582, making Shakespeare only 18. "The only explanation that makes much sense is that the play on 'hate' and throwing 'hate away' by adding an ending was meant to be read by a lady whose surname was Hathaway" (223). He argues that because spelling was not consistent in Shakespeare's time there is no way of knowing for sure whether it was to her or not. He does think it is plausible that such a pun on her name exists within this sonnet since he does make other puns in various other sonnets.

== Analysis by other critics ==
Michael Wood agrees with Andrew Gurr in the idea of this poem being about Anne and says it would make sense for this sonnet to be about her because, "He [Shakespeare] was vulnerable. Anne was twenty-six and knew the world. Reading between the lines, she would be the rock on which he relied through his life, supporting his career in London" (Wood 1978: 87).

Hilda Hulme disagrees with Andrew Gurr's take in 'Hathaway' in her essay Sonnet 145: 'I Hate, From Hathaway She Threw'. Hulme believes that Shakespeare is not in fact talking about his mistress or his wife, as Gurr believes with the pun taken on 'hate' and 'Hathaway', but that he is talking about an Old-English colloquial expression, "For those who know the imprecation 'May the devil take it', in the form Deil hae't 'Devil have it', the possibility of this 'hate' pun seems strikingly confirmed by Shakespeare's 'fiend' context".

Hulme continues to break Gurr's interpretation by suggesting that "there is, I think, at present no clear linguistic evidence in [Gurr's] support" and that her research in Stratford shows no signs of "evidence at all to confirm [Gurr's] suggestion that 'in Stratford in 1582 Hathaway and hate-away would have been a very tolerable pun'" (427). Hulme explains this by describing how her research findings showed no relation or "tolerable pun" between the end-part of the verb of 'hate' (having a specific t sound) and Hathaway (ending in th).

Hulme addresses her colloquial devil theory in Sonnet 145 which speak about the flight the word ‘hate’ takes by traveling from night to day, or from heaven to hell, as she had earlier suggested:

I hate she altered with an end,
That follow'd it as gentle day,
Doth follow night who like a fiend,
From heaven to hell is flowne away (Lines 9-12).

Hulme interprets how the words 'hate', 'fiend', and 'away' in this quatrain are more analogous to the devil than to Anne Hathaway:

"In Shakespeare's 'fiend' context, his simple adverb 'away' may similarly bring to mind the adverbial phrase 'a devil way' defined as 'originally an impatient strengthening of AWAY'...As the fiend flies back to his proper place in hell, carrying away with him the 'hate' sense of the lady's unfinished 'I hate' sentence, day follows night for the poet!"

Stephen Booth brings up an interesting point that other critics had not really mentioned. He says that a lot of people hope that it is not part of Shakespeare's work due to the odd way in which it was written, "One cannot be certain that the sonnet is Shakespeare's, but the effect it describes- that of being surprised by a sentence that signals one direction and then takes another- is an effect that Shakespeare is very fond of actually achieving in his reader" (500). He seems to believe that this sonnet is Shakespeare's based on the effects that this sonnet evokes.[4] In Schoenfeldt's article he quotes the poet Peter Levi who supports Booth's view that some do not want this to be Shakespeare's sonnet by saying, "The unusual and light metre of this sonnet, combined with its trivial theme, might sway a reasonable critic to believe that the poem is early and the pun intended...I find it almost too tasteless to credit, but not quite" (Levi 1988:40).[5] Levi says that as a poet he cannot see how this is something that Shakespeare would want credited to his work considering how different and mediocre this sonnet is to all of his other ones. Even though some critics do not like attributing this work to Shakespeare, it is hard to ignore even with its different format, the similarities it has to other sonnets Shakespeare has written.

Heather Dubrow, on the other hand, does not dismiss this sonnet "as an unfortunate and unsuccessful game, with even the most sensitive of editors asserting that it is hardly worth reprinting" but believes that "this poem is not unimportant, for it enacts a version of the issue we are considering, the way the future can change the past" (224).

Michael Shoenfeldt adds that "the poem uses syntactic suspense to depict erotic anxiety" and that the "drama of the attraction and repulsion is made to hinge on our knowledge of the names of the protagonists" (131). Definitely, one can see an "erotic anxiety" in the poem's opening lines as the word 'hate' is spoken: "Those lips that love's own hand did make / Breathed forth the sound that said 'I hate'" (Lines 1-2). Another building of an erotic anxiety is the steady list of body parts routinely named: lips, hand, heart, and tongue. If anything, the erotic anxiety is heightened to an erotic orgy of body language. This sense of giving and taking reminds the reader of theft in the form of love and hate, of stealing one's love through delivering a hateful speech. Or, as Dubrow puts it, "This preoccupation with robbery is...manifest above all in the fact that it appears even in lighthearted compliments and jokes...a playful rendition of a very serious concern with how the future can alter the shape of what has come before" (249). That would make perfect sense with what Dubrow mentioned earlier, how the future can change the past, which is seen in the poem as a playful trick put against the poet in the form of crushing his emotions, which is quickly ascertained at the end of the sonnet.

Either as a form of joke telling or sexual suggestion, Sonnet 145 reveals so little that many critics are hard pressed to find revealing details to Shakespeare's early and later life.

== Interpretations ==
- John Hurt, for the 2002 compilation album, When Love Speaks (EMI Classics)
