= Sonnet 148 =

« » Sonnet 148
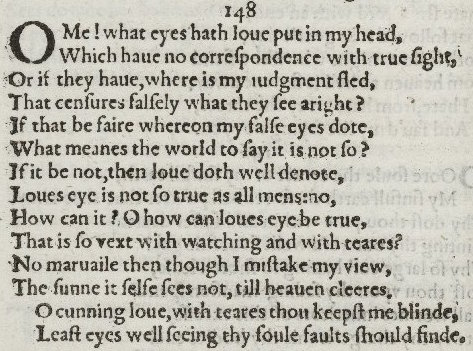
- Sonnet 148 in the 1609 Quarto
Q1
Q2
Q3
C
O, me, what eyes hath Love put in my head,
Which have no correspondence with true sight!
Or, if they have, where is my judgement fled,
That censures falsely what they see aright?
If that be fair whereon my false eyes dote,
What means the world to say it is not so?
If it be not, then love doth well denote
Love’s eye is not so true as all men’s: no,
How can it? O, how can Love’s eye be true,
That is so vex’d with watching and with tears?
No marvel then, though I mistake my view;
The sun itself sees not till heaven clears.
O cunning Love! with tears thou keep’st me blind,
Lest eyes well-seeing thy foul faults should find.
—William Shakespeare
4
8
12
14

Sonnet 148 is one of 154 sonnets written by the English playwright and poet William Shakespeare. It is considered a Dark Lady sonnet, as are all from 127 to 152.

== Structure ==
Sonnet 148 is an English or Shakespearean sonnet. The English sonnet has three quatrains, followed by a final rhyming couplet. It follows the typical rhyme scheme of the form ABAB CDCD EFEF GG and is composed in iambic pentameter, a type of poetic metre based on five pairs of metrically weak/strong syllabic positions. The 13th line exemplifies a regular iambic pentameter:

×  /  ×    /     ×    /      ×   /       ×   / 
O cunning Love! with tears thou keep'st me blind, (148.13)

/ = ictus, a metrically strong syllabic position. × = nonictus.

Line 2 exhibits a rightward movement of the fourth ictus (resulting in a four-position figure, × × / /, sometimes referred to as a minor ionic), and line 3 has a mid-line reversal and (potentially) and initial reversal:

  ×    /    ×  /  ×  /  ×     ×     /   / 
Which have no correspondence with true sight!

/   ×    ×   /      /   ×   ×  /    ×     / 
Or, if they have, where is my judgement fled, (148.2-3)

Initial reversals also potentially occur in lines 7, 8, and 11, with a potential mid-line reversal in line 1. Potential minor ionics occur in lines 6, 9, 10, and 14.
