= Sonnet 134 =

Poem by William Shakespeare

« » Sonnet 134
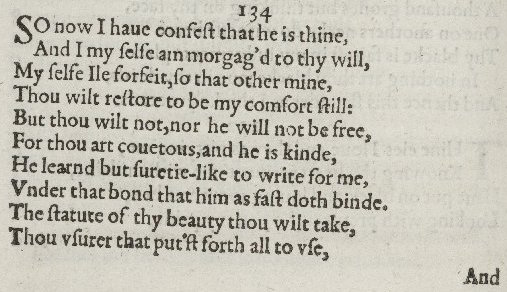
- The first ten lines of Sonnet 134 in the 1609 Quarto
Q1
Q2
Q3
C
So, now I have confess’d that he is thine
And I myself am mortgag’d to thy will,
Myself I’ll forfeit, so that other mine
Thou wilt restore, to be my comfort still:
But thou wilt not, nor he will not be free,
For thou art covetous and he is kind;
He learn’d but surety-like to write for me,
Under that bond that him as fast doth bind.
The statute of thy beauty thou wilt take,
Thou usurer, that put’st forth all to use,
And sue a friend came debtor for my sake;
So him I lose through my unkind abuse.
Him have I lost; thou hast both him and me:
He pays the whole, and yet am I not free.
—William Shakespeare
4
8
12
14

Sonnet 134 is one of 154 sonnets written by the English poet and playwright William Shakespeare. In it, the speaker confronts the Dark Lady after learning that she has seduced the Fair Youth.

== Synopsis ==
In the first quatrain, the speaker confesses that both he and the friend are at the mistress's mercy; in the second one, he surmises that the attachment will hold, due to the friend's naivete and the mistress's greed.

The remainder of the poem construes the mistress as an unethical moneylender: metaphorically, she lent her beauty to the speaker and then collected the friend as interest.

== Structure ==
Sonnet 134 is an English or Shakespearean sonnet. The English sonnet has three quatrains, followed by a final rhyming couplet. It follows the typical rhyme scheme of the form ABAB CDCD EFEF GG and is composed in iambic pentameter, a type of poetic metre based on five pairs of metrically weak/strong syllabic positions. The 1st line exemplifies a regular iambic pentameter:

 ×   /  ×  /    ×  /       ×   / ×    / 
So, now I have confess'd that he is thine (134.1)

/ = ictus, a metrically strong syllabic position. × = nonictus.

Line 8 begins with a common metrical variation, the initial reversal:

/  ×    ×   /     ×   /  ×   /    ×    / 
Under that bond that him as fast doth bind. (134.8)

A potential initial reversal occurs in line 4. Line 13 contains both an initial reversal and a potential mid-line reversal.

In line 7 the meter demands the two-syllable Elizabethan pronunciation of "surety".
