= Sonnet 146 =

Poem by William Shakespeare

« » Sonnet 146
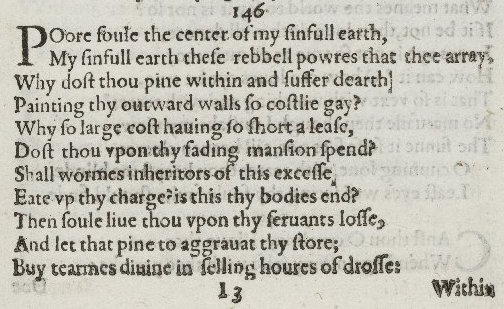
- The first eleven lines of Sonnet 146 in the 1609 Quarto
Q1
Q2
Q3
C
Poor soul, the centre of my sinful earth,
……… these rebel powers that thee array,
Why dost thou pine within and suffer dearth,
Painting thy outward walls so costly gay?
Why so large cost, having so short a lease,
Dost thou upon thy fading mansion spend?
Shall worms, inheritors of this excess,
Eat up thy charge? is this thy body’s end?
Then, soul, live thou upon thy servant’s loss,
And let that pine to aggravate thy store;
Buy terms divine in selling hours of dross;
Within be fed, without be rich no more:
So shall thou feed on Death, that feeds on men,
And Death once dead, there’s no more dying then.
—William Shakespeare
4
8
12
14

Sonnet 146, which William Shakespeare addresses to his soul, his "sinful earth", is a pleading appeal to himself to value inner qualities and satisfaction rather than outward appearance.

== Synopsis ==
Q1 The speaker addresses his soul, which he pictures as a poor or empty interior, as opposed to his body, a gaudy exterior. Q2 He questions the soul's "large cost" lavished on a body which will shortly die. Q3 Continuing his financial metaphor, he urges the soul to turn the body's inevitable loss into the soul's gain. C Thus as death feeds on men, the soul can feed on death, rendering the soul immortal.

== Structure ==
Sonnet 146 is an English or Shakespearean sonnet. The English sonnet has three quatrains, followed by a final rhyming couplet. It follows the typical rhyme scheme of the form ABAB CDCD EFEF GG and is composed in iambic pentameter, a type of poetic metre based on five pairs of metrically weak/strong syllabic positions. The 14th line exemplifies a regular iambic pentameter:

×    /    ×     /      ×      /  ×    /×     / 
And Death once dead, there's no more dying then. (146.14)

/ = ictus, a metrically strong syllabic position. × = nonictus.

The 4th line begins with a common metrical variant, the initial reversal:

 /   ×     × /   ×    /     ×  /   ×  / 
Painting thy outward walls so costly gay? (146.4)

An initial reversal also occurs in line 3, and potentially in lines 6, 8, 9, and 13. A mid-line reversal occurs in line 5. The metrical interpretations of the beginnings of lines 5 and 9 are especially dependent upon the rhetorical emphasis chosen. In line 5, any of the first three syllables could potentially take the first ictus. In line 9 any of four readings is rhetorically possible:

  /    ×     ×     /                        [initial reversal]
  ×    /     /     ×                        [2nd position reversal; rare] 
  /    ×     /     ×                        [double reversal; generally considered unmetrical]
  ×    /     ×     /  × /    ×  /  ×      / [regular] 
Then, soul, live thou upon thy servant's loss, (146.)

The relative frequency of initial reversals and regular lines, and a characteristically Shakespearean use of metrical expectations to emphasize pronouns, suggest that readings with only an initial reversal or a regular meter may be the most appropriate.

== Analysis and Criticism ==
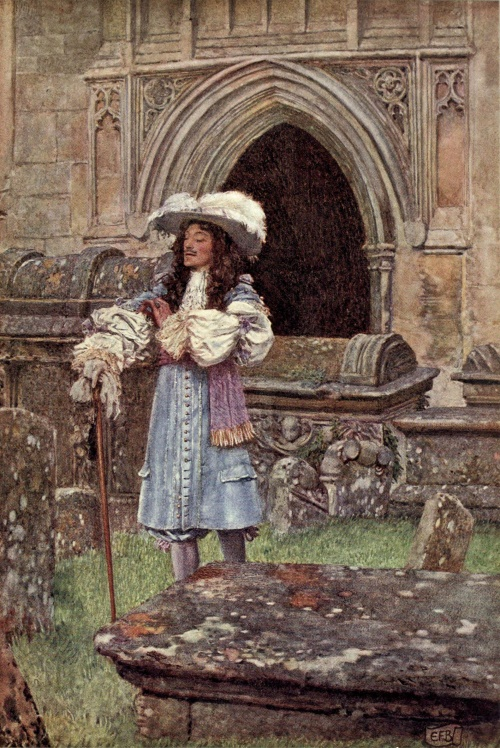
Illustration by Eleanor Fortescue-Brickdale

The sonnet is notable for its uncharacteristically religious tone and call for moral richness, whereas most sonnets treasure earthly qualities of beauty and love. In its vocabulary and vocative address to the soul the sonnet invites comparison with Psalm 146.

Although Michael West has persuasively argued that this sonnet is indebted to the medieval genre of poetic dialogues between soul and body, the extent to which sonnet actually presents conventional Christian arguments about the relationship between body and soul is a matter of considerable critical debate. John Crowe Ransom counters an older tradition of reading the sonnet in straightforward Christian terms by making the general observation that the "divine terms which the soul buys are not particularly Christian: there are few words in the poem that would directly indicate a conventional religious dogma." B.C. Southam makes an effort to build on Ransom's passing remark in a more developed argument about the sonnet which seeks to show that Shakespeare's speaker is inspired more by a "humanist" philosophy that ironically undermines a rigidly Christian "rigorous asceticism which glorifies the life of the body at the expense of the vitality and richness of sensuous experience." Southam's argument for an ironically humanist poem is countered, in turn, by Charles A. Huttar, who attempts to bring the poem back into alignment with a certain Christian worldview: for example, Huttar claims that "these rebel powers" that "array" the soul in line 2 refer not to "the physical being" or body but rather to the lower powers of the soul itself, the passions or affections. Understood in this way, the sentiment of the poem appears in accord with a certain Christian tradition that rejects "extreme asceticism".

However, in a long discussion in his edition of the sonnets, Stephen Booth critiques both Southam and Huttar as engaging in "oversimplification" Booth tries to split the difference between these critical perspectives: "It is as unreasonable and unprofitable to argue that Sonnet 146 does not espouse an orthodox Christian position on the relative value of mortal and immortal considerations as it is to deny that the poem generates the ideational static that Ransom and Southam point out." In Booth's view, conventional Christian ideas and images "coexist" with seemingly contradictory un-Christian ideas and images: "the incompatible elements, points of view, and responses . . . do not undergo synthesis". For Booth, Sonnet 146 contains multiple, sometimes conflicting, elements that cannot and should not be reduced to a singular, univocal argument about body and soul.

== Missing text ==
The missing text at the beginning of line two is generally attributed to be a printing error, since in the earliest version of the sonnet the second line begins with a repetition of the last three words of the previous lines, commonly called an eye-skip error, which breaks the iambic pentameter. Shakespeare's intention for the line is a subject of debate among scholars, with most modern scholars accepting the emendation, "feeding", based on internal evidence. Other guesses include "Thrall to", "Fool'd by", "Hemm'd by", "Foil'd by", "Fenced by", "Flatt'ring", "Spoiled by", "Lord of", and "Pressed by".

Unfortunately, none of the "guesses" seem to work. "Feeding," for example, tends to "explain the joke," and does not let the poem build to the implication that the soul itself is culpable in man's struggle for spirit over the corporal self. Perhaps a better foot would be "disrobe."
