= Sonnet 139 =

« » Sonnet 139
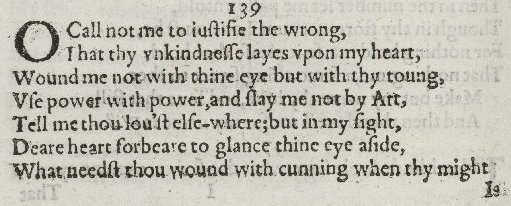
- The first seven lines of Sonnet 139 in the 1609 Quarto
Q1
Q2
Q3
C
O call not me to justify the wrong
That thy unkindness lays upon my heart;
Wound me not with thine eye, but with thy tongue;
Use power with power, and slay me not by art.
Tell me thou lov’st elsewhere; but in my sight,
Dear heart, forbear to glance thine eye aside:
What need’st thou wound with cunning, when thy might
Is more than my o’er-press’d defense can bide?
Let me excuse thee: ah, my love well knows
Her pretty looks have been mine enemies;
And therefore from my face she turns my foes,
That they elsewhere might dart their injuries:
Yet do not so; but since I am near slain,
Kill me outright with looks, and rid my pain.
—William Shakespeare
4
8
12
14

Sonnet 139 is one of 154 sonnets written by the English playwright and poet William Shakespeare.

== Structure ==
Sonnet 139 is an English or Shakespearean sonnet. The English sonnet has three quatrains, followed by a final rhyming couplet. It follows the typical rhyme scheme of the form ABAB CDCD EFEF GG and is composed in iambic pentameter, a type of poetic metre based on five pairs of metrically weak/strong syllabic positions. The 6th line exemplifies a regular iambic pentameter:

 ×    /      ×  /    ×   /      ×   /   × / 
Dear heart, forbear to glance thine eye aside: (139.6)

/ = ictus, a metrically strong syllabic position. × = nonictus.

Line 3 begins with a common metrical variation, an initial reversal:

 /     ×  ×   /     ×   /     ×   /     ×  / 
Wound me not with thine eye, but with thy tongue; (139.3)

Initial reversals also occur in lines 5 and 14, and potentially in line 9. Line 13 exhibits a rightward movement of the fourth ictus (resulting in a four-position figure, × × / /, sometimes referred to as a minor ionic):

 ×   /  ×   /   ×   /    × ×   /     / 
Yet do not so; but since I am near slain, (139.13)

The meter demands both occurrences of "power" in line 4 function as single syllables. The words "elsewhere" (lines 5 and 12) and "outright" (line 14) are double-stressed, and in this context move their stresses to the second syllable.
