= Sonnet 141 =

« » Sonnet 141
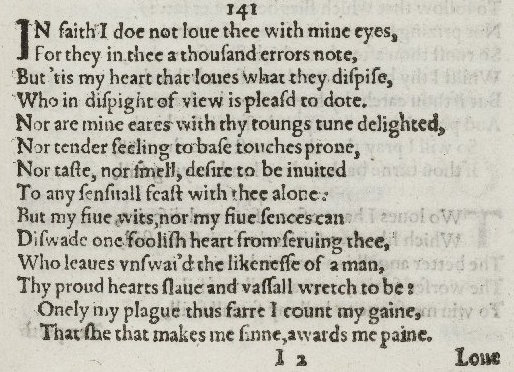
- Sonnet 141 in the 1609 Quarto
Q1
Q2
Q3
C
In faith, I do not love thee with mine eyes,
For they in thee a thousand errors note;
But ’tis my heart that loves what they despise,
Who, in despite of view, is pleas’d to dote;
Nor are mine ears with thy tongue’s tune delighted;
Nor tender feeling, to base touches prone,
Nor taste, nor smell, desire to be invited
To any sensual feast with thee alone:
But my five wits nor my five senses can
Dissuade one foolish heart from serving thee,
Who leaves unsway’d the likeness of a man,
Thy proud heart’s slave and vassal wretch to be:
Only my plague thus far I count my gain,
That she that makes me sin awards me pain.
—William Shakespeare
4
8
12
14

Sonnet 141
A reading of Sonnet 141

Sonnet 141 is the informal name given to the 141st of William Shakespeare's 154 sonnets. The theme of the sonnet is the discrepancy between the poet's physical senses and wits (intellect) on the one hand and his heart on the other. The "five wits" that are mentioned refer to the mental faculties of common sense, imagination, fantasy, instinct, and memory. The sonnet is one of several in which the poet's heart is infatuated despite what his eyes can see.

== Synopsis ==
In Sonnet 141, Shakespeare discusses his desires for the woman that conflict with what his senses tell him. He is aware of all of her physical flaws, does not enjoy her voice, smell, or touch, but his heart is still completely enthralled by her. His focus on sense is overwhelming in the poem, but his senses cannot prevent him from loving her. The pain he endures for loving her is soothing, and he feels like he is a slave to it.

== Structure ==
Sonnet 141 is an English or Shakespearean sonnet. The English sonnet has three quatrains, followed by a final rhyming couplet. It follows the typical rhyme scheme of the form ABAB CDCD EFEF GG and is composed in iambic pentameter, a type of poetic metre based on five pairs of metrically weak/strong syllabic positions. The 11th line exemplifies a regular iambic pentameter:

  ×  /     ×   /      ×  /   ×   /  ×  / 
Who leaves unsway'd the likeness of a man, (141.11)

Line 5 (potentially) exhibits all three of iambic pentameter's most common metrical variants: an initial reversal, the rightward movement of the third ictus (resulting in a four-position figure, × × / /, sometimes referred to as a minor ionic), and a final extrametrical syllable or feminine ending:

 /  ×    ×   /     ×     ×  /        /    × /  (×) 
Nor are mine ears with thy tongue's tune delighted; (141.5)

/ = ictus, a metrically strong syllabic position. × = nonictus. (×) = extrametrical syllable.

Line 7 necessarily shares line 5's feminine ending. There is also an initial reversal in line 13, and potentially in line 4. Line 6 has a minor ionic, and line 9 potentially has two.

The meter demands that line 8's "sensual" function as two syllables.

The reason for a poet's varying from a perfectly regular iambic pentameter can be several. Such variations can be added to assure a swell or fall in a particular place — to draw emphasis to a certain word or phrase that the poet would like to stress. Or, different rhythms can be used simply for variety's sake.

Sonnet 141 also exhibits a switch in tone and content at line nine. The first eight lines are primarily concerned with the speaker's mistress's imperfections, whereas the last six lines focus on the speaker's love. This switch in content is known as a volta; it is typical of the Petrarchan sonnet tradition and its influence was often still felt during Shakespeare's time, even in the composition of sonnets which (like Shakespeare's) did not follow Petrarch's rhyme scheme.

== Context ==
Though Sonnet 141 was published for the first time in the 1609 Quarto entitled, SHAKE-SPEARES SONNETS, it is not immediately clear when the poem was actually written. Scholars have attempted to date the sonnets by considering their subject, Mr. WH, as a reference point. The poems of the fair youth sequence (of which sonnet 141 is not) address a young man, one who is about 18 according to Samuel Butler. For instance, if it is to be believed that Lord Southampton is Mr. WH, then the sequence would have been started around 1591, when Lord Southampton was 18. If Mr. WH is William Pembroke, then the sonnets probably date between 1598 and 1601. However, to be any more specific than this is difficult, for there is much debate as to whether the order the sonnets in the 1609 Quarto is actually correct. Thus, we can only approximate when the sequence as a whole was begun and finished.

=== The Dark Lady ===
Sonnet 141 is part of the sequence (sonnets 127–152) directed at the so-called Dark Lady. The Dark Lady sonnets are much more sexual than their Fair Youth counterparts, and this is readily apparent in sonnet 141. Much has been made in scholarly circles about the sarcastic and abrasive tone of the dark lady sonnets. However, there has not been much consensus traditionally as to what Shakespeare's coarse tone can tell us. Some scholars have tried to equivocate Shakespeare's apparent ambivalence and distaste for women so as to downplay the homoerotic nature of the Fair Youth sequence. Others see Shakespeare's style as a response to Petrarchan sonnets in which an ideal female subject is lauded. Katherine Duncan-Jones writes "Instead of exploring the subtle and complex effect on the speaker of an obsession with a chaste and high-born lady who can never be possessed physically, 127-[1]52 offer backhanded praise of a manifestly non-aristocratic woman who is neither young, beautiful, intelligent nor chaste, but… provides a perfectly adequate outlet for male desire".

== Analysis ==
Though Sonnet 141 is seemingly focused on the speaker's mistress's physical faults, it is also part of a series in which there is much focus on the woman's promiscuity. Thus, the word "errors" in line two, in addition to referring to her physical faults, may also refer to moral errors. The phrase "base touches" in line six suggests sordid or unpleasing sexual encounters. The final phrase of line 8 "makes the sexual application clear: while a literal feast would require the presence of many guests, this is a private banquet with thee alone". "Serving" in line 10 also has a sexual connotation, as in serving a lover in "sexual obeisance". Finally, the "pain" of the last line could be mental, but it could also be physical if the speaker contracts a venereal disease.

Sonnet 141 also addresses the idea that love strips a person of identity. David West writes "In line 10 [the] heart leaves to become a vassal slave of the Black Lady, a condition [Shakespeare] has experienced already in Sonnet 133, and under the young man in Sonnets 57-8. What [the] heart leaves behind is not a man, but only the likeness of a man, 'unswayed', under no sway, with no heart to govern it". Edward Dowden provides this gloss of lines 11 and 12: "My heart ceases to govern me, and leaves me no better than the likeness of a man - a man without a heart - in order that it may become slave to thy proud heart".

Finally, the poem's couplet is often misunderstood. "The basis of the conceit here is the idea of a soul's term of imprisonment in purgatory" writes Stephen Booth. Samuel Butler provides this adept gloss: "I shall suffer less for my sin hereafter for I get some of the punishment coincidentally with the offense". However, even if we accept this meaning, writes Booth, there is still much debate as to how well the couplet relates thematically to the rest of the poem.

== See also ==
- 10 Things I Hate About You, 1999 film
