= Sonnet 149 =

« » Sonnet 149
- The first two lines of Sonnet 149 in the 1609 Quarto of Shakespeare's sonnets
Q1
Q2
Q3
C
Canst thou, O cruel! say I love thee not,
When I against myself with thee partake?
Do I not think on thee, when I forgot
Am of myself, all tyrant, for thy sake?
Who hateth thee that I do call my friend?
On whom frown’st thou that I do fawn upon?
Nay, if thou lour’st on me, do I not spend
Revenge upon myself with present moan?
What merit do I in myself respect,
That is so proud thy service to despise,
When all my best doth worship thy defect,
Commanded by the motion of thine eyes?
But, love, hate on, for now I know thy mind;
Those that can see thou lov’st, and I am blind.
—William Shakespeare
4
8
12
14

Sonnet 149 is one of 154 sonnets written by the English playwright and poet William Shakespeare. It is considered a Dark Lady sonnet, as are all from 127 to 152.

== Structure ==
Sonnet 149 is an English or Shakespearean sonnet. The English sonnet has three quatrains, followed by a final rhyming couplet. It follows the typical rhyme scheme of the form ABAB CDCD EFEF GG and is composed in iambic pentameter, a type of poetic metre based on five pairs of metrically weak/strong syllabic positions. The 8th line exemplifies a regular iambic pentameter:

 × /    × /   × /    ×     / ×    / 
Revenge upon myself with present moan? (149.8)

/ = ictus, a metrically strong syllabic position. × = nonictus.

The last line begins with a common metrical variant, an initial reversal:

  /     ×   ×   /    ×   /      ×   / ×    / 
Those that can see thou lov'st, and I am blind. (149.14)

Initial reversals are potentially present in lines 3, 4, and 14, and a mid-line reversal is potentially present in line 6.

The meter demands that line 2's "cruel" be pronounced as two syllables, and line 11's "defect" (although a noun) be stressed on the second syllable.
