= Sonnet 132 =

« » Sonnet 132
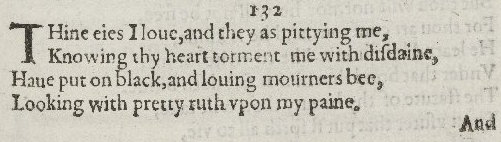
- The first stanza of Sonnet 132 in the 1609 Quarto
Q1
Q2
Q3
C
Thine eyes I love, and they, as pitying me,
Knowing thy heart torments me with disdain,
Have put on black and loving mourners be,
Looking with pretty ruth upon my pain.
And truly not the morning sun of heaven
Better becomes the grey cheeks of the east,
Nor that full star that ushers in the even
Doth half that glory to the sober west,
As those two mourning eyes become thy face:
O, let it then as well beseem thy heart
To mourn for me, since mourning doth thee grace,
And suit thy pity like in every part.
Then will I swear beauty herself is black,
And all they foul that thy complexion lack.
—William Shakespeare
4
8
12
14

Sonnet 132 is one of 154 sonnets written by the English playwright and poet William Shakespeare.

== Structure ==
Sonnet 132 is an English or Shakespearean sonnet. The English sonnet has three quatrains, followed by a final rhyming couplet. It follows the typical rhyme scheme of the form abab cdcd efef gg and is composed in iambic pentameter, a type of poetic metre based on five pairs of metrically weak/strong syllabic positions. The 3rd line exemplifies a regular iambic pentameter:

 ×    /  ×    /   ×    / ×    /   ×    / 
Have put on black and loving mourners be, (132.3)

/ = ictus, a metrically strong syllabic position. × = nonictus.

Line 13 features a mid-line reversal and, potentially, an initial reversal:

  /   ×   ×   /    /   ×  ×  /   ×    / 
Then will I swear beauty herself is black, (132.13)

Lines 2, 4, and 6 also exhibit initial reversals. Line 6 may be scanned as exhibiting a mid-line reversal; such a reversal is normally preceded by at least a slight intonational break, which "grey cheeks" does not allow. Peter Groves calls this a "harsh mapping", and recommends that in performance "the best thing to do is to prolong the subordinated S-syllable [here, "grey"] ... the effect of this is to throw a degree of emphasis on it".

Some rhythmic uncertainty at the beginning of lines 7 and 9 may be resolved by applying contrastive accent to line 7's "that" and line 9's "those", rendering both lines regular and foregrounding a characteristically Shakespearean antithetical construction.

The meter demands that line 1's "pitying" function as two syllables. Regarding lines 5 and 7's rhymes "heaven" and "even", Booth regards them as monosyllabic, whereas Kerrigan evidently reads them as disyllabic.

== Interpretations ==
- Matthew Rhys, for the 2002 compilation album, When Love Speaks (EMI Classics)
