= Sonnet 130 =

« » Sonnet 130
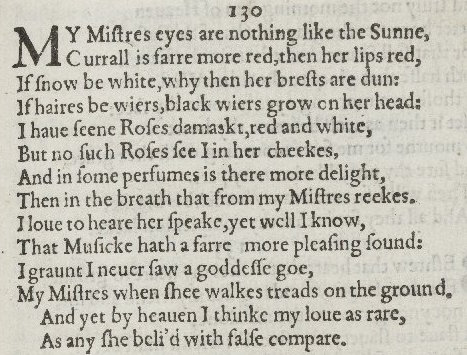
- Sonnet 130 in the 1609 Quarto
Q1
Q2
Q3
C
My mistress’ eyes are nothing like the sun
Coral is far more red than her lips’ red:
If snow be white, why then her breasts are dun;
If hairs be wires, black wires grow on her head.
I have seen roses damask’d, red and white,
But no such roses see I in her cheeks;
And in some perfumes is there more delight
Than in the breath that from my mistress reeks.
I love to hear her speak, yet well I know
That music hath a far more pleasing sound:
I grant I never saw a goddess go,
My mistress, when she walks, treads on the ground:
And yet, by heaven, I think my love as rare
As any she belied with false compare.
—William Shakespeare
4
8
12
14

Sonnet 130 is a sonnet by William Shakespeare, published in 1609 as one of his 154 sonnets. It mocks the conventions of the showy and flowery courtly sonnets in its realistic portrayal of his mistress.

== Synopsis ==
Sonnet 130 satirizes the concept of ideal beauty that was a convention of literature and art in general during the Elizabethan era. Influences originating with the poetry of ancient Greece and Rome had established a tradition of this, which continued in Europe's customs of courtly love and in courtly poetry, and the work of poets such as Petrarch. It was customary to praise the beauty of the object of one's affections with comparisons to beautiful things found in nature and heaven, such as stars in the night sky, the golden light of the rising sun, or red roses. The images conjured by Shakespeare were common ones that would have been well-recognized by a reader or listener of this sonnet.

Shakespeare satirizes the hyperbole of the allusions used by conventional poets, which even by the Elizabethan era, had become clichéd, predictable, and uninspiring. This sonnet compares the poet's mistress to a number of natural beauties; each time making a point of his mistress' obvious inadequacy in such comparisons; she cannot hope to stand up to the beauties of the natural world. The first two quatrains compare the speaker's mistress to aspects of nature, such as snow or coral; each comparison ending unflatteringly for the mistress. In the final couplet, the speaker proclaims his love for his mistress by declaring that he makes no false comparisons, the implication being that other poets do precisely that. Shakespeare's sonnet aims to do the opposite, by indicating that his mistress is the ideal person of his affections because of her genuine qualities, and that she is more worthy of his love than the paramours of other poets who are more fanciful.

== Structure ==
Sonnet 130 is an English or Shakespearean sonnet. The English sonnet has three quatrains, followed by a final rhyming couplet. It follows the typical rhyme scheme of the form ABAB CDCD EFEF GG and is composed in iambic pentameter, a type of poetic metre based on five pairs of metrically weak/strong syllabic positions. The 1st line exemplifies a regular iambic pentameter:

 ×  /   ×    /    ×    /  ×    /     ×  / 
My mistress' eyes are nothing like the sun;

 / ×  ×   /   ×    /    ×   /   ×     / 
Coral is far more red than her lips' red: (130.1-2)

/ = ictus, a metrically strong syllabic position. × = nonictus.

This is followed (in line 2, scanned above) with a common metrical variation, the initial reversal. An initial reversal is potentially present in line 8, and mid-line reversals occur in lines 4 and 12, and potentially in line 3. The beginning of line 5 is open to interpretation: it may be regular or an instance of initial reversal; however, it is most naturally scanned with the rightward movement of the first ictus (resulting in a four-position figure, × × / /, sometimes referred to as a minor ionic):

×  ×    /    / ×   / ×       /  ×     / 
I have seen roses damask'd, red and white, (130.5)

If line 2's "her" is not given contrastive accent (as is assumed above), then "than her lips' red" would also form a minor ionic.

The meter demands that line 13's "heaven" function as one syllable.

== Analysis ==
=== Sonnet 130 as a satire ===
"This sonnet plays with poetic conventions in which, for example, the mistress's eyes are compared with the sun, her lips with coral, and her cheeks with roses. His mistress, says the poet, is nothing like this conventional image, but is as lovely as any woman". Here, Barbara Mowat offers her opinion of the meaning behind Sonnet 130; this work breaks the mould to which sonnets had come to conform. Shakespeare composed a sonnet which seems to parody a great many sonnets of the time. Poets like Thomas Watson, Michael Drayton, and Barnabe Barnes were all part of this sonnet craze and each wrote sonnets proclaiming love for an almost unimaginable figure; Patrick Crutwell posits that Sonnet 130 could actually be a satire of the Thomas Watson poem "Passionate Century of Love", pointing out that the Watson poem contains all but one of the platitudes that Shakespeare is making fun of in Sonnet 130. However, E. G. Rogers points out the similarities between Watson's "Passionate Century of Love," Sonnet 130, and Richard Linche's poem collection entitled "Diella." There is a great deal of similarity between sections of the Diella poem collection and Shakespeare's "Sonnet 130", for example, in "130" we see "If hairs be wires, black wires grow on her head," where in "Diella" we see "Her hayre exceeds gold forced in the smallest wire." Each work uses a comparison of hairs to wires; while in modern sense this may seem unflattering, one could argue that Linche's work draws upon the beauty of weaving gold and that Shakespeare mocks this with harsh comparison. This, along with other similarities in textual content, leads, as E. G. Rogers points out, the critic to believe that Diella may have been the source of inspiration for both homage, by Watson's "Passionate Century of Love," and satire by Shakespeare's "Sonnet 130." The idea of satire is further enforced by the final couplet of "130" in which the speaker delivers his most expositional line: "And yet, by heaven, I think my love as rare, as any she belied with false compare." This line projects the message behind this work, demeaning the false comparisons made by many poets of the time.

=== Complimentary/derisive nature ===
According to Carl Atkins, many early editors took the sonnet at face value and believed that it was simply a disparagement of the writer's mistress. However, William Flesch believes that the poem is actually quite the opposite, and acts as a compliment. He points out that many poems of the day seem to compliment the object of the poem for qualities that they really don't have, such as snow white skin or golden hair. He states that people really don't want to be complimented on a quality they don't have, e.g. an old person doesn't want to be told they are physically young, they want to be told they are youthful, in behavior or in looks. Flesch notes that while what Shakespeare writes of can seem derisive, he is in reality complimenting qualities the mistress truly exhibits, and he ends the poem with his confession of love.

== Possible influences ==
The sonnet is one of many works of literature that references other works of literature. According to Felicia Jean Steele, Shakespeare uses Petrarchan imagery while actually undermining it at the same time. Stephen Booth agrees that Shakespeare references Petrarchan works, but Booth says that Shakespeare "gently mocks the thoughtless mechanical application of the standard Petrarchan metaphors." Steele feels much stronger about the degree in which Shakespeare is discounting Petrarchan ideas, and observes that in Sonnet 130 "Shakespeare seems to undo, discount, or invalidate nearly every Petrarchan conceit about feminine beauty employed by his fellow sonneteers." The final couplet is designed to undo the damage Shakespeare has done to his reader's faith that he indeed loves his "dusky mistress." Steele's article offers Booth's paraphrasing of the couplet: "I think that my love is as rare as any woman belied by false compare." Helen Vendler, who is also referenced in Steele's article states that the final couplet would read; "In all, by heaven, I think my love as rare/ As any she conceived for compare." All three, Steele, Booth, and Vendler, believe that in this couplet, Shakespeare is responding to Petrarchan imagery because other sonneteers actively misrepresent, or "belie" their mistress' beauty.

== See also ==
- Shakespeare's sonnets
