= Sonnet 140 =

« » Sonnet 140
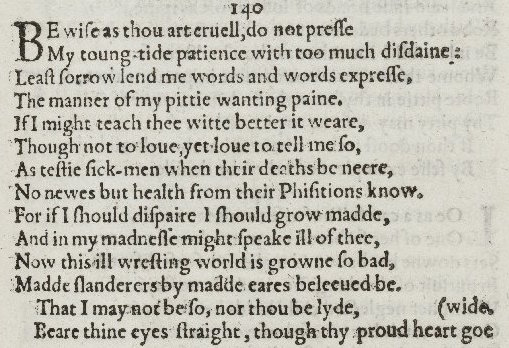
- Sonnet 140 in the 1609 Quarto
Q1
Q2
Q3
C
Be wise as thou art cruel; do not press
My tongue-tied patience with too much disdain;
Lest sorrow lend me words, and words express
The manner of my pity-wanting pain.
If I might teach thee wit, better it were,
Though not to love, yet, love, to tell me so;
As testy sick men, when their deaths be near,
No news but health from their physicians know;
For, if I should despair, I should grow mad,
And in my madness might speak ill of thee:
Now this ill-wresting world is grown so bad,
Mad slanderers by mad ears believed be.
That I may not be so, nor thou belied,
Bear thine eyes straight, though thy proud heart go wide.
—William Shakespeare
4
8
12
14

Sonnet 140 is one of 154 sonnets written by the English playwright and poet William Shakespeare. Sonnet 140 is one of the Dark Lady sonnets, in which the poet writes to a mysterious woman who rivals the Fair Youth for the poet's affection.

== Structure ==
Sonnet 140 is an English or Shakespearean sonnet. The English sonnet has three quatrains, followed by a final rhyming couplet. It follows the typical rhyme scheme of the form ABAB CDCD EFEF GG and is composed in iambic pentameter, a type of poetic metre based on five pairs of metrically weak/strong syllabic positions. The 3rd line exemplifies a regular iambic pentameter:

 ×    /  ×   /    ×  /     ×    /    ×   / 
Lest sorrow lend me words, and words express (140.3)

/ = ictus, a metrically strong syllabic position. × = nonictus.

Line 14 exhibits two common metrical variations: an initial reversal, and (potentially) the rightward movement of the third ictus (resulting in a four-position figure, × × / /, sometimes referred to as a minor ionic):

 /     ×   ×       /        ×      ×   /    /     ×  / 
Bear thine eyes straight, though thy proud heart go wide. (140.14)

A mid-line reversal is found in line 5, with potential initial reversals in lines 9 and 10. A minor ionic is present in line 12 and potentially in line 9.

The meter demands that line 12's "slanderers" function as two syllables.

== Interpretations ==
- Edward Fox, for the 2002 compilation album, When Love Speaks (EMI)
