= Sonnet 131 =

« » Sonnet 131
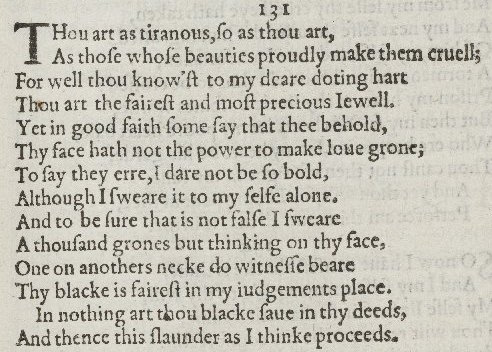
- Sonnet 131 in the 1609 Quarto
Q1
Q2
Q3
C
Thou art as tyrannous, so as thou art,
As those whose beauties proudly make them cruel;
For well thou know’st to my dear doting heart
Thou art the fairest and most precious jewel.
Yet, in good faith, some say that thee behold,
Thy face hath not the power to make love groan:
To say they err I dare not be so bold,
Although I swear it to myself alone.
And to be sure that is not false I swear,
A thousand groans, but thinking on thy face,
One on another’s neck, do witness bear
Thy black is fairest in my judgment’s place.
In nothing art thou black save in thy deeds,
And thence this slander, as I think, proceeds.
—William Shakespeare
4
8
12
14

Sonnet 131 is a sonnet written by William Shakespeare and was first published in a 1609 quarto edition titled Shakespeare's sonnets. It is a part of the Dark Lady sequence (consisting of sonnets 127–52), which are addressed to an unknown woman usually assumed to possess a dark complexion.

The sonnet, like the others in this sequence, addresses the Dark Lady as if a mistress. It references allegations from unspecified others that her "black" complexion makes her unattractive and rebuts these, but in the final two lines turns the compliment into a backhanded one by admitting that "In nothing art thou black save in thy deeds". The sonnet employs the Petrarchan conceit of "tyranny" to imply the power the object's beauty imposes over the sonneteer and argues for her beauty based on the power she exerts over him. It also uses the word "groan", another common practice from Petrarch, to superficially reinforce the lover's depth of emotion; but it does so ambivalently, possibly implying the word's connotation of pain or distress, or even its alternate meaning that refers to venereal disease.

== Structure ==
Sonnet 131 is an English or Shakespearean sonnet. The English sonnet has three quatrains, followed by a final rhyming couplet. It follows the typical rhyme scheme of the form ABAB CDCD EFEF GG and is composed in iambic pentameter, a type of poetic metre based on five pairs of metrically weak/strong syllabic positions. The 10th line exemplifies a regular iambic pentameter:

×   /  ×     /      ×    /  ×   /    ×  / 
A thousand groans, but thinking on thy face, (131.10)

Booth and Kerrigan agree that lines 2 and 4 should be construed as having a final extrametrical syllable or feminine ending. Moreover, line 4 potentially exhibits both of the other two common metrical variants: an initial reversal, and the rightward movement of the third ictus (resulting in a four-position figure, × × / /, sometimes referred to as a minor ionic):

  /  ×     ×  /  ×   ×    /     /  ×    /(×) 
Thou art the fairest and most precious jewel. (131.4)

/ = ictus, a metrically strong syllabic position. × = nonictus. (×) = extrametrical syllable.

Line 11 also features an initial reversal. Largely because of a number of one-syllable function words in the poem, several lines (1, 4, 5, and 9) have potential initial reversals, depending upon the emphasis chosen. Similarly, lines 1 and 9 potentially contain mid-line reversals, while that in line 13 is surer. Line 3 potentially contains a minor ionic.

The meter demands that line 6's "power" function as one syllable.
