= Sonnet 142 =

« » Sonnet 142
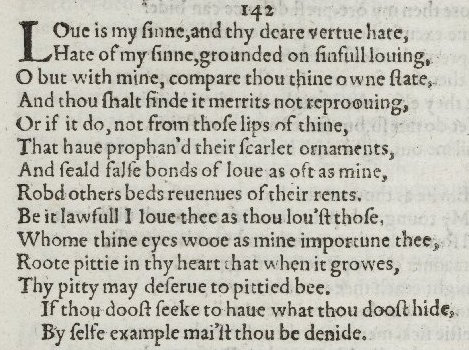
- Sonnet 142 in the 1609 Quarto
Q1
Q2
Q3
C
Love is my sin, and thy dear virtue hate,
Hate of my sin, grounded on sinful loving:
O, but with mine compare thou thine own state,
And thou shalt find it merits not reproving;
Or, if it do, not from those lips of thine,
That have profan’d their scarlet ornaments
And seal’d false bonds of love as oft as mine,
Robb’d others’ beds’ revenues of their rents.
Be it lawful I love thee, as thou lov’st those
Whom thine eyes woo as mine importune thee:
Root pity in thy heart, that, when it grows,
Thy pity may deserve to pitied be.
If thou dost seek to have what thou dost hide,
By self-example mayst thou be denied!
—William Shakespeare
4
8
12
14

Sonnet 142 is one of 154 sonnets written by the English playwright and poet William Shakespeare.

== Structure ==
Sonnet 142 is an English or Shakespearean sonnet. The English sonnet has three quatrains, followed by a final rhyming couplet. It follows the typical rhyme scheme of the form ABAB CDCD EFEF GG and is composed in iambic pentameter, a type of poetic metre based on five pairs of metrically weak/strong syllabic positions. The 14th line exemplifies a regular iambic pentameter:

 ×  /   × /  ×   /      ×   /  × / 
By self-example mayst thou be denied! (142.14)

The 2nd line contains three common metrical variants: an initial reversal, a mid-line reversal, and a final extrametrical syllable or feminine ending:

 /   ×   ×  /     /   ×  ×   /  ×   /(×) 
Hate of my sin, grounded on sinful loving: (142.2)

/ = ictus, a metrically strong syllabic position. × = nonictus. (×) = extrametrical syllable.

Line 4 necessarily shares a feminine ending. An initial reversal can also be found in line 1, and potentially in lines 3, 5, 8, and 12; another mid-line reversal can be found in line 5.

The meter demands two variant (and unusual to modern ears) pronunciations: line 8's "revenues" is stressed on the second syllable, and line 9's "Be it" functions as one syllable.

While frequently the rhythm of iambic pentameter lines arises from the implicit emphasis of its words, this sonnet affords several examples of the implicit emphasis of words arising from the meter. For example, in line 9, Shakespeare diverts the ictus away from the two strong tonic stresses of "love" and "lov'st" by arranging the line such that the meter implies contrastive accent on the four pronouns surrounding them:

 ×     /  ×  /  ×     /   ×    /   ×       / 
Be it lawful I love thee, as thou lov'st those (142.9)

== Interpretations ==
- Sylvia Syms, for the 2002 compilation album, When Love Speaks (EMI)
