= Sonnet 152 =

« » Sonnet 152
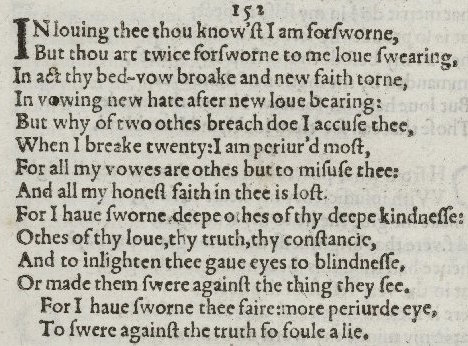
- Sonnet 152 in the 1609 Quarto
Q1
Q2
Q3
C
In loving thee thou know’st I am forsworn,
But thou art twice forsworn, to me love swearing;
In act thy bed-vow broke, and new faith torn,
In vowing new hate after new love bearing.
But why of two oaths’ breach do I accuse thee,
When I break twenty! I am perjur’d most;
For all my vows are oaths but to misuse thee,
And all my honest faith in thee is lost:
For I have sworn deep oaths of thy deep kindness,
Oaths of thy love, thy truth, thy constancy;
And, to enlighten thee, gave eyes to blindness,
Or made them swear against the thing they see;
For I have sworn thee fair; more perjur’d I,
To swear against the truth so foul a lie!
—William Shakespeare
4
8
12
14

Sonnet 152 is a sonnet by William Shakespeare. It is one of a collection of 154 sonnets, dealing with themes such as the passage of time, love, beauty and mortality, first published in a 1609.

== Synopsis ==
Although concluding the sequence of The Dark Lady sonnets (Sonnets 127-152), sonnet 152 provides no happy ending to the series. This sonnet tells of how the narrator judges his mistress, but then he realizes that he cannot judge her, as he as well has been sinful.

== Structure ==
Sonnet 152 is an English or Shakespearean sonnet. The English sonnet has three quatrains, followed by a final rhyming couplet. It follows the typical rhyme scheme of the form ABAB CDCD EFEF GG and is composed in iambic pentameter, a type of poetic metre based on five pairs of metrically weak/strong syllabic positions. The 12th line exemplifies a regular iambic pentameter:

×   /     ×    /   × /       ×   /     ×   / 
Or made them swear against the thing they see; (152.12)

The 2nd line has a final extrametrical syllable or feminine ending:

 ×    /  ×     /    ×   /     ×  /  ×     / (×)
But thou art twice forsworn, to me love swearing; (152.2)

/ = ictus, a metrically strong syllabic position. × = nonictus. (×) = extrametrical syllable.

Lines 4, 5, 7, 9, and 11 also have feminine endings. Line 10 begins with a common metrical variant, an initial reversal:

/     ×    ×  /      ×   /      ×  /   ×  / 
Oaths of thy love, thy truth, thy constancy; (152.10)

An initial reversal potentially occurs in line 11, and mid-line reversals potentially occur in lines 7 and 9.

== Interpretations ==
- Susannah York, for the 2002 compilation album, When Love Speaks (EMI Classics)
- Erminia Passannanti, “O, never say that I was false of heart”. Love pretence in William Shakespeare's Sonnets 109/110/111/151/152", Academia.edu, 2024.
