= Violence in literature =

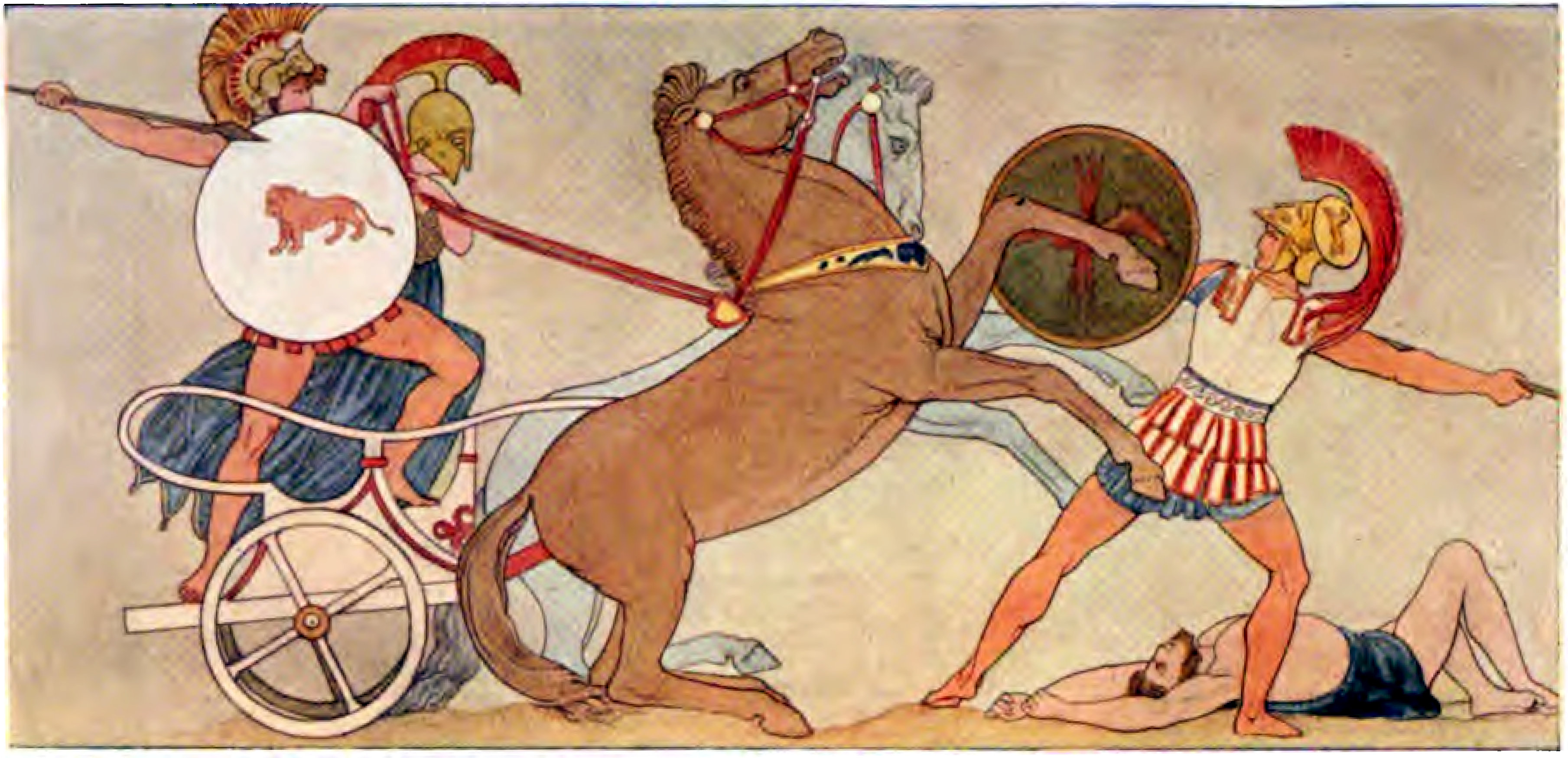
Illustration of the Trojan War from Homer's Iliad, largely regarded as one of the most violent literary texts

Violence in literature refers to the recurrent use of violence as a storytelling motif in classic and contemporary literature, both fiction and non-fiction. Depending on the nature of the narrative, violence can be represented either through graphic descriptions or psychological and emotional suffering. Historical literary eras have differed in their purposes for employing this thematic element, with some stories using it to symbolize a societal, psychological, or philosophical matter and others for the sole object of entertainment. Regardless of genre and period, literary violence has been a subject of controversy as it is often considered unethical and harmful for readers, particularly when it comes to juvenile literature.

== Historical development ==
Storytelling is an experience common to all cultures and periods. Having most likely started with cave drawings depicting humans, animals, and elements of nature in the preliterate age as far as 30,000 years ago, it has developed significantly with the use of spoken and written language. Regardless of its form, however, violence has been a prevalent developing theme throughout literary history.

=== Heroic literature ===
The earliest tales of heroic deeds and adventures were told orally in the form of epic poetry, folk songs, and prayers from one generation to another. Epics describe, in stylized and lyrical language, the adventures of a hero, often with superhuman qualities, that serve to put his character to the test. Most epics feature the interference of the concerned culture's gods and deities to either hamper or facilitate the protagonist's journey. These tales tend to be either completely fictional or a blend of fiction and history.

Epics are known for their acts of grand-scale brutality. Recognized as the most ancient of literary texts, The Sumerian Epic of Gilgamesh (c. 2150 – 1400 BCE), discovered on clay tablets, begins with its protagonist king, corrupted by power, incessantly abusing his people; killing men and assaulting women. Themes of slaughter, sacrifice, rivalry, disease, and natural disasters are described throughout his quest for eternal life. Some acts of violence appear to be committed for the sake of glory and fame, such as the brutal duel between Gilgamesh and Enkidu for kingdom over the Babylonian land, whereas others have a greater significance to the plot.

Later epics from different cultures displayed similar, if more magnified, violence to relate their characters' struggles. Homer's Iliad, known approximately 1500 years after Gilgamesh, recounts the ten-year Trojan War with descriptions of one warrior's grisly slaughter after the other. In addition to the graphic imagery, these deaths are often indicated with metaphorical language, such as a darkness setting upon the victim's eyes or pouring about the body. Yet of the most violent features in the epic is Achilles's manhandling of Hector's body in a display of the utter inhumanity of war; it is left to be mauled by dogs and scavenging birds, then stabbed by other Achaeans, only to be, at last, dragged around by his killer's chariot. The suffering, nevertheless, is not only physical but also emotional, an example of which being the psychological torment Helen is subject to as she blames herself for starting the war. This epic's sequel, the Odyssey, does not fall short in its share of violence. During a ten-year journey, the protagonist is forced to witness his men suffer terrible fates as brutal storms are sent their way and they, upon landing on a variety of islands, are attacked by their inhabitants. For example, Sicily's Polyphemus, one-eyed giant son of Poseidon, eats his crew alive – two at a time. Later, cannibalistic Laestrygonians annihilate all the ships save Odysseus's and, landing on Aeaea next, his men are turned to swine by the enchantress Circe.

Generally, violence in epics presents itself as a truth and way of life that a person may follow either for goodness or evil. It is also used as a device to convey the society's cultural value of reverence and respect for their deities; any act of disobedience or offense is punishable by the concerned deity. For instance, in the Odyssey, Zeus destroys the surviving crew, except for Odysseus, when they transgress by slaughtering the sacred cattle of the sun. Another reason for the excessive display of violence, in addition to representing the darkness of human nature and the adversities of social conflicts, is characterization. Since an epic portrays the trials inflicted upon a hero, that these trials include physical and emotional violence serves to demonstrate the strength, control, and resilience expected from him.

=== Religious literature ===
Early Abrahamic scriptures, believed to have been predated by the aforementioned Epic of Gilgamesh, include stories of God sending his punishments upon transgressors and of humans inflicting each other with harm. A common narrative is the destruction of the cities Sodom and Gomorrah, though religious interpretations differ on the nature of the notorious sin committed by their people and the way they were destroyed. In Genesis (19:24), they are annihilated with "sulfur and fire" and Lot's wife who, despite being warned of the incoming disaster, remains behind with the wicked and is turned into a "pillar of salt". The Quran does not mention the cities by name, but the story of the prophet Lot describes a similar account, where the cities are demolished by stones raining down. Jewish, Christian, and Islamic literature mention various instances of natural calamities sent to penalize oppressors and sinners; the Red Sea, after being split by Moses to allow for his and his people's safe passage, floods the land and drowns Pharaoh's army. Fires, volcanic eruptions, windstorms, droughts, and earthquakes are also mentioned in several holy book chapters.

As for human-induced violence, the story of Cain and Abel (first sons of Adam and Eve) describes the first murder committed upon the Earth, and is virtually the same in all three religions: Cain's sacrifices to God are rejected but his brother's accepted, and out of jealousy, the first slays the latter. Other accounts of human-induced brutality include descriptions of battle, conquest, sacrifice, imprisonment, stoning, and crucifixion – among others. Typically, these accounts serve to not only educate the followers of the religions about previous nations but to warn them of the darkness of human nature as well as the consequence of sin, oppression, and God's power.

=== Gothic literature ===
The Romantic (c. 1790 – 1830) and Victorian (c. 1832 – 1901) periods revolutionized the use of violence and suffering as literary themes with the introduction of the gothic genre. Perceived as dark romanticism with a focus on the evil side of humanity, gothic fiction is aestheticized with elements of fear, mystery, degeneration, and haunting. It employs dark settings (typically old houses and castles haunted by an ominous past or owned by villainous characters, and designed with intricate gothic architecture from which the genre draws its name) and supernatural devices to draw on emotional extremes and convey a general atmosphere of dread. Violent events, such as murder and torture, are typical plot elements that are often symbolic of issues of social injustice and corruption, as well as personal and psychological struggles. The genre was inadvertently founded by English author Horace Walpole who, being the first to use the word "gothic" in a title for his 1764 novel The Castle of Otranto: A Gothic Story, originally intended it to mean "barbarous" or "of the Middle Ages". It quickly earned popularity in Europe, then America, and some of its notable contributors include Ann Radcliffe, Matthew Lewis, and Charles Brockden Brown in the 18th century, then Robert Louis Stevenson, Bram Stoker, Mary Shelley, and Edgar Allan Poe in the 19th.

As the first known gothic tale, Walpole's novel features violence that is both realistic and fantastical. Physical harm is mostly attributed to human or material causes; like the graphic death of the protagonist Manfred's son by a gigantic helmet that falls and crushes him on his wedding day. Other instances include sexual assault, bloody knight duels, abuse by oppressive authorities, and the climactic yet accidental fatal stabbing of Matilda. On the other hand, the psychological torment experienced by the characters is mostly due to supernatural characters and elements. For example, Manfred is throughout the novel mercilessly haunted by his grandfather's ghost, and several of his actions and decisions, especially those of violent nature, are driven by the constant fear of ancient magical prophecies. It is, after all, a prophecy which predicts the loss of kingdom after his son's death that pushes Manfred to attempt raping Isabella and, later, murdering her. His efforts remain unsuccessful, however, as he mistakes Matilda for her and ends up killing his own daughter. The novel's gothic aspects – gruesome violence, emotional abuse, mystic scenery, and details of setting such as medieval architecture, secret passages, and animated portraits – inspired contemporary and later authors to imitate, reform, and develop the genre.

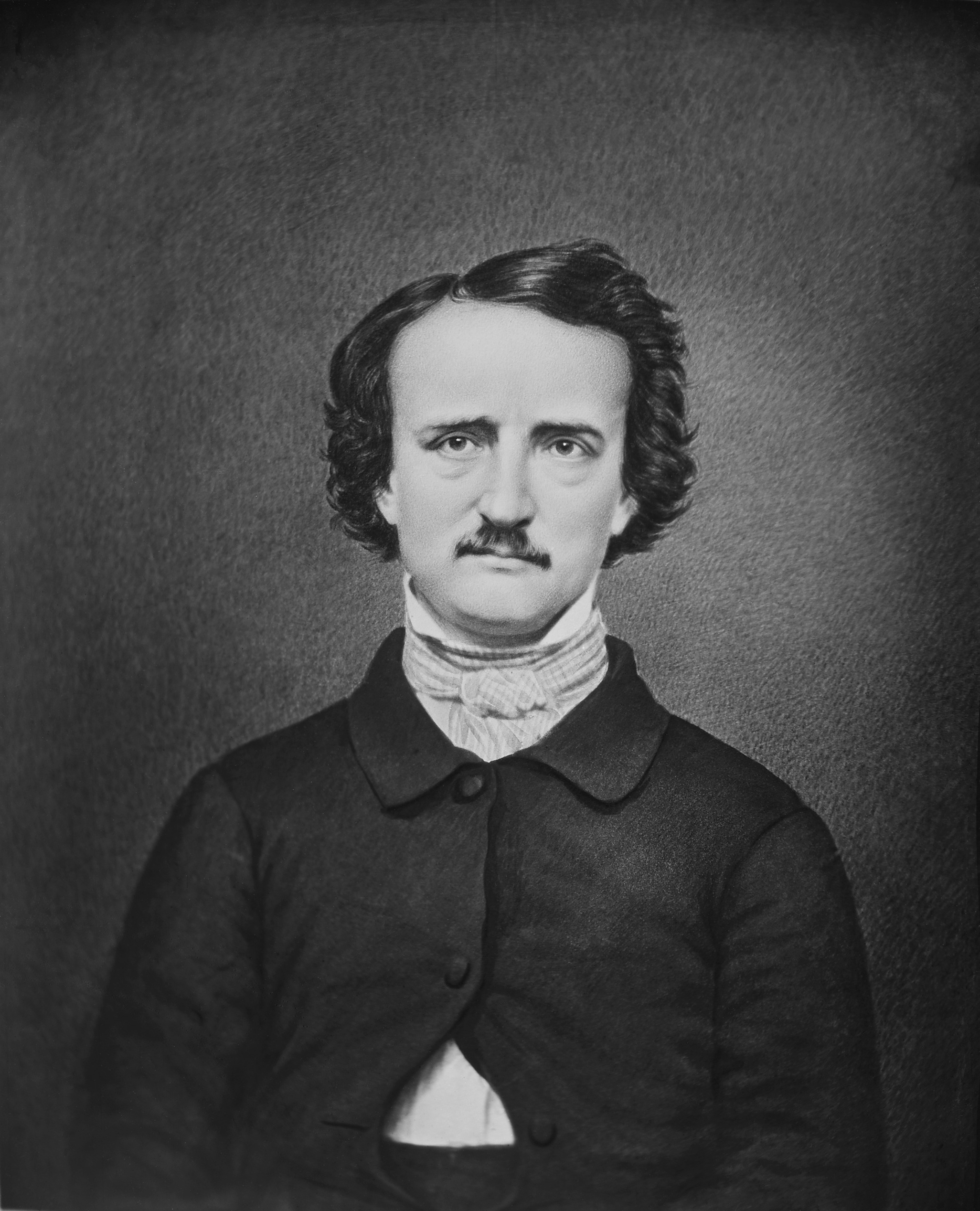
American author Edgar Allan Poe. He is named the father of American gothic literature and an inspiration for future horror writers.

Shelley's Frankenstein, for example, takes it on differently. Employing gothic elements in her story, she utilizes violence for a purpose other than representing the dark, unrestricted cunning of humanity or the desire for honor and kingship. Instead, the monster's brutal behavior (first, second, and third-degree murders) is motivated by experiences and emotions that are often at the root of human psychological and depressive issues. The creation is abandoned by its scientist and left to fend for itself, but society only shuns and neglects it. The feelings of rejection and loneliness fuel its anger and in turn its temptation to harm others, according to this line spoken by the character: "This passion is detrimental to me, for you do not reflect that you are the cause of its excess" (Shelley 157). Within the gothic framework, Shelley therefore gave literary violence a new utility: it can be reflective of the flaws of human nature and society – a symbol for the emotional suffering caused by social neglect and injustice. Moreover, Frankenstein introduced the idea that knowledge – particularly the scientific – can be used as a weapon for evil just as for good. This concept dominated later works of fiction, especially within the speculative type.

But Poe, who was arguably the father of American gothic literature and the inspiration for future horror authors, innovated the genre further by focusing on human psyche and showing that true horror comes from the mind and soul. Though several of his tales consist of graphic descriptions, it is his focus on the characters' psychological trauma and twisted mentalities, supported by the presence of supernatural elements and reflected in intricate and suspenseful descriptions of setting, that heightens their horror. In "The Fall of the House of Usher", Poe instantly establishes a gothic setting: outside the old and decaying castle is a violent storm, and inside are mystifying damp rooms visited by the corpse of Madeline. The disintegration of the family estate house is symbolic of Roderick and Madeline's unstable mental and physical states; when they die in the end, the house, as described by the narrator, splits into two fragments that sink into the lake. Roderick's deteriorating condition may be explanatory of the supernatural aspects of the story; in other words, that it is his illness that makes him believe the house is haunted and that his sister is back from the dead. Regardless, the horror in the tale remains in the fact that such suffering is transcendental; a truth in the lives of some and a possibility in the lives of all. He creates suspense in his readers not with gory and bloody details, but with explorations of the human mind and the dangers it may cause or fall into. As a precursor to horror genres popular today, gothic fiction in the Romantic and Victorian eras therefore employed violence that took on connotations beyond glory as in most epics and the spiritual purposes in religious literature.

=== Modern and contemporary literature ===
The modern era (c. 1914 – 1945) is characterized by a surge in popularity of literary genres often reputable for their violence. Crime and detective fiction, for instance, though having been published earlier in the 19th century in works such as Arthur Conan Doyle's The Adventures of Sherlock Holmes and Poe's "The Murders in the Rue Morgue", saw heightened success in the period between the two world wars. This duration, known as the Golden Age of Detective Fiction, is marked with the emergence of celebrated authors like Agatha Christie and Dorothy L. Sayers. In such stories, the protagonist investigates clues to a criminal case which, most often, is murder – and it varies in degree of brutality from one tale to another. In Christie's debut novel, The Mysterious Affair at Styles, the victim suffers a quick death by strychnine poisoning. In other tales, her characters die from stabbings, strangulations, gunshot wounds, blows to the head, acid consumption – among other ways. Hercule Poirot's Christmas ranks as one of her most violent volumes; its victim, multi-millionaire Simeon Lee, has his throat slit open and is left lying in a pool of blood inside his room with broken and flipped over furniture.

What distinguishes these "whodunnit" tales is the fact that the violent act and its connotation are usually not the focus of the plot; rather, it is the circumstances leading up to the crime as well as the identity of the culprit that concern the detective protagonist. With the implications of the offence often being ignored, these stories may be said to use violence solely to display the protagonist's intelligence. For this reason, Foster (2003) in his book How to Read Literature Like a Professor considers that violence in crime fiction is mostly meaningless. The victim is killed off early on in the story, which gives the readers no chance to develop a liking or emotional attachment to them. And because these narratives typically end the same way (the guilty found and the crime solved), the initial violence is given no true weight beyond its advancement of the plot. Yet, in dealing with the dark side of humanity, these stories may offer readers a sense of hope that no crime can go unpunished.

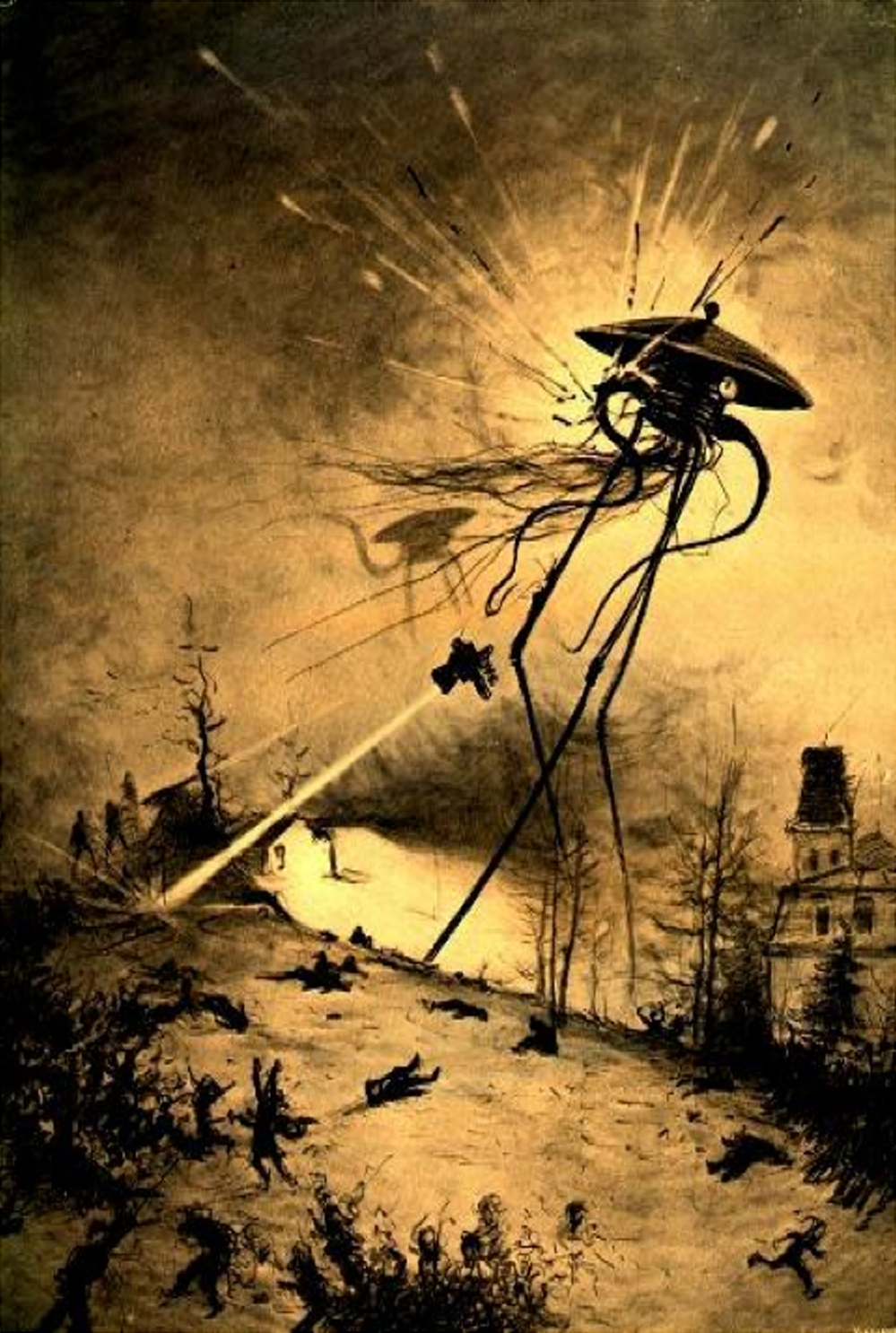
The War of the Worlds by H.G. Wells. Illustration depicting a man versus machine conflict.

Another genre that grew significantly in this period is science fiction, with authors like Isaac Asimov and Arthur C. Clarke beginning to earn recognition for their work. As it deals with imaginative futuristic scenarios, common themes in science fiction include extraterrestrial discoveries, space wars, time travelling, alternate realities, and technological advancements such as artificial intelligence. Stories of this genre, especially those set in an apocalyptic Earth, depict the extremes of human violence toward nature and themselves. In Ray Bradbury's The Martian Chronicles, human conflict gives rise to a destructive nuclear war that leaves the planet uninhabitable and settlement on Mars a necessity. A similar conflict later arises on that planet, however, leading to the annihilation of Martian civilizations as well. Colonization, environmental destruction, and genocide of innocent nations are human transgressions facilitated by innovations in technology. Violence in these stories often serves to picture the future; with depletion of resources, growing populations, and the advancement of science, human characters are usually written to give in to desperation by letting go of their humanity in a battle for survival of the fittest either against each other or foreign creatures. But by depicting wars between creatures of different race (typically humans versus aliens or robots), science fiction authors assert violence as a truth of life not limited to humans.

Contemporary literature (c. 1950 – present day) has branched into several specific subgenres. Speculative fiction (horror, science fiction, and fantasy), for example, can be particularly or a mixture of occult, paranormal, post-apocalyptic, gothic, dystopian, cyberpunk, steampunk, urban fantasy, magic realism – among other types. Notable contributors include Neil Gaiman, Stephen King, Kurt Vonnegut, and Ray Bradbury – and most of their writing maintains, if not magnifies, the types of physical and emotional violence encountered in past fiction.

Most modern and present-day narratives have, however, introduced the idea that violence can be sought out for pleasure and entertainment. Studies have shown that the constant exposure to violence not only in literature but also film and television has created a fascination with brutality. The audience is thus likely to select a violent story over a non-violent one, since those based in imaginary worlds where reality's moral limitations do not exist have been reported to offer them a sense of satisfaction.

== Categories of literary violence ==
Conflict is an essential element of narration that creates the tension necessary to advance a plot. It can be an internal struggle with one's own thoughts and emotions, or external; between a character and nature, other characters, or society as a whole. Unresolved conflicts, regardless of the type, can result in violence. Fiction maintains depictions of violence to expose the basic conflicts in social relationships and in turn provide readers with an understanding of both personal and collective life experiences. In his book How to Read Literature Like a Professor, Foster (2003) classifies fictional violence into two categories: authorial and character-imposed.

=== Authorial violence ===
Authorial or narrative violence is defined as the suffering caused with no character as a direct or indirect perpetrator; no one except the author is responsible for it. Typically, it is nature or disease that brings about this danger. In addition to progressing the storyline, its purpose is to generate hardships that ensure the characters' development by testing their values, motivations, and fears.

In character versus nature conflicts common but not limited to adventure stories, the resistance can be produced by an animal, the weather, or natural disasters. These situations tend to initiate an internal, emotional struggle within human characters as they either come to reject or acknowledge their helplessness in face of the natural world. In case of rejection, the human is often plagued with an overestimation of their power and a vengeful desire against the source of their misery. This conflict may develop a pathological need for revenge that can lead to the self-destructive and violent tendencies normally suppressed by the character's sense of morality. Melville's Moby-Dick presents a good example; Captain Ahab's persistent persecution of the whale that bit off his leg leads to his and the ship crew's deaths. Even though he had, on multiple occasions, the opportunity to surrender and accept his defeat, he remained obsessed with revenge in a clear, personal struggle with anger and pride. His development is thus characterized by a loss of reason and a gradual descent to the instinctiveness of the very animal he hunted. However, characters who, under similar circumstances, come to terms with their vulnerability respond differently: they fight as necessary for survival, but do not take their rivalry with nature further. This can be either because of the principles they hold or the impossibility of revenge, as is the case with natural disasters like earthquakes, volcanic eruptions, hurricanes, and fierce storms.

But natural violence is not always authorial, for characters can facilitate or even induce catastrophes. This is relevant, for example, to disasters sent by gods in mythological narratives. Because these gods are active characters in the story, the harm they cause, even if embodied by elements of nature, is instead character-imposed. An example is in Homer's Odyssey; menacing storms are cast at Odysseus by Poseidon as a form of divine justice following the protagonist's stabbing of his son's eye.

Because violence is understood as the harm that injures, destroys, or kills, disease can be included in its definition. In fiction, the ruling as to whether sickness is authorial is similar to that for nature. Heart attacks, strokes, and other types of sudden afflictions may or may not be incidental. In Agatha Christie's The Mysterious Affair at Styles, Mrs. Inglethorp dies of a seizure caused by criminal strychnine poisoning – here, the affliction is character-imposed as opposed to naturally occurring. Long-term illnesses follow the same process as they might be, as in various science fiction stories, artificially created. Richard Matheson's I Am Legend, for example, concerns a man-made plague that transforms humans into cannibalistic mutants.

=== Character-imposed violence ===
As its name implies, this type of violence is inflicted on the part of the characters either on themselves or others. A character versus self conflict, in which the person struggles internally with contradicting beliefs and desires, may further develop into unstable mental states that manifest physically through, on the one hand, self-injury and suicide. Psychologist Steven Pinker claims that violence results from a lack of self-control, and empirical research has shown that some people resort to aggressive behavior to relieve their stress; an attempt at emotion-regulation to attain a temporary but alleviating sense of self-agency. In a situation of suicide, however, the act is often perceived as a means to achieve permanent and ultimate relief from life's stressors. From this understanding, self-imposed harm occurs when the individual, incapable of peacefully resolving the inner disturbance, expresses it externally – but, restricted by society's moral standards, is forced to direct their aggression to themselves. Literature has had a plethora of suicide cases; the most notable including Anna Karenina's throwing of herself under a train.

On the other hand, a character who transgresses social principles imposes this harm on others. It can come in forms of psychological or physical abuse and, in extreme cases, murder – the target of which ranging from a single character to an entire community. Common large-scale violence in literature takes place in situations of war, colonization, and serial killer sprees. Shootings, stabbings, and poisonings are few examples of how such character versus other violence – rising from an underlying conflict with the self – can manifest.

Though character versus nature conflicts tend to present humans as the victims of natural disasters, a variety of dystopian works portrays them as the aggressors in a form of violence termed ecocide. Defined as the mass destruction of the environment through intentional or neglectful behavior, ecocide by immoderate resource exploitation as well as human-caused climate change and life extinction is displayed not as a background event but the root cause of apocalyptic scenarios in modern speculative novels. Octavia E. Butler's sci-fi novel Parable of the Sower, for instance, is set in a dystopian Earth suffering from constant droughts and rising floods following its people's persistent damaging of nature and subsequent contributions to global warming. Such narratives have garnered the attention and support of nature advocates as they present a creative and popular medium, especially for young people, to establish an ecocritical discourse and raise awareness about human responsibility toward the environment.

From a psychodynamic perspective, aggression is a natural human instinct as is the desire for pleasure. Sigmund Freud, pioneer of psychoanalysis, considers that violence happens as an expression of the id; the part of the psyche that demands the execution of motivations. Because the ego (the rational self) and superego (the self-critical conscience consisting of social and moral standards) work on suppressing desires, this repression creates an emotional disturbance that generates aggressive tendencies which, depending on the individual's temperament, is subdued with a variety of coping mechanisms. Common defense strategies include denial (the refusal to accept the upsetting reality), displacement (the directing of anger toward people or things that feel unthreatening), and sublimation (the distracting of one's thoughts by engaging in physical or entertaining activity). In other words, aggression cannot be eliminated – for it is a part of humanity – but it can be controlled through catharsis (the release of emotions) using the mentioned strategies. However, failure to use any of these safe mechanisms can result in violence against one's self or others.

This understanding of internal conflict is commonly used in storytelling for character building. Every narrative starts with a problem; an obstacle inhibiting the protagonist's plans and motivations. Such impediment is often embodied by a second character – the antagonist – and presents itself as the stressor that needs to be eliminated. The enmity established between these characters thus becomes the protagonist's main concern, and the way it is resolved (whether peacefully or violently) reflects these characters' inherent qualities. In several tales, the rivalry is settled with violence; a battle or duel between the two sides that claims the life of, typically, the villain. This resolution gives it a happy ending characterized by the protagonist's fulfillment of the initial motivation through the elimination of its inhibitor. Throughout the Harry Potter series, for instance, Harry's main desire is to avenge his parents and keep his loved ones safe. When this desire is constantly challenged by his arch enemy's growing power and the killing of his friends, anger builds up inside him until he extinguishes it by defeating Voldemort in a violent wizarding war. At the end of the narrative, Harry earns the satisfaction of having accomplished his deepest wish by not only having avenged his parents but also building a loving family. Following the definitions of id, ego, and superego mentioned above, critical readings have supposed that Harry's id was unsuccessfully suppressed; his decision to fight and use violence despite the great losses he suffered in the war represents the id's transgression of both the ego and superego. Nevertheless, his uncontrolled desire for revenge revealed, through the course of the series, his qualities of undeterred determination, cunning, compassion, and bravery.

== Representations of violence in literature ==
=== Graphic violence ===
Although the term graphic violence is commonly used for visual artistic media like film and television, it can relate to literature due to vivid, gory descriptions of death and injury in several stories. Such evocative imagery is the hallmark of fiction in the speculative genre, particularly horror, but not restricted to it. Settings that might exhibit these images include apocalypses, wars, and conquests.

In zombie apocalypse narratives, for example, the cannibalistic nature of the undead humans renders the incorporation of grisly details elemental. In addition to the elaborate descriptions of the decaying, mutilated bodies of individuals affected by the plague, the suffering accompanying an infection and the subsequent transformation into a zombie, as well as the process of being eaten alive can be equally, if not more, unsettling for readers. In these situations, blood and gore are typical elements used to depict the pain and sheer horror the inflicted character goes through. Famous contemporary stories of this type include World War Z and Pride and Prejudice and Zombies – a parody of Jane Austen's Pride and Prejudice set in a deadly, dystopian 19th-century Britain. However, horror authors such as Stephen King have shown that the dead need not come back to terrorize the living in order to utilize graphic violence. His book Misery follows a best-selling novelist in ordinary, modern-day Colorado. It showcases his psychological and physical torture by a fan of his work, Annie Wilkes, and in one of its climactic scenes, Wilkes chops his foot off with an axe then uses a propane torch to cauterize the wound. Horror, as a literary genre, falls under the title of affective fiction; that is, fiction which attempts to elicit an emotional reaction in its readers. As its name implies, authors in this genre aim at evoking feelings of fear, terror, and disgust that mirror those of the characters inside the story – and graphic violence is one of the ways to achieve that. And though fear is deemed a negative emotion, psychological research has shown that the rush of adrenaline it causes can be pleasurable; pleasure, ultimately, can lead to addiction. These results thus explain the allure of graphic violence – fiction of this type, whether visual or literary, is often sought out over non-violent works for entertainment purposes.

War tales that employ similar violence, however, try to achieve a goal beyond the evoking of excitement. By describing unspeakable war crimes, authors depict the suffering felt by innocent people whose pleas go unheard. It is a means to compel empathy in readers for those affected by the psychological and physical agonies of armed conflict. Aleksandar Hemon's short story "A Coin", told through letters sent by a journalist named Aida in Sarajevo to the narrator in Chicago, describes the horrors of the Bosnian 1990s war using explicit violence. In one of its passages, for instance, Aida relates having witnessed a dog chew off her deceased aunt's hand and carry it away in its jaw. Snipers shooting from buildings are characterized as vicious and inhumane, as the following lines describe:

On days when snipers are particularly rabid, there are scattered bodies as well. Some of them may still be alive and twitching toward the distant cover, leaving a bloody trail behind, like snails. People seldom try to help them, for everybody knows that the snipers are just waiting for that. Sometimes a sniper mercifully finishes off the crawling person. Sometimes the snipers play with the body, shooting off his or her knees, feet, or elbows. They seem to have made a bet how far he or she is going to get before bleeding away.

Yet readings of this story have questioned the reliability of its narrator. Because he confesses not receiving any more letters from Aida at a certain point in time and having to resort to imagining what is happening in the war, it is speculated that his long-distance interactions with her never took place; even so, that Aida herself is not real and thus all the recounting about the war was merely a product of his imagination. This is because someone witnessing such incidents, like Aida, is likely to suppress them as a coping mechanism. Another contributor to this interpretation is his apparent, unstable mental state; he is plagued with longing for Sarajevo and the isolation of immigration, and his deteriorating condition is displayed physically when he mercilessly kills then mutilates a cockroach. This, in turn, raises the question as to whether violence is a product of a mental affliction, and if, in fiction, violent characters are symbolic of underlying psychological conditions.

A variety of literary characters appear to support this idea: Misery Annie Wilkes is believed to have bipolar disorder with manic psychosis, and Kurtz from Joseph Conrad's Heart of Darkness, who is known to have decapitated African slaves and displayed their heads for decoration, is characterized by insanity. Conrad's tale, though controversial with regards to its true purpose, exposes the violence that is part of a colonial system – a source of rape, assassination, human and natural exploitation, and other crimes. While told by a sailor named Marlow, the story depicts Kurtz's descent into madness as he is gradually corrupted by power. His mental state gives rise to atrocious brutality against the innocent Africans under his rule.

Research has shown, nevertheless, that although individuals with serious mental illnesses, such as bipolar disorder, are more likely than unaffected people to commit violent acts, they are more often than not the victims – not the perpetrators. In cases that they do exhibit violence, however, other factors unrelated to their condition can be at the root of it; the environment, its people, and the way they are treated. Therefore, as with real people, violent characters are not necessarily ill and, likewise, characters who are mentally ill are not necessarily violent. It is argued that, by making these assumptions about fictional characters, those affected in reality might become stigmatized by society and their conditions severely misunderstood. Thus, literary violence may or may not be an allegory of psychological disorders.

=== Psychological violence ===
Psychological violence refers to the emotional harm that results from threats, manipulation, neglect, verbal abuse, harassment, isolation, or intimidation. In fiction, these types of aggression are used to intensify a rivalry between two or more characters; conflicts typically begin with such instances before any physical harm occurs. Mental conditions may also come as sources of a character's psychological pain, but is normally authorial in nature and forms a salient trait that interferes with their decisions and actions. Possibly every work of literature consists of emotional struggles used to depict a character's suffering. In some cases, this aggression can be relational; in the sense that one's relationships or social standing is damaged as a result of the concerned psychological affliction, whether character-imposed or authorial.

Charlotte Perkins Gilman's short story "The Yellow Wallpaper" serves as a good example of psychological violence inflicted by both a mental condition and other characters. Its narrator is a young woman suffering from postpartum depression, and though it causes her significant distress, her pain is heightened by her husband and doctor's neglect and underestimation of her situation. Overlooking its gravity, they term it a "temporary nervous depression" and force her into the rest cure which deprives her of any form of activity or entertainment as well as others' company – severing her relationships and isolating her from the world. Throughout the narrative, she gradually spirals into madness by growing more and more obsessed with her room's yellow wallpaper. Her story, and others that demonstrate psychological suffering, express that it can be as damaging as physical violence.

== Symbolism ==
Literary violence has been used, over the course of history, as an allegory of the complexities of human communication and relationships – a representation of unresolved social conflicts. Tales of epic poetry, for instance, have demonstrated the extremes people may commit to remain loyal to and defend their community, especially in a war scenario. Gothic literature then revolutionized the purpose of violence by using it to illustrate internal and emotional suffering as well as the imperfections of society and humanity as a whole.

It has been pointed out, however, that violence can be symbolic of either the sentiment of love or the consequences of its deprivation. In case of the first, two types of love are addressed: the genuine and the toxic. When a character is truly passionate of someone, aggression may be a means through which they can ensure their safety – particularly in face of danger – or happiness. Literature has seen a fair share of characters killing a person or more, or even sacrificing themselves, to keep a loved one protected. Such violence is regarded by readers as justifiable and, often, heroic. In Robert Kirkman's The Walking Dead (Volume 10, Issue #57), for instance, protagonist Rick Grimes repeatedly stabs then disembowels his child's would-be rapist. Though Carl, the child, is left horrified with this behavior he is later reassured that it was done out of compassion – and readers similarly view this incident as Rick's most violent act yet of the strongest displays of protectiveness and love for his son.

Yet, psychological research has shown that compassion often works as a successful inhibitor of violent tendencies. Following this logic, literary violence may be said to symbolize a lack of compassion in the character committing the act. In Mary Shelley's Frankenstein, for example, the monster is abandoned by his creator and shunned by society, therefore deprived of affection, and it in turn leads to several of his homicidal crimes.

In addition, literary violence can serve as a protest against real-life violence; as a metaphor for the meaninglessness and ugliness of man's inhumanity. Shirley Jackson's "The Lottery", which depicts a brutal stoning ritual that claims the life of an innocent townsperson each year, was intentionally written to expose the pointless violence of everyday life and the potential harms of scapegoating. Generally defined as the blaming of someone for the crimes of somebody else, the term scapegoating has its origins in the 16th century when Jewish rituals consisted of slaughtering animals as a form of cleansing from sins or a supplication for blessings. In Jackson's dystopian short story, the victim of the lottery is a representation of modern-day scapegoating; the oppression and marginalization of social groups as an attempt to conceal the faults of others, typically those in power. Tessie Hutchinson's unacknowledged pleas for mercy as she is to get stoned by her community can therefore symbolize the unheard voices of oppressed individuals seeking fair treatment and justice. In his Marxist reading of this narrative, Kosenko (1985) postulates that the violence therein is an attack on capitalism; Mr. Summers, who runs the lottery, represents an oppressive authority whereas the townspeople are the weak under his control. It is possible that Mr. Summers knows which paper possesses the black dot in order to keep his and other powerful families safe, meaning that the public is led to blindly believe in the democracy and fairness of the ritual when it was probably an act of discriminative selection. Jackson, therefore, appears to be criticizing senseless violence executed by authority to maintain a capitalist social order that keeps those in power above the common people.

== Violence in children's literature ==
Violence has been a regular element of children's fiction since time immemorial. In spite of it being originally used as a didactic component of storytelling, it has been toned down or completely removed from the earliest versions of some classic fairy tales, particularly the Grimm Brothers'. In the first versions of the Cinderella story, for instance, the stepsisters make striking attempts at earning the love of the prince by chopping off parts of their feet until they fit in the slipper. Still, they get rejected due to their bloodied appearance.

=== Perceptions ===
Those who oppose the use of violence in children's tales worry it can inspire them to commit similar acts in real life. They support this argument with psychologist Albert Bandura's social learning theory, which states that aggression is not a natural, but imitated, behavior. According to Bandura, viewing aggressive behavior makes it likely that the viewer will copy it, especially if such behavior is positively reinforced. His famous 1961 Bobo Doll experiment successfully illustrates his hypothesis. In this study, 24 children were exposed to a model in which an adult violently interacted with the doll by punching it, hitting it with a hammer, and tossing it around. When later put in seclusion with the same toy, these children were observed to make similar and more aggressive stances toward it compared to those who had watched a non-violent experimental model.

Today's fiction typically normalizes, if not glorifies, the punishing and killing of an antagonist. A common concern among parents is that their kids may fail to differentiate fantasy from reality and that, realizing that the hero is praised for violently defeating the enemy, would believe this type of conduct to be acceptable or even recommended.

On the other hand, proponents for the inclusion of aggression argue that literary or media violence is often not to blame for children's delinquency because they are perfectly capable of distinguishing fiction from real life. If a child engages in aggressive behavior, therefore, it is likely attributed to a variety of other factors, such as their genetics, upbringing, living conditions, and nature of surrounding relationships. In refuting the imitation theory, they state that violent tendencies are a natural aspect of human nature and, regardless of the continuous censorship and parents' attempts at sheltering their kids from media violence, children remain imaginative enough to generate aggressive scenarios and express them in their recreational activities, such as pretend-playing and drawing. The elimination of gory monsters and exciting battles in stories is thus likely to generate disappointment in the child who, to suppress the natural urge for the pleasure and satisfaction violence incites, resorts to making up their own instances of such violence. Williams (2004) demonstrates this idea by saying, "There is the story of the boys whose parents scrupulously avoided buying them toy guns only to look out the kitchen window and see the boys pointing sticks at each other while making appropriately explosive sounds" (Williams, 2004, p. 511).

Moreover, they argue that violence should be not only acceptable, but necessary in children's literature because it offers an accurate depiction of the world they live in. Since violence is a fact encountered in nearly every aspect of life, it is argued that to delay kids' exposure to evil is unrealistic and potentially harmful. This is due to the likelihood that they will come to face violent situations in their futures; telling them stories of this nature can therefore provide them with ways to successfully overcome these situations. And these ways need not be violent, they state, because by teaching them about the harmful consequences violence has on both the good and evil characters (the first through suffering and the second through receiving violent punishments) they might develop a preference for peaceful conflict resolutions instead. Thus, if adequately justified in the stories, literary violence can not only be educational but also ethical.

This debate, nevertheless, is ongoing and has extended to include other forms of storytelling, such as film and video games.
