= Thomas Foster =

Thomas or Tom Foster may refer to:

== Politics ==
- Thomas Foster (English politician, died 1589), MP for Much Wenlock
- Thomas Foster (English politician, died 1765) (c. 1720–1765), MP for Dorchester
- Thomas F. Foster (1790–1848), American congressman from the state of Georgia
- Thomas Jefferson Foster (1809–1887), Confederate soldier and politician during the American Civil War
- Thomas Foster (Canadian politician) (1852–1945), Canadian politician and mayor of Toronto
- Thomas Foster (American mayor), physician and mayor of Los Angeles

== Sports ==
- Thomas Foster (Derbyshire cricketer) (1848–1929), Derbyshire cricketer
- Thomas Foster (Australian cricketer) (1883–1974), Australian cricketer
- Thomas Foster (Yorkshire cricketer) (1871–1947), Yorkshire cricketer
- Thomas Foster (Nottingham cricketer), Nottingham cricketer
- Tommy Foster (racing driver), British racing driver

== Other ==
- Thomas Foster (painter) (1798–1826), Irish portrait painter
- Thomas Foster (author) (died 1995), Australian Pentecostal minister and author
- Thomas R. Foster (1835–1889), founder of the Inter-Island Steam Navigation Company
- Thomas C. Foster, American author and professor of English
- Thomas Campbell Foster, English barrister and writer on law, shorthand and Ireland
- Tom Foster (musician), Australian Aboriginal musician
- Tom Foster (comics), fictional comic book character
- Tom Foster, a character in the 1908 film After Many Years

== See also ==
- Thomas Forster (disambiguation)
