= Sonnet 58 =

« » Sonnet 58
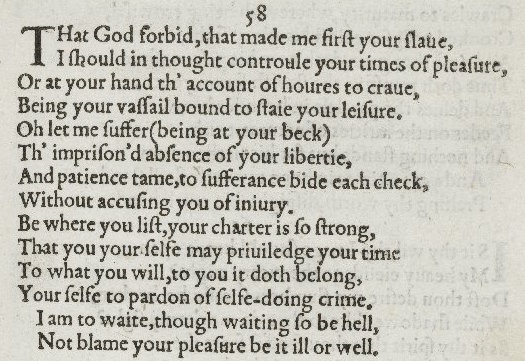
- Sonnet 58 in the 1609 Quarto
Q1
Q2
Q3
C
That god forbid that made me first your slave,
I should in thought control your times of pleasure,
Or at your hand the account of hours to crave,
Being your vassal, bound to stay your leisure!
O, let me suffer, being at your beck,
The imprison’d absence of your liberty;
And patience, tame to sufferance, bide each check,
Without accusing you of injury.
Be where you list, your charter is so strong
That you yourself may privilege your time:
Do what you will; to you it doth belong
Yourself to pardon of self-doing crime.
I am to wait, though waiting so be hell,
Not blame your pleasure, be it ill or well.
—William Shakespeare
4
8
12
14

Shakespeare's Sonnet 58 is a syntactic and thematic continuation of Sonnet 57. More generally, it belongs to the large group of sonnets written to a young, aristocratic man, with whom the poem's speaker shares a tempestuous relationship. In this poem, the speaker complains of the beloved's voluntary absence, using the occasion to outline a more general lament against his own powerlessness and the indifference of the young man.

== Structure ==
Sonnet 58 is an English or Shakespearean sonnet. The Shakespearean sonnet contains three quatrains followed by a final rhyming couplet. It follows the form's typical rhyme scheme, ABAB CDCD EFEF GG, and is written a type of poetic metre called iambic pentameter based on five pairs of metrically weak/strong syllabic positions. The first line exemplifies a regular iambic pentameter; the second adds a final extrametrical syllable or feminine ending:

  ×   /   ×  /     ×   /    ×  /     ×     / 
That God forbid, that made me first your slave,

×   /    ×    /      ×   /   ×    /    ×    / (×) 
I should in thought control your times of pleasure, (58.1-2)

/ = ictus, a metrically strong syllabic position. × = nonictus. (×) = extrametrical syllable.

The meter demands a few variant pronunciations. Lines three and six require the contraction of "the" and the ensuing word: "th'account" (two syllables) and "th'imprisoned" (three syllables). In line three "hours" is one syllable, and in line seven "sufferance" is two.

== Source and analysis ==
Line 6 is obscure. Nicolaus Delius glosses it "Let me bear the fact that the liberty you possess is wanting to me, a captive." While recognizing that Delius might be correct, Edward Dowden suggests "The separation from you, which is proper to your state of freedom, but which to me is imprisonment."

In line 9, the quarto's comma after tame is generally removed; editors have glossed the phrase "tame to sufferance" as "made tame to fortune's blows" (Malone); "bearing tamely even cruel distress" (Dowden); "complaisant in suffering" (Sidney Lee); and "subdued so as to suffer" (Beeching).

In the nineteenth century, there was some debate as to whether this sonnet and Sonnet 57 were addressed to a man or a woman. The tone of querulous anger and the use of some sonnet conventions (such as the conceit of servitude) were sometimes seen as inappropriate for a poem addressed to a social superior and a man. Others, principally those who wished to fit the sonnets into a biographical narrative, accepted that the poems were addressed to a man, and often had a specific man in mind, whether Southampton or someone else. Thomas Tyler, for instance, noted thematic and verbal parallels between these sonnets and some letters of Pembroke. The latter identification has received scant acceptance.

Modern critics accept that the poems were addressed to a young man, and they view the language of class in the sequence from 56 to 59 in terms of a complex dynamic of class difference and desire. The speaker's metaphoric description of love as enslavement is complicated and enriched by the fact that here, the speaker is literally as well as figuratively subordinate to the beloved. For Helen Vendler and Stephen Booth, among others, the rhetoric of enslavement is ironic: it highlights the element of exaggeration in the speaker's rhetoric, thus hinting that those emotions spring more from self-pity than from justified hurt. Other critics agree to the complexity without admitting that it is ironic. David Shallwyck asserts that the sonnet "accomplishes the remarkable feat of simultaneously offering an apology and levelling an accusation."
