= Thomas Forster (disambiguation) =

Thomas Forster (1683–1738) was an English politician and landowner.

Thomas Forster may also refer to:

== Politics ==
- Thomas Forster (Liskeard MP), English member of Parliament for Liskeard, 1399
- Thomas Forster (Lincoln MP) (1406–1415), English member of parliament for Lincoln
- Thomas Forster (Northumberland MP, born 1659) (1659–1725), English member of parliament for Northumberland, 1705–1708, father of Thomas Forster (1683–1738)

== Science and mathematics ==
- Thomas Furly Forster (1761–1825), English botanist
- Thomas Ignatius Maria Forster (1789–1860), English astronomer and naturalist, son of the above
- Thomas Emerson Forster (1802–1875), English mining engineer
- Thomas Forster (mathematician) (born 1948), British set theorist and philosopher

== Others ==
- Thomas Forster (artist) (1676/7–after 1712), English portraitist
- Tom Forster (baseball) (1859–1946), American baseball player
- Tom Forster (coach), American gymnastics coach
- Thomas Forster (dancer) (born 1986), English ballet dancer

== See also ==
- Thomas Foster (disambiguation)
