= Sonnet 57 =

« » Sonnet 57
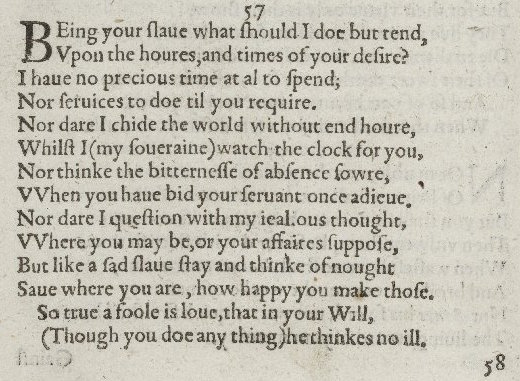
- Sonnet 57 in the 1609 Quarto
Q1
Q2
Q3
C
Being your slave, what should I do but tend
Upon the hours and times of your desire?
I have no precious time at all to spend,
Nor services to do, till you require.
Nor dare I chide the world-without-end hour
Whilst I, my sovereign, watch the clock for you,
Nor think the bitterness of absence sour
When you have bid your servant once adieu;
Nor dare I question with my jealous thought
Where you may be, or your affairs suppose,
But, like a sad slave, stay and think of nought
Save, where you are how happy you make those.
So true a fool is love that in your will,
Though you do any thing, he thinks no ill.
—William Shakespeare
4
8
12
14

Sonnet 57 is one of 154 sonnets written by the English playwright and poet William Shakespeare. It is a member of the Fair Youth sequence, in which the poet expresses his love towards a young man. Sonnet 57 is connected with Sonnet 58 which pursues the theme of the poet as a slave of the beloved.

== Synopsis and analysis ==
The character the poet is writing to, in Sonnet 57, is a young male he seems to be attracted to. "Shakespeare's sonnets display a narrative and a Dramatic Personae which combine to threaten conventional assumptions of appropriate love." Looking at Sonnet 57, the writer is claiming that the young man, due to the age gap, enslaves him and he must be patient and wait for the time when the fair youth desires the poet and the poet will ultimately wait for that time. Furthering this statement into a detailed analysis of the poem, in line one, "being your slave what should I do but tend"; Shakespeare is referring to himself as a slave who serves his master. He continues throughout Sonnet 57 to emphasize that he is devoted to his master.

Shakespeare's Sonnet 57, shows that "his love for the fair youth is seen as pure and even heavenly…" but in other sonnets, he introduces new characters, one in particular the Dark Lady, "his association with the dark lady leads to infection and madness of love". He also uses a terminology about his love and how beautiful it appears, but when this love is being directed to a young man this might appear out of the norm at this time. In the line "Whilst I, my sovereign, watch the clock for you" the word "sovereign" implies that the youth is held at a higher degree, and "watch the clock for you" implies that he will wait for something to happen because of the youth's age or because he is waiting for the youth to recognize his love. The line "nor dare I question with my jealous thought" implies that he has considered that jealousy will raise doubts in his head and might drive his love to madness. That this could end up driving the poet to insanity is suggested in this line, "but, like a sad slave, stay and think of naught." The Speaker is referring to himself as the slave again and is diminishing himself by implying no one would love so low and asking the fair youth to clear his mind of all thoughts of him. Although he is comparing himself to a slave, the poet's love has never once subsided. The last two lines say "so true a fool is love, that in your will, though you do anything, he thinks no ill." The word "will" could be seen as desirable or possibly used as a pun on his name, Will. Since he thinks no ill, he is admitting that his love for the youth has made him a fool: "Ultimately Shakespeare provides space for the homoerotic but must eventually return to the perpetuating systems of heterosexual love". This critique states that Shakespeare's sonnets must be seen as a continuation of love sonnets that play with different ideas of love. Love could imply economic interest or patronage. Another way of viewing the poet's intent could be a sexual or erotic attraction (as the critic Rudd emphasizes) or brotherly or platonic affection.

== Structure ==
Sonnet 57 is an English or Shakespearean sonnet. The English sonnet contains three quatrains followed by a final rhyming couplet. It follows the form's typical rhyme scheme, abab cdcd efef gg and is composed in iambic pentameter, a type of poetic metre based on five pairs of metrically weak/strong syllabic positions. The sixth line exemplifies a regular iambic pentameter:

  ×    /   ×  /   ×      /      ×   /    ×   / 
Whilst I, my sovereign, watch the clock for you, (57.6)

/ = ictus, a metrically strong syllabic position. × = nonictus.

The first line exemplifies an initial reversal and (optionally) a mid-line reversal:

 /×    ×     /     /    ×    ×  /  ×   / 
Being your slave what should I do but tend (57.1)

== Literary interpretation ==
Rhian Williams asserts, "In literary value Shakespeare's sonnets are notably unequal. Many reach levels of lyric melody and meditative energy that are hardly to be matched elsewhere in poetry". His 57th sonnet is such a one and epitomises Shakespeare's signature sonnet structure as it conveys the influences of the 14th-century poet, Petrarch, and showcases again Shakespeare's talent. In fact, Danijela Kambasković-Sawers generalises, "The sonnet sequence genre constructs a double sense of immediacy: drawing on the lyricism of its constituent sonnets, it also often generates a perception of a personal narrative when the sequence is read from beginning to end". She goes on to make a comparison between the two poets and the structures of their subsequent sonnets when he states, "Sonnet sequences like Petrarch's or Shakespeare's make possible a narrative-by-episode". Kambasković-Sawers elaborates on the subject of Shakespeare's controversial yet ambiguous speaker and asserts that while ambiguous speakers were characteristic of both Petrarch's work and a signature of the Elizabethan time period, Shakespeare's differed. "The difference between Shakespeare's and other great Elizabethan sonnet sequences lies in the degree and complexity of his main character's ambiguity, as well as in the skill with which this complexity is managed. Shakespeare's contradictory speaker stands as one of the most important elements of the artistic impact and lasting vitality of the sequence".

In this particular sonnet, the couplet acts as a summary of the basic sentiment of silent and stifled desire that fill the lines of the poem. "So true a fool is love that in your will, though you do anything, he thinks no ill," not only reiterates the dark romanticism that characterizes the entire sonnet, but Shakespeare also subtly establishes a connection between sonnet 57 and the succeeding 58th sonnet. Helen Vendler states, "The slave of [58] reappears, rhyming for his couplet hell and well instead of their cousins will and ill of 57. The hell/well rhyme will return in the couplet of 129, and the will/ill of 57 has already been introduced into the sequence by sonnets 12 and 22. The complex will/ill/hell/well shared by sonnets 57/58 seems to have a life of its own, as its components add to themselves other conceptually related words". Literary editor Stephen Booth analyses the sonnet and claims, "This whole poem may be described as a sustained play on 'to wait' meaning 'to serve', 'to wait on' and 'to wait' meaning 'to tarry in expectation', 'to await'". Booth also remarks upon the rhymes present throughout the sonnet and states, "Note the incidental rhyme-like relationship of the very different functions performed by 'Nor think', 'think of nought' and 'thinks no ill'." He also identifies the fact that Shakespeare, "rhymes 'adieu' with 'you' a dozen times; there is no evidence that he ever gave 'adieu' its French pronunciation". Upon further analysis Booth also cites an undertone of forbidden love (reminiscent of Petrarch's signature poetry) and discusses the many double meanings present throughout the sonnet.

Shakespeare, through his rhyme schemes and diction, not only creates a dark and lustful sonnet that resonates with many of his readers, but also manages to establish a connection between many of his sonnets and create a story with many inferred components.

Literary critics such as David Schalkwyk see this sonnet as playing out a relationship with unequal power. He sees this relationship in Sonnets 26, 57, 58 and notes that it is strongest in 57 saying "This sonnet's hyperbolic reference to slavery invokes more clearly the late-sixteenth-century, almost wholly pejorative sense of vassalage...". With the first lines of the sonnet being, "Being your slave what should I do but tend Upon the hours, and times of your desire?" it clearly correlates back to Schalkwyk's idea that Shakespeare seemingly emphasises a class difference or at the very least a power difference between Shakespeare and the Fair Youth that the sonnet addresses. Schalkwyk goes on to say "This declaration of abject powerlessness (i.e. aforementioned slavery) pushes the notion of vassalage away from that of feudal reciprocity toward a commonplace early modern conception of the servant as utterly, submissive, silent and undemanding". Schalkwyk seems to make the point that during this period servitude was not viewed then as we view it today, but as something quietly accepted, linking to Shakespeare's "servitude" to the Fair Youth as something he is not resentful of, simply accepting the fact that as the speaker his rank in society was less than the addressee and that his position as a "servant" or "slave" to the Fair Youth was nothing more than a simple fact.

Rodney Poisson builds on this idea of an unequal relationship theme that seems to link through many of Shakespeare's sonnets but may be most notably seen in the Fair Youth strand. Poisson thinks that "...one would expect... the lover, who is the older man, would normally be... an established man". Poisson makes the point that though Shakespeare may write the sonnets conscious of a class difference the character at least "lacks the compensation of any acknowledged superiority." We can infer from some of the other sonnets that the Fair Youth is noble, wealthy, and above the speaker in rank. Poisson seems to view any relations toward the Fair Youth as most possibly platonic, brotherly love, rather than other critics suggest that it is more of a homoerotic love on the part of the speaker, and that is why the reference to slavery (being some sort of sexual reference) helplessness, and meekness on part of the speaker despite his advanced age and supposed wisdom.

There is also some debate on whether or not the Fair Youth of the poems was male or female (much debate about Shakespeare is on his sexual orientation). Margareta de Grazia draws the conclusion that, "Pederastic (love of young boys) love is 'much to be preferred' over (heterosexual love)... it does not imperil social distinction". De Grazia's argument here is that despite the fact that Shakespeare acknowledges the social and ranking differences between himself and the Fair Youth, that these differences are irrelevant with regard to his love for the Fair Youth because the speaker and addressee are both presumably male and that the homoerotic love, or the love that may have existed between the speaker and the Fair Youth was not difficult to seek out due to the social and ranking differences. De Grazia's view is extremely different from the aforementioned Poisson's view in the specific point that Poisson views the relationship between the speaker and the Fair Youth as a brotherly love sort of affection, whereas De Grazia clearly views it as a relationship on the homoerotic level.

== Interpretations ==
- Janet McTeer, for the 2002 compilation album, When Love Speaks (EMI Classics)
