= A Coin =

1997 short story by Aleksandar Hemon

"A Coin" is a 1997 short story by Bosnian-American author Aleksandar Hemon, published both as a single story in the Winter 1997 issue of Chicago Review and alongside several other short stories in The Question of Bruno, published in 2000.

The story follows Aida, a resident of Sarajevo throughout the Bosnian War, as she sends letters to a narrator placed in Chicago, detailing her experiences as someone deeply involved to a Bosnian who is at a disconnect from the area having left it some time before the conflict had worsened.

== Plot ==
As the Bosnian War rages on, a young woman called Aida sends letters describing her experiences throughout the conflict as she, as a video editor for foreign news outlets, maintains an in-depth view of the events. Her letters have become more scarce, causing the narrator to fear that she has died.

Her letters begin with a description of running between two points, through an area covered by a sniper, followed by a description of Sarajevo's war-torn landscape. The narrator then interjects, speaking on the scarcity of Aida's letters and his suspicions regarding her death, as such information would reach him on a considerable delay.

Once the narrator's interjection passes, the focus returns to Aida, who mentions her aunt Fatima's death due to a medicine shortage as the asthma medication she depended on could not reach her, leading to her suffocation. Due to the risk of being shot or injured, Aida put off burying her until later.

Aida's letter then begins to cover Kevin, a cameraman from Chicago, the same area the narrator now lives in. Kevin regularly covers territories in a state of war. His more grounded stories cause Aida to enjoy his company and eventually become closer to him, as the events he films line up with her own occupation and needs. Kevin echoes her sentiment that the goriest, more compelling events filmed will never be broadcast, as she had experienced a similar sort of censorship when editing footage for foreign networks. This blockage led to her storing the worst of the events filmed on a tape that only she has access to.

Aida describes a dream where she watches a woman performing a pantomime of her, though she believes that it is not quite accurate, due to the language spoken by said woman.

The narrator then interjects, drawing parallels between Aida's descriptions of war and loneliness and his own cockroach-ridden Chicago apartment. He believes the cockroaches to be a part of his hallucinations caused by his own loneliness, though he is not entirely sure of it. He expresses some connection to Sarajevo, but does not recognize buildings shown to him by a friend. He is displeased with the letters he writes to her, wishing to speak more of himself rather than what he considers to be vapid anecdotes from his new life in the United States. He describes himself as having some trouble with English, as well. He believes words to be limited in their ability to express.

Aida's letters resume, as she speaks of growing closer to Kevin due to his detachment from the environments he filmed in, and the relatability of his stories to her own experiences. She mentions a lack of electricity due to the conflict. She describes the relations as carnal and joyless, however. In addition to this, Aida mentions having put her aunt in a new room prior to her burial. Her corpse would remain there for a week.

The narrator once again mentions his ongoing mania through a hallucination of cockroaches ascending his legs, leading to him requesting help from his janitor.

Aida continues, voicing her now flipped sentiments toward Kevin for the same detachment she began to love him as a result of. This stemmed from his refusal to help a gravely injured woman who he had filmed having her arms detached as she had been gesturing for help. Aida decides to add this scene to her secret tape. She then describes the television studio she sleeps in, a large, dark room filled with cameras that act as tripping hazards, where electricity is produced by a gasoline-powered generator.

The narrator speaks of the Red Cross routes through which he would commonly send letters to Aida, though the letters take a long time to arrive as a result. He feels that due to this, by the time she has received the letter sent, he has changed enough to render to sentiments he depicted the months prior null. He changes often, leading to his sentiment that all that he writes becomes a lie. This is why he pursues such shallow, past topics for his letters, admitting to the fact that it acts as a mechanism of cowardice to make him feel like his and Aida's lives occur in tandem.

Aida's aunt began to produce a stench so pungent and inescapable that once perfumes stopped masking it, they dumped her out of a window during a time between shelling sessions. Aida still indulges in common experiences with Kevin.

Upon seeing images of destroyed buildings in Sarajevo shown to him by a friend who asked him if he could identify the architecture, the narrator begins to see them as empty, being unable to recognize any.

Aida outlines the experience of sprinting through a sniper-covered zone, then mentioning the picture she sent the narrator depicting herself in front of a library in a bulletproof vest. the purchase of said vest became one of her happiest recent memories, as it would make it harder for snipers to kill her; they would need to hit a clean shot to her head, as her body would be protected. For a similar reason, Aida would cut her hair short.

The narrator has stopped receiving letters from Aida, admitting that he has begun to write them himself. He wants idea to be alive, assuring himself that he will one day approach his mailbox to see it full with her letters and that she is writing them as he writes his own material.

Aida produces a comparison between rape and a sniper bullet, believing that death via a shot to the head invites instant death, while rape violates the body and produces a slow, grotesque death. She would rather be raped after she is fully dead, as she would like to maintain her body until she dies. She has begun taking different routes to visit her parents as a sniper has begun to recognize her paths and expects her.

The narrator relays watching cockroaches scurry about his residence until he can no longer reach them beneath his futon. He wonders about the engine that keeps them moving, likening such a drive to Aida's sprints through sniper territory.

Aida explains the sport murder of dogs by the snipers, an action performed out of boredom. She takes Kevin on a tour, afraid that the same boredom affecting the sniper may finds its way to him, leading to his departure. Both herself and Kevin are disconcerted by the silences between bombing rounds. She tells Kevin that she is pregnant.

The narrator feels trapped and fears that the spiders lining his room may inject him with their poison.

Aida witnesses stray dogs tearing her aunt's corpse apart. Her hair is now gray, as she asks the narrator to write to her further.

The narrator bisects a cockroach with a knife, watching its halves flail.

Aida's childbirth fails, as she attempts to contact Kevin to no avail.

The narrator's Polaroid camera documents his residence, though he had bought it for such a purpose; to view his objects without his own influence.

Aida once again describes the rush of running through a sniper zone – a rush that fades as quickly as it arose, upon crossing the dangerous area. She states that amongst the viscera of failed traversers one may find blood and limbs and in one's own pockets a "worthless" coin.

== Style ==
Hemon has said that the fragmented nature of his writing, which is present in "A Coin", was not inherently due to the fracturing of Yugoslavia underneath the pressure of a war. Rather, it was produced intentionally, in order to create an effective timeline within his writings. He himself believed that fragments were portions of an appropriate organization of time, as it were.

== Critical analysis ==
In her 2021 analysis of the story, Una Tanović argued that, from a standpoint regarding dialogue, "A Coin"'s nature as a collection of letters undermines ease of access and understanding, rather serving to exhibit the difficulties of communication between those forced to leave a country and those who remain within it. Here, she stated that the story acts against convention by producing a lack of dialogue through an epistolary structure, highlighting difficulties of conversation under strained circumstances. She wrote:

I argue that by undermining the dialogic writing that is a basic generic epistolary convention, [...] Hemon highlight[s] the impassibility of some national borders to some bodies. Instead of privileging the ideals of dialogue, communication, and human connection, the letters in these stories subvert them, thus cautioning against ignoring asymmetries of power in situations of forced migration and not allowing for a simplistic celebration of mobility in an age of supposedly unparalleled border-crossings.

Joseph Haske's analysis tackled the story from a perspective of violence, stating that "A Coin" produces a narrative of authenticity in the way violence is depicted through a more prosaic style of writing and through the breadth of distance between the narrator himself and Aida. A similar viewpoint is presented by Riccardo Nicolosi, in that Hemon's presentation of a gritty reality only pushes towards a more uncanny "unreality" built by the heavy emphasis on wartime imagery and brutal description, wherein what should ease understanding only makes clarity more difficult to pursue.

José Ibáñez, from another perspective, claimed the story produces a critique of modern American literature by awakening the voice of a "submerged population", acting as a vocal source for the subaltern. Said argument was supplemented by the idea that the story had not been taken seriously due to a stigma concerning short stories, at the time, hinting that stories concerning the subaltern suffered within the literature sphere, as critiqued by Hemon, here.
