= Thomas C. Foster =

American author and English professor

- Born: United States
- Occupations: Professor, author
- Writing career
- Genres: Literary criticism, educational nonfiction
- Notable work: How to Read Literature Like a Professor (2003)

Thomas C. Foster is an American author and professor of English, best known for his book How to Read Literature Like a Professor: A Lively and Entertaining Guide to Reading Between the Lines (2003), which became a widely used introduction to literary analysis in high school and college classrooms.

== Career ==
Foster has taught English literature and writing at the University of Michigan–Flint, where he specialized in contemporary fiction, poetry, drama, and composition. Over the course of his academic career, he transitioned from traditional scholarly writing to more accessible “trade” nonfiction aimed at general readers and students.

He has written several academic works in addition to his popular literature guides, including studies on modern literature and specific authors.

== Works ==
- Form and Society in Modern Literature (1988)
- Seamus Heaney (1989)
- Understanding John Fowles (1994)
- How to Read Literature Like a Professor (2003)
- How to Read Novels Like a Professor (2008)
- Reading the Silver Screen (film analysis work)

== Style and influence ==
Foster is known for his pedagogical approach to literary criticism, emphasizing recurring patterns, symbols, and narrative conventions. His writing is intended to make literary analysis accessible to non-specialist audiences, particularly students.

== Reception ==
How to Read Literature Like a Professor has been widely adopted in educational settings and has sold over one million copies. It is frequently cited as an introductory text in literary studies courses.
