= How to Read Literature Like a Professor =

2003 book by Thomas C. Foster

How to Read Literature like a Professor
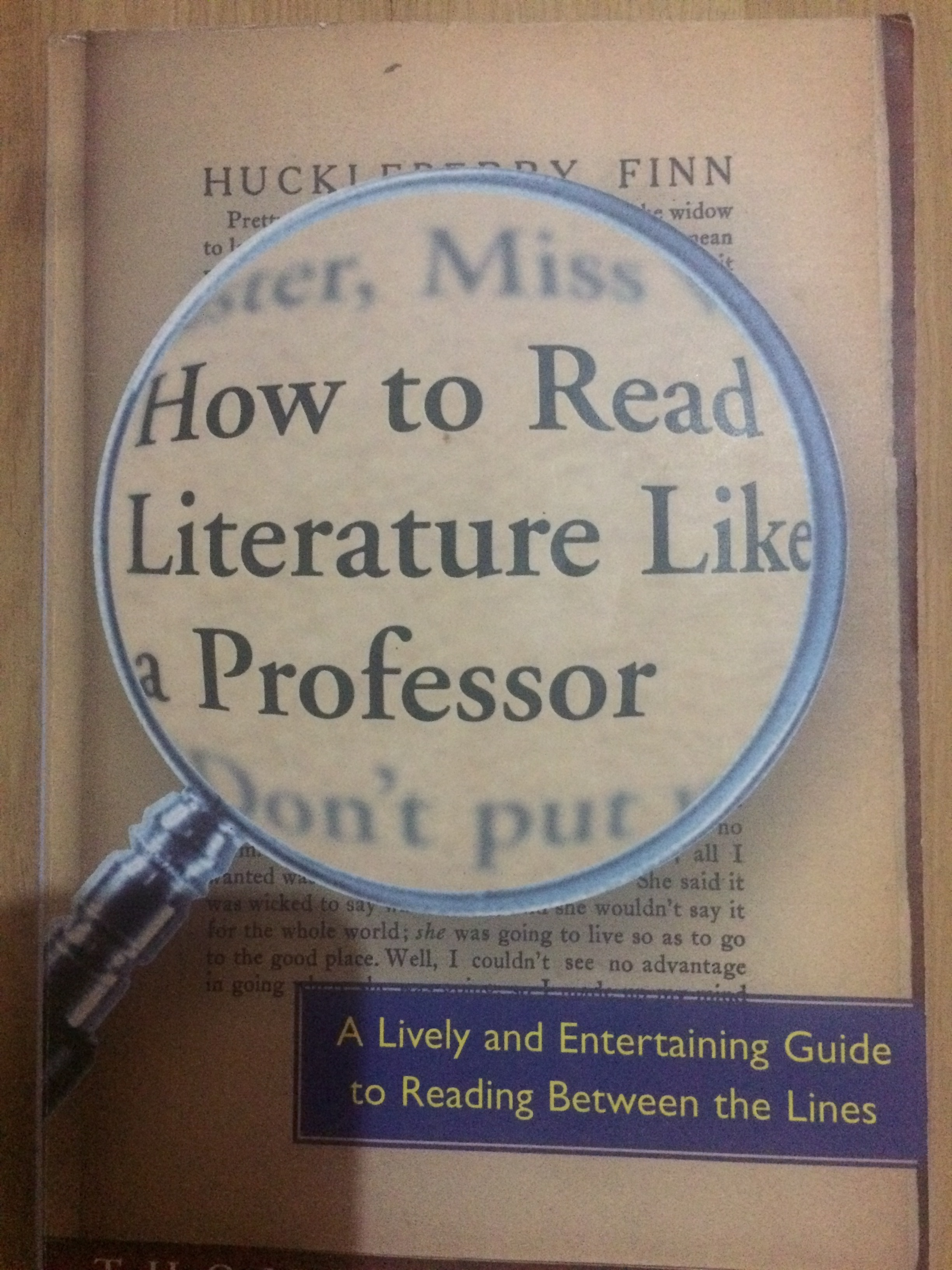
- Author: Thomas C. Foster
- Language: English
- Genre: Literary Criticism
- Publisher: Harper
- Publication date: 2003
- Media type: Print
- Pages: 314 pp (first edition, paperback)
- ISBN: 0-06-000942-X (first edition, paperback)
- OCLC: 50511079

How to Read Literature Like a Professor is a New York Times bestseller by Thomas C. Foster that was published in 2003. The author suggests interpretations of themes, concepts, and symbols commonly found in literature. The book brands itself as "A Lively and Entertaining Guide to Reading Between the Lines," and is commonly used throughout advanced English courses in the United States.

The book also includes sample interpretations of Katherine Mansfield's short story, "The Garden Party".

The author's simple, methodical take on literary interpretation has fallen under the scrutiny of literary experts, such as the English professor and biographer Alan Jacobs, who question the value of the book's premise and criticize the idea that "reading is best done by highly trained, professionally accredited experts."

== See also ==
- How to Read a Book
- Reading (process)
