= Herbert Deinert =

German-American cultural and literary scholar (1930–2010)

- Born: December 13, 1930; Wiedenbrück, Germany
- Died: August 4, 2010 (aged 80); Ithaca, New York, US
- Spouse: Waltraut Deinert
- Children: 2

Academic background
- Education: University of Münster; Saint Bonaventure University (BA); Yale University (PhD)
- Thesis: Rilke und die Musik

Academic work
- Era: 16th century to the present
- Region: German literature
- School or tradition: Close reading; Text-immanent literary interpretation; Geistesgeschichte
- Institutions: University of Georgia; Duke University; Cornell University
- Main interests: history of literature; cultural studies; theology; German idealism

External image
- Herbert Deinert

Herbert Deinert (December 13, 1930 – August 4, 2010) was a professor of German literature at Cornell University from 1965 to 2004. His research and scholarly publications dealt with German literature and cultural history from the Middle Ages to the present, and he also authored satirical essays and parables for the Cornell Daily Sun and the Ithaca Journal.

Deinert attended elementary school at the Franciscan monastery in his birthplace Wiedenbrück prior to advancing to the Evanglisch Stiftisches Gymnasium in nearby Gütersloh. He held a leadership position in the Catholic youth organization and considered entering the priesthood. After beginning studies at the University of Münster, he received a scholarship to enroll at the Franciscan St. Bonaventure University in Olean, New York. He pursued graduate study of German literature at Yale University. Here he met Waltraut von der Emde, his future wife, who later taught at Wells College as a professor of German. He completed his Ph.D. in 1959 with a dissertation on Rilke and music.

Deinert taught at the University of Georgia (1959–1961) and Duke University (1961–1965) prior to being called to Cornell University in 1965. Here he chaired the Department of German Literature from 1968 to 1974 and also was director of undergraduate (1974–1989) and graduate (1980–1985) studies in German literature. He served as president of the Central New York Chapter of the American Association of Teachers of German. He administered the Berlin branch of Classrooms Abroad, and for many years before and after his retirement in 2004 he coordinated Cornell's exchange programs with German universities through the German Academic Exchange Service.

Deinert's research and teaching centered on the works of Goethe (especially Faust), Schiller, Kleist, Tieck, Hauptmann, Hesse, Rilke, Kafka, Mann, and Brecht. He had a lifelong interest in the history of Christianity, with a special focus on Catholic mysticism and the Catholic resistance to Nazi Germany by such theologians as Romano Guardini. He pointed to the role of the Church in the fall of the Berlin Wall. Deinert wrote:

...Luther abhorred the very idea of a revolution and wanted no part of it; he understood his mission as solely religious and fundamentalist-reformist. In 20th century East Germany, by contrast, what began as a reform movement eventually became a political revolution supported by the Protestant Church.... Ignoring a long tradition of church sponsored civil obedience the East German citizens did not "go home quietly to mind their own business" once their petitions were denied. Show them how many you are, pleads the radical priest Roux in Peter Weiss' Marat/Sade. They showed them. They came back, ever more numerous, non-violent, and they succeeded stunningly. And, improbably, the German Protestant Church had been part of the solution, had finally (if ever so slowly and reluctantly, like wading through molasses, pestered and pushed by an impatient people) adopted a political voice. The Church resolved at last to identify with and participate in the struggle against intolerable conditions, and to oppose the rulers responsible for them. That, too, was a "Protestant Revolution".... After the failed uprising of 1953 the East German regime declared that it had lost faith in the people, and that the people must work hard to restore it. Luther would have applauded this breathtaking display of mandarin arrogance and political analphabetism. Brecht asked slyly at the time: "Why doesn't the government dismiss the people and elect another?" Some thirty-five years later Luther's paralyzing rules of conduct were quietly modified. Even Edmund Burke would have approved: "...a revolution will always be the very last resource of the thinking and the good." It was the last resort. The revolution of 1989 coincided with and overshadowed the 200th anniversary of the French Revolution. But the strategies employed now, lest things get out of hand, were those of Mahatma Gandhi and the other Martin Luther, Martin Luther King. 

== Selected works ==
- Rilke und die Musik. Yale University dissertation, 1959. <https://courses.cit.cornell.edu/hd11/Rilke-und-die-Musik.pdf>
- "Der Ackermann aus Böhmen," Journal of English and Germanic Philology 61:2 (April 1962): 205–216. <https://www.jstor.org/stable/27714004>
- "Franz Kafka – Ein Hungerkünstler." Wirkendes Wort 13:2 (April 1963): 78–87. <https://courses.cit.cornell.edu/hd11/Hungerkuenstler.html>
- "Die Entfaltung des Bösen in Böhmes Mysterium Magnum," PMLA 79:4 (September 1964): 401–410. <https://doi.org/10.2307/460745>
- "Kafka's Parable 'Before the Law'," The Germanic Review, 39:3 (1964): 192–200. <https://doi.org/10.1080/19306962.1964.11787181>
- "The Protestant Revolution, or: Wider die falsche Gelassenheit." Dimensions. A. Leslie Willson & Contemporary German Arts and Letters, ed. Peter Pabisch and Ingo R. Stoehr (Krefeld: van Acken, 1993). <https://courses.cit.cornell.edu/hd11/ProtestantRevol.html>
- "Germans Against Hitler." The Ithaca Journal, 26 August 1994. <https://publikationen.ub.uni-frankfurt.de/opus4/frontdoor/deliver/index/docId/13842/file/http_courses.cit.cornell.edu_hd11_GermansAgainstHitler.pdf>
- (Co-author): "Colonialism and the Postcolonial Condition" [on Faust as colonizer], PMLA 110:5 (October 1995): 1047–1052. <https://doi.org/10.2307/463029>
