= André von Gronicka =

German literary scholar (1912–1999)

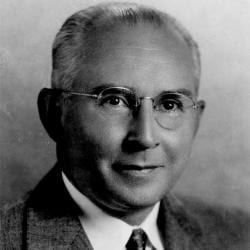
- Born: 25 May 1912; Moscow, Russia
- Died: 23 November 1999 (aged 87); Manahawkin, NJ.
- Citizenship: American

Academic background
- Education: University of Rochester (BA, MA); Columbia University (PhD)
- Doctoral advisor: Robert Herndon Fife, Jr.

Academic work
- Discipline: Germanic studies; Slavic studies; Comparative literature
- Institutions: University of Chicago; Columbia University; University of Pennsylvania
- Main interests: Interconnections of Russian and German literature; Modern German literature

André von Gronicka (25 May 1912 – 23 November 1999) was a Russian-born American literary scholar who taught German at Columbia University (1942–1962) and was Professor and Chair of the German department at the University of Pennsylvania (1962–1980). Gronicka's research focused on modern German literature and the interconnections between Russian and German literature.

== Life and career ==
André von Gronicka was born in Moscow, Russia, on 25 May 1912. He fled to Germany in 1918 after the Russian Revolution and moved to the United States in 1926, becoming an American citizen in 1933. Gronicka attended a Gymnasium in Icking near Munich before going to East High School in Rochester, New York.

Gronicka received an A.B. and MA from the University of Rochester, New York, in 1933 and 1935, respectively, where he was a member of German National Honor Society. These studies were followed by a PhD at Columbia University on Henry von Heiseler under the direction of Robert Herndon Fife, Jr. From 1942 to 1944, Gronicka taught specialized Russian courses during World War 2 in the army.

Gronicka taught at the University of Kansas and the University of Chicago before becoming an assistant Professor of German and Russian at Columbia University (1944–1949), Associate Professor of German Languages (1959–1959), and full Professor of German (1959–1962). At Columbia, Gronicka was the curator of the German House (1961–1962) and a program director to teach Russian to the Airforce officers.

Gronicka moved to the University of Pennsylvania in 1962 and remained a full Professor until his retirement in 1980. At Penn, he was chairman of the German department from 1962 to 1972 and was acting chairman from 1978 to 1979. He founded the Max Kade German Center and co-founded the first Modern College Language House at the University of Pennsylvania.

Gronicka was a visiting professor at Mount Holyoke College, Dartmouth College, City College of New York, Amherst College, Harvard University, Indiana University and the University of Kansas. He was also a guest lecturer at various German societies in America (Philadelphia, Washington D.C., New York, and Chicago).

Gronicka was a member of the Modern Language Association of America (MLA), the American Association of Teachers of German (AATG), the American Association of Teachers of Slavic and East European Languages (AATSEEL), the National Societies of Literature and Arts and the Thomas Mann Society in Zürich.

Gronicka was the editor of The Germanic Review from 1947 to 1977 and on the editorial board of The Germanic Review (1954–1958). He was also on the Editorial Advisor Committee of the Germano-Slavica and the Advisory Committee of Odyssey. A Journal of Modern Latin American and European literature in English Translation.

Gronicka was a Fulbright fellow and Social Science Research Fellow (1957/1958), twice a Guggenheim fellow (1957, 1965), and a Senior Research Fellow at the National Endowment for the Humanities (1976/1977). In 1971, Gronicka received an honorary M.A. from the University of Pennsylvania and was an honorary member of the Modern Language Association of America (MLA).

Gronicka married Hild Stock in 1936 and had two daughters, Andrea Rudner and Ingrid O'Riordan. He died of cancer on 23 November 1999.

== Bibliography ==
=== Authored works ===
- Von Gronicka, André. 1944. "Henry Von Heiseler : A Russo-German Writer." Dissertation King's Crown Press. Columbia University.
- Von Gronicka, André and Helen Yakobson. 1958. Essentials of Russian : Reading Conversation Grammar. 3rd ed. Englewood Cliffs N.J: Prentice-Hall.
- Von Gronicka, André. 1968. The Russian Image of Goethe. Volume 1 Goethe in Russian Literature of the First Half of the Nineteenth Century. Philadelphia Pa: University of Pennsylvania Press.
- Von Gronicka, Andrè. 1985 The Russian Image of Goethe. Volume 2 Goethe in Russian Literature of the Second Half of the Nineteenth Century. Philadelphia Pa: University of Pennsylvania Press.
- Von Gronicka André. 1970. Thomas Mann: Profile and Perspectives with Two Unpublished Letters and a Chronological List of Important Events [1St ed.] ed. New York: Random House.

=== Articles (selection) ===
- "Thomas Mann and Russia." The Germanic Review: Literature, Culture, Theory 20, no. 2 (1945): 105–137.
- "Ein “symbolisches Formelwort” in Thomas Manns Zauberberg." The Germanic Review: Literature, Culture, Theory 23, no. 2 (1948): 125–130.
- "Thomas Mann’s Doktor Faustus: Prolegomena to an Interpretation." The Germanic Review: Literature, Culture, Theory 23, no. 3 (1948): 206–218.
- "Friedrich Schiller’s Marquis Posa: A Character Study." The Germanic Review: Literature, Culture, Theory 26, no. 3 (1951): 196–214.
- "Das Motiv der Einsamkeit im modernen deutschen Drama." The German Quarterly 27, no. 1 (1954): 12–24.
- "Charles E. Passage, Dostoevski the Adapter. A Study in Dostoevski's Use of the Tales of Hoffmann. University of North Carolina Studies in Comparative Literature, No. 10. Chapel Hill: The University of North Carolina Press, 1954. 205 pp. Cloth 3.50." American Slavic and East European Review 14, no. 4 (1955): 568–570.
- "Rilke and the Pasternaks: A Biographical Note." The Germanic Review: Literature, Culture, Theory 27, no. 4 (1952): 260–271.
- "Goethe and His Russian Translator-Interpreter VA Zhukovski (1783–1852)." PMLA 70, no. 1 (1955): 145–165.
- "“Myth plus Psychology”: a Style Analysis of Death in Venice." The Germanic Review: Literature, Culture, Theory 31, no. 3 (1956): 191–205.
- "Alexander Pushkin's View of Goethe." Comparative Literature 12, no. 3 (1960): 243–255.
- "Early Russian Reaction to Goethe and His Work." The Germanic Review: Literature, Culture, Theory 38, no. 2 (1963): 137–150.
- "The Russian Poet-Critic, SP Shevyrëv, on Goethe." Comparative Literature (1966): 145–161.
- "Goethe and the Russian Radical, NG Chernyshevski." The Germanic Review: Literature, Culture, Theory 49, no. 1 (1974): 29–43.
