= Fatima Naqvi =

American literary and film scholar

Fatima Naqvi is a literary and film scholar whose research focuses on modern Austrian film, ecological films, affect studies, and the interconnections of film, literature, and architecture. She is currently the Elias W. Leavenworth Professor of Germanic Languages and Literatures and Film and Media Studies at Yale University. Her works include How We Learn where We Live: Thomas Bernhard, Architecture, and Bildung and The Literary and Cultural Rhetoric of Victimhood: Western Europe, 1970-2005.

== Career ==
Fatima Naqvi completed her B.A. from Dartmouth College in 1993 before receiving her Ph.D. from Harvard University in 2000. Naqvi was a professor at Rutgers University from 2000 to 2019. She joined the faculty of the German department at Yale University in 2019 and became Leavenworth Professor of Germanic Languages and Literatures and Professor of Film and Media Studies two years later.

Naqvi has been on the board of the ICI Berlin and Botstiber Institute for Austro-American Studies, on the editorial board of The Germanic Review, German Quarterly, and Wiener Digitale Revue, and on the review committees of the Austrian Academy of Sciences and the German Research Foundation. She has also been an editor of Volltext: Zeitschrift für Literatur, Investigations and Recherche – Zeitung für Wissenschaft.

Naqvi has been a guest professor at Harvard University (2017) and was a Fulbright Professor at the Center for Intermediality Studies at Karl-Franzens-Universität Graz (2013).

== Bibliography ==
=== Books ===
- The Literary and Cultural Rhetoric of Victimhood: Western Europe 1970–2005 Palgrave Macmillan, New York, NY, 2007.
- Trügerische Vertrautheit: Filme von Michael Haneke/ Deceptive Familiarity: Films by Michael Haneke, Synema, Wien, 2010.
- How We Learn Where We Live: Thomas Bernhard, Architecture, and Bildung Northwestern University Press, Evanston, Illinois, 2015.
- The White Ribbon, Boydell & Brewer, Suffolk, 2020.
- (with Roy Grundmann and Colin Root) Michael Haneke: Interviews, University Press of Mississippi, Jackson, 2020.
- The Insulted Landscape: Postwar German Culture 1960–1995 Königshausen & Neumann, Würzburg, 2021.

=== Articles (selection) ===
- "Dialectic at a Standstill: The Discourse of Victimhood in Thomas Bernhard’s ‘Heldenplatz.’" The German Quarterly, vol. 75, no. 4, 2002, pp. 408–21.
- "The Abandoned Victim: Cosmology and History in Christoph Ransmayr and Anselm Kiefer". German Life and Letters, 2004; 57: 219–235.
- “After Life: Reflections on Elfriede Jelinek’s Work since 1995.” Modern Austrian Literature, vol. 39, no. 3/4, 2006, pp. 3–13.
- "A Melancholy Labor of Love, or Film Adaptation as Translation: Michael Haneke's Drei Wege zum See', The Germanic Review: Literature, Culture, Theory, 2010; 81:4, 291–315.
- "Unmögliche Möglichkeiten: Elfriede Jelineks paradoxe Topologie in „Angst. Störung.”" 2010. In Lob der Oberfläche. Leiden, The Netherlands: Brill
- "Ephemeral Spaces and Pneumatic Architecture: The Films of Nikolaus Geyrhalter". New German Critique 1 November 2019; 46 (3 (138)): 125–155.
- "Zum Fremdschämen. Ulrich Seidls Filmgrammatik" in Erk, Corina, and Brad Prager. Ulrich Seidl. 2020.
- "Kakanian Flyspecks: Film Criticism in Austria since the 1990s." New German Critique 1 November 2020; 47 (3 (141)): 21–31.
