= David E. Wellbery =

David E. Wellbery (born January 17, 1947) is an American professor of German Studies at the University of Chicago. As of 2022 he is the chair of the department of Germanic Studies and holds the LeRoy T. and Margaret Deffenbaugh Carlson University Professorship in the department. In 2020 he was elected to the American Philosophical Society.

== Education ==
He received a B.A. in 1969 from Binghamton University. He studied for a year at the Johannes Gutenberg Universität in Mainz, then received a Ph.D. from Yale University in 1977.

== Career ==
Wellbery began his academic career at Stanford University, where he taught between 1975 and 1990. Between 1990 and 2001, he taught at the Johns Hopkins University as the William Kurrelmeyer Professor of German. Since 2001, he has been on the faculty at the University of Chicago as Leroy T. and Margaret Deffenbaugh Carlson University Professor. He holds appointments in Germanic Studies and Comparative Literature and serves on the Committee on Social Thought. He is the Director of the Center for Interdisciplinary Research on German Literature and Culture.

== Recognition ==
In 2009, he received an honorary doctorate: Doctor Philosophiae Honoris Causa, Universität Konstanz. He has also been a guest or visiting professor at the Rheinische Friedrich-Wilhelms-Universität Bonn, Princeton University, Universidade do Estado do Rio de Janeiro, and the University of Copenhagen. In 2001, he was a faculty member of the Cornell University School for Criticism and Theory.

== Fellowships and awards ==
- Clark Foundation Scholarship (1965–69)
- New York State Regents Scholarship (1965–69)
- Woodrow Wilson Fellowship (1969, declined)
- Fulbright Fellowship (1969–70)
- Danforth Fellowship (1972–75)
- Mary Cady Tew Prize for Excellence in Graduate Study (1974)
- Mellon Junior Faculty Support Grant (1980)
- Fellow, Stanford Humanities Center (1982–83)
- Dean's Award for Excellence in Teaching, Stanford University (1983)
- ACLS Travel Grant (1984)
- NEH Summer Research Grant (1987)
- Fellow, Wissenschaftskolleg zu Berlin (1989–90)
- Guest Scholar, Forschungsschwerpunkt Literaturwissenschaft, Berlin (Summer, 1994, 1995, 1996)
- Fellow, Carl Friedrich von Siemens Stiftung, Munich, 2002–03
- Forschungspreis (Research Prize) der Alexander von Humboldt-Stiftung, Berlin (2005)
- Corresponding Fellow of Bayerische Akademie der Wissenschaften (2008)
- Honorary Ph.D. of University Konstanz (2009)
- In 2010 he became a member of the German Academy of Sciences Leopoldina.
- Jacob- und-Wilhelm-Grimm-Preis of Deutscher Akademischer Austauschdienst (2010)

== Books ==
- Lessing’s Laocoön. Semiotics and Aesthetics in the Age of Reason, (ISBN 0-521-25794-8) 1984; paperback: 2009
- Johann Wolfgang von Goethe, Harzreise im Winter: Eine Deutungskontroverse, co-authored with Klaus Weimar (ISBN 3-506-75054-2) 1984
- The Specular Moment: Goethe’s Early Lyric and the Beginnings of Romanticism, (ISBN 0-8047-2694-9) 1996
- Neo-retórica e desconstrução (ISBN 85-85881-52-6) 1998
- Schopenhauers Bedeutung für die moderne Literatur (publication of the Siemens Stiftung) 1998
- Seiltänzer des Paradoxalen (ISBN 3-446-20800-3) 2006

== Editions and collections ==
- Positionen der Literaturwissenschaft, (ISBN 3-406-37731-9) 1st ed. 1985, 2nd ed. 1987, 3rd ed. 1994, 4th ed. 2002 - an introduction to literary theory for students of German literature
- Reconstructing Individualism: Autonomy, Individuality, and the Self in Western Thought, co-edited with Thomas C. Heller, Morton Sosna, Arnold I. Davidson, Ann Swidler, and Ian Watt (ISBN 0-8047-1291-3) 1986
- Interpretation -- Discourse -- Society, co-edited with Russell Berman (special issue of Stanford Literature Review) 1986
- Goethe, The Sorrows of Young Werther, Elective Affinities, Novella, = Volume 11 of Goethe. The Collected Works (ISBN 0-691-04346-9) 1989
- The Ends of Rhetoric: History, Theory, Practice, co-edited with John Bender (ISBN 0-8047-1818-0) 1990
- Chronotypes: The Construction of Time, co-edited with John Bender (ISBN 0-8047-1912-8) 1991
- Traditions of Experiment from the Enlightenment to the Present: Essays in Honor of Peter Demetz, co-edited with Nancy Kaiser (ISBN 0-472-10309-1) 1992
- Observation/Form/Difference: Literary Studies and Second-Order Cybernetics (special issue of MLN) 1996
- Die Bedeutung des Sehens im Werk Goethes, co-edited with Dorothea von Muecke (special issue of Deutsche Vierteljahrsschrift für Literaturwissenschaft und Geistesgeschichte) 2001
- Kunst - Zeugung - Geburt, co-edited with Christian Begemann (ISBN 3-7930-9274-7) 2002
- New History of German Literature, editor-in-chief (ISBN 0-674-01503-7) 2005
- Eine neue Geschichte der deutschen Literatur, editor-in-chief (ISBN 978-3-940432-12-4) 2007

== Editorial work ==
- Co-editor of the Deutsche Vierteljahrsschrift für Literaturwissenschaft und Geistesgeschichte, the most distinguished journal in the field of German literary studies, 1998–present
- Co-editor with Werner Hamacher of the Stanford University Press series Meridian: Crossing Aesthetics 1993–2000 (43 vols.)
- Editor of Stanford Literature Review 1983–1986
- Editorial Board, Germanic Review 1984–present
- Editorial Board, Goethe Yearbook 1987–present
- Editorial Board, Weimarer Beitraege 1995–present
- Editorial Board, Comparative Literature 1996–present
- Advisory Board, Publications of the English Goethe Society 2003–present

== Articles and essays ==
- "Narrative Theory and Textual Interpretation: Hofmannsthal's Sommerreiseas Test Case, Deutsche Vierteljahrsschrift für Literaturwissenschaft Undgeistesgeschichte (1980), 306–33.
- "E.T.A. Hoffmann and Romantic Hermeneutics: An Interpretation of Hoffmann's Don Juan, Studies in Romanticism, (1980), 455–73.
- "The Specular Moment: Construction of Meaning in a Poem by Goethe," Goetheyearbook (1982), 1–41.
- "Zur Poetik der Figuration bei Rilke: 'Die Gazelle'," in: Zu Rainer Maria Rilke, ed. Egon Schwarz (Stuttgart, 1982), 125–33.
- "Semiotische Anmerkungen zu Kleists Erdbeben in Chili," in: Positionen der Literaturwissenschaft (II.1), 69–87.
- "Die Grenzen des Idyllischen bei Goethe," in: Unser Commercium: Goethes Undschillers Literaturpolitik, ed. Wilfried Barner, Eberhard Lämmert, Norbert Oellers, Veröffentlichungen der deutschen Schillergesellschaft, vol. 42, (Stuttgart, 1984), 221–40.
- "Die Wahlverwandtschaften," in: Goethes Episches Werk, ed. Paul Michael Lützeler, (Stuttgart, 1985), 291–318.
- "Introduction," (with Thomas Heller), in: Reconstructing Individualism (II.2), 1–15.
- "Mukarovsky und Kant: Zum Status ästhetischer Zeichen," in: Zeichen und Funktion. Beiträge zur Ästhetischen Konzeption Jan Mukarovskys, ed. Hans Günther, (Munich, 1986), 148–79.
- "Postmodernism in Europe: On Recent German Writing," in: Postmodernism: An International Survey, ed. Alan Trachtenburg, (Baton Rouge, 1985), 229–250.
- "Death as a Poetological Problem in Texts by Erich Fried and Ernst Meister," in: Argumentium e Silentio: An International Paul Celan Symposium, ed. Amy Colin, (Berlin and New York, 1987), 87–98.
- "Benjamin's Theory of the Lyric," Studies in Twentieth-Century Literature (1986), 24–45. Reprinted in: Benjamin's Ground. New Readings of Walter Benjamin, ed. Rainer Nägele, (Detroit, 1989), 39–59.
- "Theory of Events: Foucault and Literary Criticism", Revue Internationale Dephilosophie (1987), 420–432.
- "Rhetorik und Literatur. Anmerkungen zur poetologischen Begriffsbildung bei Friedrich Schlegel," in: Die Aktualität der Frühromantik, ed. Ernst Behler and Jochen Hörisch, (Paderborn, 1987), 160–173.
- "Nietzsche/Art/Postmodernism. A Reply to Jürgen Habermas," Stanford Italian Review (1988), 77–100.
- "Afterword", in: J.W. von Goethe, The Sorrows of Young Werther, Elective Affinities, Novella (II.4), 283–96.
- "Strukturwandel der Symbolik," in: Modelle des Literarischenstrukturwandels, ed. Michael Titzmann, (Munich, 1991).
- "Rhetoricality: On the Modernist Return of Rhetoric," with John Bender, in: The Ends of Rhetoric: History—Theory—Practice, (II.5)), 3–42. Reprinted in: Literature, Culture, And Society in the Modern Age. Essays in Honor of Joseph Frank, (Stanford, 1991), 76–123.
- "Foreword," in: Friedrich A. Kittler, Discourse Networks 1800–1900, (Stanford, 1990), vii-xxxiii.
- "Contingency," in: Critical Narratology, ed. Ann Fehn, Ingeborg Hoesterey, Ruth Angress, (Princeton, 1991).
- "Diskussionsbeitrag: New Historicism," in: Geschichte als Literatur, ed. H. Eggert, U. Profitlich, K. Scherpe (Stuttgart, 1990), 380–84.
- "Die Sprachpolitik der Aufklärung," Kodikas/Code. An International Journal of Semiotics (1990), 177–190.
- "The Pathos of Theory; Laokoon Revisited," in: Intertextuality: German Literature and Visual Art from the Renaissance to the Twentieth Century, ed. Ingeborg Hoesterey and Ulrich Weisstein, (Columbia, S.C., 1993), 47–63.
- "The Exteriority of Writing," Slr. Stanford Literature Review 9 (1992), 11–23. Translation: "Die Äußerlichkeit der Schrift," in: Schrift, ed. Hans Ulrich Gumbrecht and K. Ludwig Pfeiffer, (Munich, 1993), 337–348.
- "Zur Literaturwissenschaftlichen Relevanz des Kontingenz-begriffs. Eine Glosse zur Diskussion um den Poststrukturalismus," in: Poststrukturalismus – Dekonstruktion – Postmoderne, ed. Klaus Hempfer, (Stuttgart, 1992), 161–169.
- "Introduction," with Nancy Kaiser, in Traditions of Experiment, (II.8) 1–16.
- "Scheinvorgang. Kafkas Schweigen der Sirenen," in: Germanistik, Deutschunterricht und Kulturpolitik. Vorträge Des Augsburgergermanistentags 1991, ed. Johannes Janota, (Tübingen, 1993), vol. 3, 163–176.
- "Das Gesetz der Schönheit: Lessings Aesthetik der Repräsentation," in: Was ist Darstellung?, ed. Chr. L. Hart-Nibbrig, (Frankfurt, 1994), 175–204.
- "Morphisms of the Phantasmatic Body: Goethe's Sorrows of Young Werther," in: Bodies and Texts in the Eighteenth Century, ed. Veronica Kelly and Dorothea von Mücke, (Stanford, 1994), 181–208.
- "Die Geburt der Kunst / Zur ästhetischen Affirmation," in: Ethik der Ästhetik, ed. Chr. Wulf, Dietmar Kamper, Hans Ulrich Gumbrecht, (Berlin, 1994), 23–37.
- "Die Enden des Menschen: Anthroplogie und Einbildungskraft im Bildungsroman (Wieland, Goethe, Novalis)," in: Das Ende, Poetik und Hermeneutik XVI, ed. K. Stierle and R. Warning, (Munich, 1996), 600–639.
- "Interpretation vs. Lesen. Posthermeneutische Konzepte der Texterörterung," with responses by Jürgen Fohrmann and Klaus Weimar, in: Wie International ist die Literaturwissenschaft?, ed. Lutz Danneberg and Friedrich Vollhardt, (Stuttgart, 1995).
- "Das Gedicht. Systemtheorie und Literatursemiotik," in: Systemtheorie und Literaturwissenschaft, ed. Jürgen Fohrmann and Harro Müller (München, 1996), 331–348.
- "Heinz von Foerster at Stanford." Systems Research 13/3 (1996), pp. 417–21.
- "Zur Physiognomik des Genies: Goethe/Lavater. Mahomets Gesang," in: Geschichtender Physiognomik, ed. Rüdiger Campe and Manfred Schneider (Freiburg, 1996), pp. 331–356.
- "Die Strategie des Paradoxons. Nietzsches Auseinandersetzung mit der Aufklärung," in Aufklärung Als Form, ed. Helmut J. Schneider, (Würzburg: Königshausen & Neumann, 1997), pp.
- "Retrait/Re-entry. Zur poststrukturalistischen Metapherndiskussion," in: Poststrukturalismus: Herausforderung an die Literaturwissenschaft, ed. Gerhard Neumann (Stuttgart/Weimar, 1997), pp. 194–207.
- "Der Zug der Sinnlichkeit. Kants 'Beobachtungen über das Gefühl des Schönen und Erhabenen'", Weimarer Beiträge43 (1997), pp. 36–49.
- "Der Zufall der Geburt. Sternes Poetik der Kontingenz," in: Kontingenz, Poetik und Hermeneutik XVII, ed. G. von Graevenitz and O. Marquard (München, 1998), 291–317.
- "Verzauberung. Das Simulakrum in der romantischen Lyrik," in: Mimesis und Simulation, ed. Andreas Kablitz and Gerhard Neumann (Freiburg, 1998), pp. 452–477.
- "Übertragen: Metapher und Metonymie," in: Literaturwissenschaft - Einführungin das Sprachspiel, ed. Heinrich Bosse and Ursula Renner (Freiburg, 1999), pp. 139–155.
- "O que é (e nao é) antropologica literária?" in: Teoria da Ficção. Indagações `A Obra De Wolfgang Iser, ed João Cézar de Castro Rocha (Rio de Janeiro, 1999), pp. 179–189.
- "Die Ausblendung der Genese. Grenzen der systemtheoretischen Reform der Kulturwissenschaften," in: Widerstände der Systemtheorie. Kulturtheoretischeanalysen zum Werk von Niklas Luhmann, ed. Albrecht Koschorke und Cornelia Vismann (Berlin: Akademie Verlag, 1999), pp. 19–27.
- "August Langen," in Grundlagen der Literaturwissenschaft, ed. Bernhard Dotzler (Köln: Böhlau, 1999), pp. 389–91.
- "Die Form der Autonomie. Goethes Prometheusode," in: Prometheus. Mythos Derkultur, ed. Edgar Pankow and Günter Peters (Munich: Fink, 1999), pp. 109–126.
- "Mimesis e metafísica: sobre a estética de Schopenhauer," in: Máscaras da Mimesis. An Obra de Luiz Costa Lima, ed. Hans Ulrich Gumbrecht and João Cézar de Castro Rocha (Rio de Janeiro/ São Paulo: Editora Record, 1999), pp. 55–72.
- "The Romantic Transformation of Rhetoric," in Cambridge History of Literary Criticism: Romanticism, ed. Marshall Brown (London and Cambridge, 2000).
- “’Spude dich Kronos’: Zeitsemantik und poetologische Konzeption beim jungen Goethe,”in: Der Junge Goethe: Konstruktion und Genese Von Autorschaft, ed. Waltraud Wiethölter (Tübingen and Basel: A. Francke Verlag, 2001), pp. 164–182.
- “Kunst – Zeugung – Geburt: Überlegungen zu einer anthropologischen Grundfigur,” in: Kunst – Zeugung – Geburt: Theorien und Metaphern der Kunstproduktionin der Neuzeit, ed. Christian Begemann and David E. Wellbery (Freiburg: Rombach, 2002), pp. 9–36.
- “Goethes Lyrik und das frühromantische Kunstprogramm,” in: Goethe und die Romantik, ed. Walter Hinderer (Würzburg: Könighausen und Neumann, 2002), pp. 175–192.
- “Die Opfer-Vorstellung als Quelle der Faszination. Anmerkungen zum Chandos – Brief und zur Frühen Poetik Hofmannsthals,” in: Hofmannsthal – Jahrbuch zur Europäischen Moderne, Bd. 11 (2003), pp. 282–308.
- “Stimmung,” in: Historisches Wörterbuch Ästhetischer Grundbegriffe, hg. Karlheinz Barck et al., Bd. 5 (Stuttgart/Weimar: Metzler, 2003), pp. 703–33.
- “Einführung,” in: Michael Maar, Sieben Arten, Nabokovs Pnin Zu Lesen (Munich: Carl Friedrich von Siemens Stiftung, 2003), pp. 7–14.
- “Aesthetic Media: The Structure of Aesthetic Theory before Kant,” in: Regimes of Description. In the Archive of the Eighteenth Century, ed. John Bender and Michael Marrinan (Stanford, CA: Stanford University Press, 2005), pp. 199–211.
- “Rites de passage. Zur Erzählproblematik in E.T.A. Hoffmanns Prinzessin Brambilla,” in: Hoffmanneske Geschichten. Literaturwissenschaft Als Kulturwissenschaft am Beispiel E.T.A. Hoffmanns, ed. Gerhard Neumann, (Würzburg: Könighausen & Neumann, 2005).
