= Harro =

Harro is a given name. Notable people with the name include:

- Harro Adt (born 1942), German diplomat
- Harro Bode (born 1951), German sailor and Olympic champion
- Harro Harring (1798–1870), German-Danish revolutionary and writer
- Harro Heuser (1927–2011), German mathematician
- Harro Magnussen (1861–1908), German sculptor
- Harro Müller (born 1943), German literary scholar, professor and executive editor
- Harro Ran (1937–1990), Dutch water polo player
- Harro Schulze-Boysen (1909–1942), left-wing German publicist, WWII Luftwaffe officer

== See also ==
- Loothmann Harro, the pen name of German writer and poet Hans Heyck (1891–1972)
- Harrow (disambiguation)
