= Robert Herndon Fife Jr. =

American academic (1871–1958)

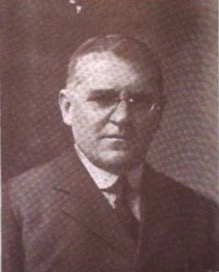
- Born: November 18, 1871; Charlottesville, Virginia, U.S.
- Died: January 8, 1958 (aged 86)
- Title: Gebhard Professor of German
- Spouse: Sarah G. Fife (m. 1913)

Academic background
- Education: University of Virginia (B.A. and M.A.); University of Leipzig (Dr. phil.)
- Doctoral advisor: Eduard Sievers; Albert Köster

Academic work
- Discipline: German Studies; Language pedagogy
- Sub-discipline: Modern German literature; Modern German history; Renaissance studies; Reformation Studies
- Institutions: Wesleyan University; Columbia University
- Notable students: Sol Liptzin; André von Gronicka

Robert Herndon Fife Jr. (November 18, 1871 – January 8, 1958) was an American academic who specialized in German studies and served as Gebhard Professor of German and Chair of the German Department at Columbia University. He was the founder of The Germanic Review, former President of the AATG and President of the MLA. Fife wrote on German history, German language and literature, Martin Luther, and German romanticism and edited works by Heinrich Heine, E. T. A. Hoffmann and Ludwig Tieck.

== Life and career ==
Robert Herndon Fife Jr. was born to Robert H. Fife, a farmer, and Sarah Strickler in Charlottesville, Virginia on November 18, 1871. He grew up with three sisters and three brothers and attended the Jones School, a private classical school in Virginia.

Fife received his B.A. and M.A. from the University of Virginia, where he was a member of Phi Beta Kappa. He went on to earn his doctorate at the University of Leipzig in Germany in 1901 under the direction of Eduard Sievers and Albert Köster. Fife was a German teacher at St. Alban's School in Radford, VA (1895-1898) before continuing studies at Göttingen and Leipzig from 1898 to 1901.

Fife's first position at an institution of higher education was as an instructor of German at Western Reserve University (1901-1903). From 1903 to 1905, he taught at the summer school at the University of Virginia prior to becoming an associate professor at Wesleyan University (1903-1905). At Wesleyan University, he remained a Marcus L. Taft Professor of German Language and Literature until 1920. After staying at Wesleyan University, Fife replaced Calvin Thomas as a professor of German at Columbia University in 1920 and upon his appointment at Columbia, received the Gebhard Professorship.

Fife became chair of the German department at Columbia University, founded The Germanic Review in 1926, and became the journal's first executive editor from 1926 to 1946. From 1927 to 1929, Fife was the associate dean of the Faculties of Political Science, Philosophy, and Pure Science at Columbia.

Fife served as president of the Modern Language Association in 1944 and president of the AATG in 1932. Fife also served as the chairman of the Committee on Modern Language Teaching of the American Council on Education. From 1919 to 1920, Fife was the president of Connecticut State Board of Charities. Fife was also a member of the Germanistic Society of America, the Virginia Historical Society, the American Council on Education, and the American-Scandinavian Foundation.

Besides his university activities, Fife was a trustee of the Connecticut State Hospital for the Insane, trustee of the Montclair Academy in New Jersey, vice-president of the Connecticut State Conference of Charities and Corrections, and secretary of the Connecticut Child Welfare Association (1918-1920). Fife developed German courses during World War I with the War Department Committee on Education and Special Training.

Fife was first married to Sarah Gildersleeve Fife, a prominent bibliophile and horticulture leader, from 1913 until death her death in 1949. They had no children together. Fife married his second wife, Hildegard E. Wichert, in 1952.

Fife died on January 8, 1958, in Brooklyn, New York.

== Honors ==
Fife was an Honorary Member of AATG in the 1950s. He received an Honorary Doctor of Humane Letters from Wesleyan University in 1920, an Honorary Degree from Columbia University, Litt.D. in 1929, an Honorary Degree from the University of Pennsylvania, Litt.D. in 1946, an Honorary doctor of letters from Washington and Lee University in 1949., an Honorary doctor of letters from Princeton University in 1949 and an honorary degree from Middlebury College, LittD. in 1955.

== Bibliography ==
=== Authored works ===
- Fife Robert Herndon. 1902. “Der Wortschatz Des Englischen Maundeville Nach Der Version Der Cotton Handschrift (Brit. Museum London) Titus C. Xvi.” Dissertation Dr. Seele.
- Fife Robert Herndon. 1916. The German Empire between Two Wars; a Study of the Political and Social Development of the Nation between 1871 and 1914. New York: Macmillan Company.
- Fife Robert Herndon. 1928. Young Luther: The Intellectual and Religious Development of Martin Luther to 1518. New York: Macmillan.
- Fife Robert Herndon and Carnegie Corporation of New York. 1932. Report of Professor Robert Herndon Fife on Tendencies in Education in East and South Africa with Particular Reference to Language Questions.
- Fife Robert Herndon. 1957. The Revolt of Martin Luther. New York NY: Columbia University Press.

=== Edited works ===
- Fife, Robert Herndon, ed.:Die Harzreise, (New York, H. Holt and company, 1912), also by Heinrich Heine.
- Fife, Robert Herndon, ed.:Die Harzreise und Buch Le Grand, (New York, H. Holt and Company, 1912), by Heinrich Heine.
- Fife, Robert Herndon, ed.:Meister Martin der küfner und seine gesellen. (New York, H. Holt and company, 1908), also by E. T. A. Hoffmann.
- Tieck Ludwig, Edwin H Zeydel, Percy Matenko Robert, Herndon Fife and Columbia University. 1937. Letters of Ludwig Tieck Hitherto Unpublished 1792-1853. New York London: Modern language Association of America; Oxford University Press.

=== Articles (selection) ===
- Fife, Robert Herndon. "I.—Jean Paul Friedrich Richter and ETA Hoffmann." PMLA 22, no. 1 (1907): 1-32.
- Fife Jr, Robert Herndon. "The German Romantic" Märchen"." Modern Philology 9, no. 2 (1911): 239-257.
- Fife, Robert Herndon. "Scholarship in the Secondary School." The Modern Language Journal 8, no. 4 (1924): 221–226.
- Fife, Robert Herndon. "The Place of Biography in German Literary History." Germanic Review 2 (1927): 119.
- Fife, Robert Herndon. "Some New Paths in Teaching German." The German Quarterly 1, no. 1 (1928): 7–17.
- Fife, Robert Herndon. "The Reading Objective." The German Quarterly 2, no. 3 (1929): 73–87.
- Fife, Robert Herndon. "The Teaching of Modern Foreign Languages: A National Survey." The Journal of Educational Research 23, no. 4 (1931): 296–307.
- Fife, Robert Herndon. "GERMAN IN LUTHER'S EARLY LECTURES." Germanic Review 6, no. 3 (1931): 219.
- Fife, Robert Herndon. "The Problem of Individual Freedom in the Humanists and in Goethe." Germanic Review 7 (1932): 291.
- Fife, Robert Herndon. "Humanistic Currents in the Reformation Era." Germanic Review 12 (1937): 75.
- Fife, Robert Herndon. "Epochs in German Literature." Germanic Review 14 (1939): 87.
- Fife, Robert Herndon. "Nationalism and Scholarship." PMLA 59, no. S1 (1944): 1282–1294.
- Fife, Robert Herndon. "Ulrich von Hutten as a Literary Problem." The Germanic Review: Literature, Culture, Theory 23, no. 1 (1948): 18–29.
- Fife, Robert Herndon. "The basis of literary history." PMLA 66, no. 1 (1951): 11–20.
