= Susan Delano McKelvey =

Susan Adams Delano McKelvey (1883–1964) was an American botanist and writer, noted for her work at the Arnold Arboretum. The standard author abbreviation McKelvey is used to indicate this person as the author when citing a botanical name.

== Early life ==
McKelvey was born as Susan Magoun Delano on March 13, 1883, in Philadelphia and was a member of the prominent Delano family of Massachusetts. Her parents were Eugene Delano (1844–1920) and Susan Magoun (née Adams) Delano (1848–1904). Her siblings included architect William Adams Delano and she was a cousin of Franklin Delano Roosevelt.

McKelvey graduated from Bryn Mawr College and in 1907 married a lawyer, Charles Wylie McKelvey (1878–1957). After one of their sons died, their marriage disintegrated and McKelvey moved to Boston in 1919. They eventually divorced in 1930.

== Career ==
McKelvey developed an interest in landscape design and started volunteering at the Arnold Arboretum with Charles Sprague Sargent. Soon, her interest shifted from landscape architecture to botany and she undertook a collecting expedition to Glacier National Park, followed by further fieldwork in the White Mountains in New Hampshire.

Early on, McKelvey took an interest in the Arboretum's growing lilac collection. She studied specimens in collections across the United States, Canada, France and England and consulted with growers in the United States and Europe. In 1925, she described a new species of lilacs (Syringa rugulosa). The culmination of this research, The Lilac: A Monograph, was published 1928 to great reviews, the first book to receive the Schaffer Medal of the Pennsylvania Horticultural Society. To date, it is still the only monograph published on the subject. In the same year, she was appointed to the committee to Visit the Arnold Arboretum by the Board of Overseers of Harvard University, a position she held for many years.

McKelvey next focused on the plants of the American Southwest. She made the first of several trips to the area in 1928, accompanied by Alice Eastwood, and focused on yucca, agave, and cactus specimens. She considered her next book to be on non-indigenous trees in the United States, but instead continued her research on yucca specimens. McKelvey's work in this area culminated in two volumes entitled Yuccas of the Southwestern United States, Part one and two, published nine years apart.

In the 1930s, McKelvey started to become recognised for her botanical work, she had articles published in Horticulture, the National Horticultural journal and the Journal of the Arnold Arboretum. In 1931, she became a research associate for Oakes Ames at the Arnold Arboretum and collaborated with the Botanical Museum in Cambridge, now part of the Harvard University Herbaria.

In her final years, McKelvey moved away from fieldwork and focused on research. Her final book, Botanical Exploration of the Trans-Mississippi West 1790–1850, published in 1956, was described as her masterpiece and was very well received in the press. Meticulously researched, it examines early expeditions in the Western United States, detailing the specimens collected by explorers including Lewis and Clark and including excerpts of their journals and findings. The book earned her the New York Botanical Garden's Sarah Gildersleeve Fife award for her literary work.

In 1964, McKelvey retired from her positions at the Arboretum and died shortly after on July 11, 1964, in Boston. Her collection of plant specimens and botany research were left to the Arnold Arboretum.

McKelvey frequently collaborated with Canadian American botanist Alice Eastwood, and with other botanists including the Arnold Arboretum's founding member Charles Sprague Sargent, and Karl Sax.

== Honours ==
- Centennial Gold Medal of the Massachusetts Horticultural Society (1929)
- Schaffer Medal of the Pennsylvania Horticultural Society (1929)
- Emily Renwick Achievement Medal (Garden Club of America)
- Sarah Gildersleeve Fife award of the New York Botanical Garden (1957)

== Works ==
- McKelvey, Susan Delano (1928). The lilac: a monograph. New York: The Macmillan Company. OCLC 476436291.
- McKelvey, Susan Delano (1936). The Arnold arboretum. OCLC 83422083.
- McKelvey, Susan Delano (1991). Botanical exploration of the trans-Mississippi West, 1790-1850. Corvallis, Oregon: Oregon State University Press. ISBN 9780870715136. OCLC 1052686671.
- McKelvey, Susan Delano (1938). Yuccas of the Southwestern United States: Part I. The Arnold Arboretum of Harvard University. OCLC 475382863.
- McKelvey, Susan Delano (1947). Yuccas of the Southwestern United States: Part II. The Arnold Arboretum of Harvard University. OCLC 475382874.
