= Sarah Gildersleeve Fife =

Sarah Gildersleeve Fife (28 Sep 1885 – 20 May 1949) was a prominent force among women bibliophiles in the first half of the 20th century and a leader in gardening and horticulture, advocating the use of plantings around army bases and military hospitals.

== Family background ==
Sarah Gildersleeve was born in Gildersleeve, Connecticut to Ferdinand and Harriet Northam Gildersleeve, the second of 4 children. Her family had been in Connecticut since the early 1600s and trace their origins in England for hundreds of years before that. Her grandfather, Philip, fought with Colonel Josiah Smith during the American Revolution. Colonel Smith's unit of 250 men was part of the Long Island Militia which fought under the leadership of George Washington in the Battle of Long Island. Later, Philip was a master carpenter on the USS Connecticut. She married Robert Herndon Fife, professor of Germanic languages and literature at Columbia University. They had no children. She died in Hartford, Connecticut.

== Advocate for women bibliophiles ==
In 1944, Fife helped found the Hroswitha Club of women book collectors in New York City and served as its first president. The club was named for Hrotsvitha, a 10th-century German secular canoness, as well as a dramatist and poet who lived and worked in the Abbey of Gandersheim, in modern-day Lower Saxony. The club gave women a place to exchange information about books and collecting. Until creation of the Hroswitha, there were no institutions available to women bibliophiles in the New York area. For example, it would not be until 1976 that the Grolier Club accepted its first woman member. In 1948 the club founded its library and the following year, following Mrs. Fife's death, named it the Sarah Gildersleeve Fife Memorial Library. The club held its 200th meeting in 1994 and continued until at least 1999. Many members eventually joined the Grolier Club.

== Garden Club of America ==
Sarah Fife was a local and national leader in American gardening. Her involvement with organized gardening began in the Connecticut town of Middleton where she became president of the garden club. As an affiliate of the Garden Club of America, she reported on their activities which included the establishment of a reference library. Her leadership in developing plantings around the public library was a harbinger of her later work, on a national level, to develop plantings around military hospitals.

The Garden Club of America provides leadership as the national organization of regional gardening clubs promoting conservation, coordinating activities, sharing knowledge and skills and advocating beautification projects at all levels of community life in America. A notable member of the club, she served on numerous committees, including the Bulletin, Flower Show, Horticultural and Library committee. It is perhaps for her work on the Committee for the Supervision of Redwood Grove that she made her most lasting impact. In 1931, the committee raised $75,000 (equivalent to over $1,000,000 in 2010) towards the purchase of a 2,552-acre tract of old-growth redwoods known as Canoe Creek Grove. This amount matched that donated by the California State Park Board Fund, making the purchase possible. The Canoe Creek Grove became part of what is now Humboldt Redwoods State Park.

In the late 1930s, Fife served alongside Mrs. Harriet Barnes Pratt as an officer of the Horticultural Society of New York during the period that the Horticultural Society was active in the preparations for the 1939 New York World's Fair. The Horticultural Society was a member of the non-profit corporation Hortus, the entity chosen for planning and administering the Gardens on Parade exhibit at the Fair.

As a result of her tireless and productive work, she was elected president and served from 1935 to 1938. She edited the club's periodical, The Bulletin, and during World War II was chairman of the club's committee on planting gardens at army camps and hospitals. In recognition of her outstanding contributions to the activities of the club and to American Gardening and Horticulture, the Sarah Gildersleeve Fife Award was created (see below). It is considered one of the Garden Club's highest honors. Fife's work assumed national importance with her service as a director of the Horticultural Society of New York and as a board member of the American Botanical Society in Washington, D.C.

== New York Botanical Garden ==
It was, perhaps, her service to the New York Botanical Garden for which she is most famous. First chosen for membership in the advisory council of the New York Botanical Garden in 1936, she became head of the council in 1940, a post she kept until her resignation in 1948. In its tribute to her, the board of managers of the NYBG said, in part;

"We, the Board of Managers and membership of The New York Botanical Garden assembled in annual meeting, feel that, through the untimely death of Mrs. Sarah Gildersleeve Fife on May 20, 1949, the Garden has lost a most beloved associate and friend, and we desire to express our sense of the value of the services rendered by Mrs. Fife. As member of the Advisory Council and its Chairman from December 4, 1940 to December 2, 1948 and through membership on other committees of the Board, she gave devoted and loyal service to the Garden."

=== Sarah Gildersleeve Fife Award ===
Following her death, a memorial fund was established at the New York Botanical Garden to support awards to be given, jointly with the Garden Club of America, for "exceptionally fine publications, unusual design in planting, horticultural research and other rare accomplishment or service to the world of gardening." In establishing the Fund, the Garden wrote,

"For many years, Sarah Gildersleeve Fife gave generously and continuously of her heart and intellect to further all aspects :of gardening and horticulture. Her deep devotion and love for the Garden Club of America and its publication The Bulletin, :and for the New York Botanical Garden, brought to these organizations benefits and blessings beyond computing."

The first award from this fund was given in 1952. There have been many notable recipients of this prestigious award. Among them are;

- Alden Hopkins, best known for his restoration of the gardens of Colonial Williamsburg and the University of Virginia.
- Bassett Maguire, a renowned expert on Amazonian flora,
- Susan Delano McKelvey, cousin of president Franklin Roosevelt and expert on the genus Syringa (lilacs)
- Joseph Wood Krutch, American writer, critic and naturalist
- Helen Morgenthau Fox, American botanist and author of popular gardening books
- Lanning Roper, American-born landscape architect commissioned by Prince Charles in 1981 to do the grounds at Highgrove House in the Cotswolds
- Margery Claire Carlson, associate professor emeritus at Northwestern University and associate researcher at the Field Museum with major contributions in Central American flora

=== Fife Collection at the NYBG Library ===
In 1949, Mrs. Fife bequeathed 440 volumes as well as a collection of pamphlets, reprints and periodicals to the library. These materials constitute a named collection within the LuEsther Mertz Library of the NYBG. Among the exceptional titles donated by Mrs Fife are,

- 1890 London edition of Charles Darwin's voyage on HMS Beagle Voyage of H.M.S. Beagle
- An early volume by J.C. Loudon on the noted British landscape gardener and architect, Humphry Repton. Landscape Gardening and Architecture of Humphry Repton
