= Dulcitius (play) =

10th-century drama by Hrotsvitha

Passio sanctarum virginum Agapis Chioniae et Hirenae (The Passion of the Holy Virgins Agape, Chionia, and Irena), more commonly known as Dulcitius, is a Latin comedy written by Hrosvitha of Gandersheim, a member of the female Abbey of Gandersheim in Lower Saxony. Written between 935–973, Dulcitius is widely believed to be her most comic work. The play treats the figure of Dulcitius, governor of Thessalonica, as a subject for a comedy in the style of Terence. Although the play is dark, with a plot that depicts the imprisonment and martyrdom of the three sisters, Agape, Chionia, and Irena, nevertheless its content is presumably deemed less grave because of the reward awaiting the Christian sufferers.

== Plot ==
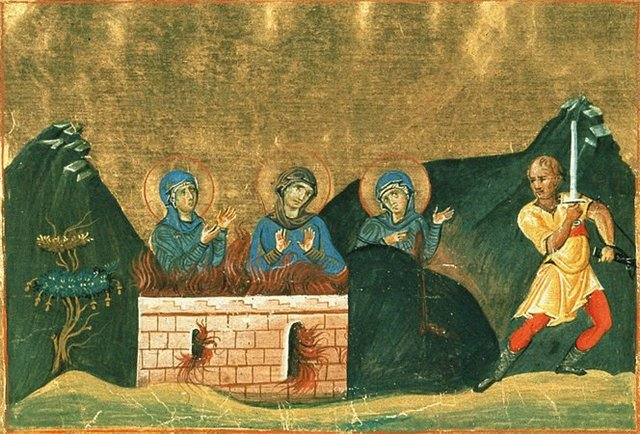
Agape, Chionia, and Irena depicted in the Menologion of Basil II

The Roman Emperor Diocletian wants members of his imperial court to marry three virgin sisters: Agape, Chionia, and Irena. He insists the sisters renounce their Christian faith and worship the Roman gods. When they refuse, the emperor orders them imprisoned and examined by Governor Dulcitius. Dulcitius sees how beautiful the sisters are and tells his soldiers to lock them in the kitchen so he "can visit them oftener".

That night Dulcitius embraces the pots and pans in the dark kitchen, thinking they are the women. He leaves covered in soot, and the soldiers think he is possessed. Not realizing he is covered in soot, Dulcitius goes to the palace to tell the imperial court he has been insulted. He is beaten and denied admittance to the palace because the ushers do not recognize him. In retaliation for his embarrassment, he commands that Agape, Chionia, and Irena be stripped in public. However, the soldiers are unable to remove the robes from the women's bodies.

Since Dulcitius is sleeping, the soldiers tell Diocletian what has happened. The enraged emperor orders Count Sisinnius to punish the sisters. Sisinnius believes that the younger Irena will change her views if she is no longer influenced by her older sisters. He orders Agape and Chionia burned alive when they refuse to sacrifice to the Roman gods. Their spirits leave their bodies, but their bodies and clothes miraculously are not burned.

Sisinnius threatens Irena with execution, but she refuses to renounce her faith. He orders the soldiers to take her to a brothel, but they quickly return and tell Sisinnius that Irena has escaped. Two men came to them and said Sisinnius wanted her taken to the top of a mountain. Sisinnius and the soldiers go to the mountain, but are unable to go up. As Irena stands at the top, Sisinnius orders one of the soldiers to shoot her with an arrow. She dies looking forward to heaven.

== Characters ==
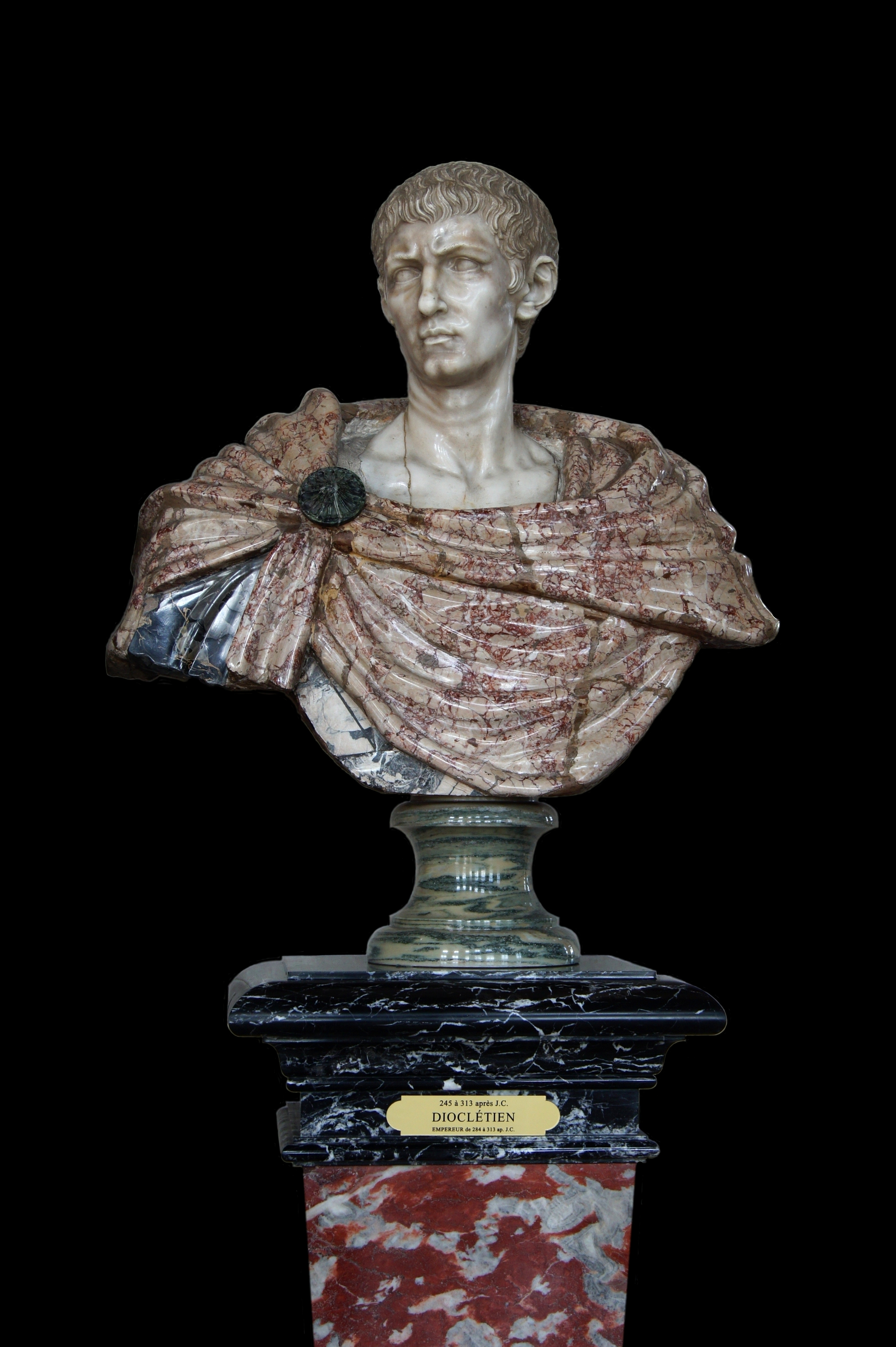
A bust of Diocletian

The characters in the play, in order of appearance:

- Emperor Diocletian
- Agape
- Chionia
- Irena
- Dulcitius
- Soldiers
- Ushers of the palace
- Wife of Dulcitius
- Ladies-in-waiting of Dulcitius' wife
- Sisinnius

== Background and writing ==
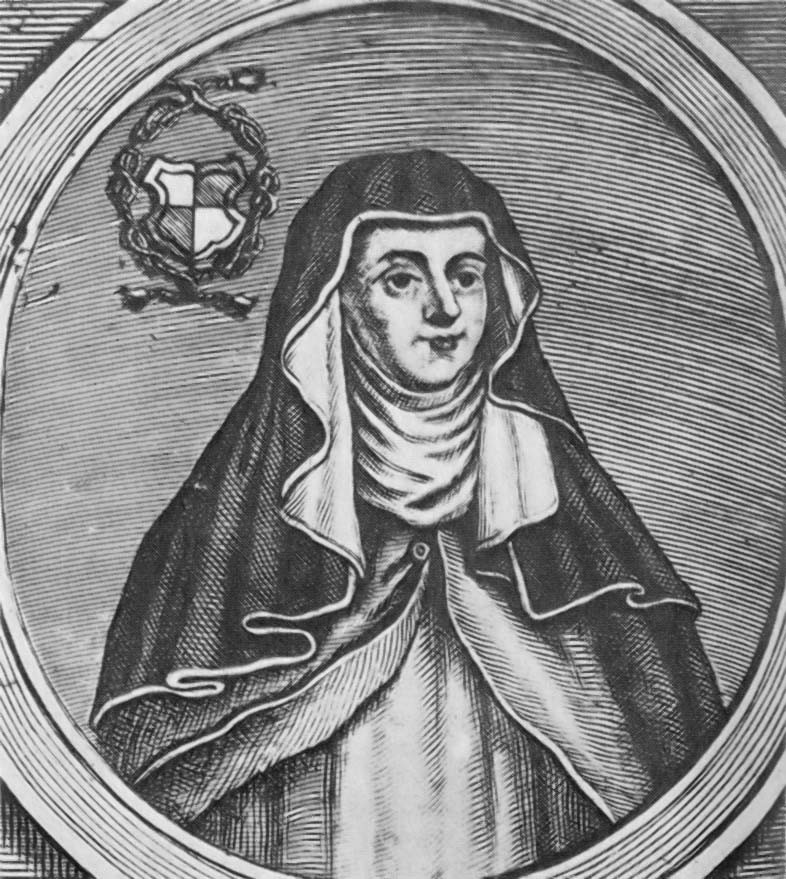
Hrosvitha of Gandersheim

There is little information on Hrosvitha's life and background. According to information she provided in Carmen de Primordiis Coenobii Gandersheimensis, she was born a long time after the death of Otto the Illustrious (November 30, 912), but was older than the daughter of Henry, Duke of Bavaria, Gerberga II (born after the year 940). Based on this information, Hrosvitha was born between 912 and 940, though historians generally agree that her date of birth is closer to 935.

Hrosvitha divided her work into three books: Liber Primus, Liber Secundus, and Liber Tertius. The first book is poetry, while the second book has the six plays she is largely known for, including Dulcitius. The third book contains poetry and also the text from which historians have been able to deduce her approximate year of birth.

The playwright Terence was an influence on Hrosvitha. She copied his style in the praising of virgins. In Hrosvitha's preface to her collection, she acknowledges Terence's influence, noting that her plays provide an alternative for those who appreciate Terence's style. Her approach substitutes "the laudable chastity of holy maidens" for his "unchaste actions of sensual women". This relationship between Terence and Hrosvitha represent a link between classical drama and the medieval morality plays.

The story for Dulcitius comes from traditions about the lives Agape, Chionia, and Irene, three Christian saints. The traditional version is recounted as historical prose in the Acta Sanctorum (Acts of the Saints), a 17th-century hagiography.

== Analysis ==
=== Title and genre ===
The play's original title was Passio Sanctarum Virginum Agapis Chioniae Et Hirenae ("The Passion of the Holy Virgins Agape, Chionia, and Irena"), but has become more commonly known as Dulcitius because he serves as the central character in the comedic scenes. Dulcitius is considered to be Hrosvitha's most comedic work. However, just 56 lines out of 286 lines in the play are considered to be comedic and Dulcitius is only present in the first part of the play. Because of his limited presence, some have criticized Hrosvitha for creating no connection between the plotline of Dulcitius' adventures and that of the martyrdom of the three women.

=== Portrayal of women ===
Hrosvitha's plays are believed to be aimed towards the Christian ideal of the virginal woman, and intended for reading rather than for performance. Her intention was likely for her plays to be read aloud by the Sisters of her convent. However, some scholars dismiss the solely Christian context of Hrosvitha's writings, instead claiming that her plays provided women with models for female integrity, thus encouraging more positive views of women.

In her book Ravishing Maidens, Kathryn Gravdal frames the kitchen scene with Dulcitius as an attempted rape, but says Hrosvitha creates a comedic reversal of expectations. When he embraces the filthy pots and pans in the dark, Dulcitius unknowingly has an unwanted sexual experience while the women watch and make fun of him.
