= Abraham (Hrotsvitha play) =

Latin play by Hrotsvit of Grandersheim

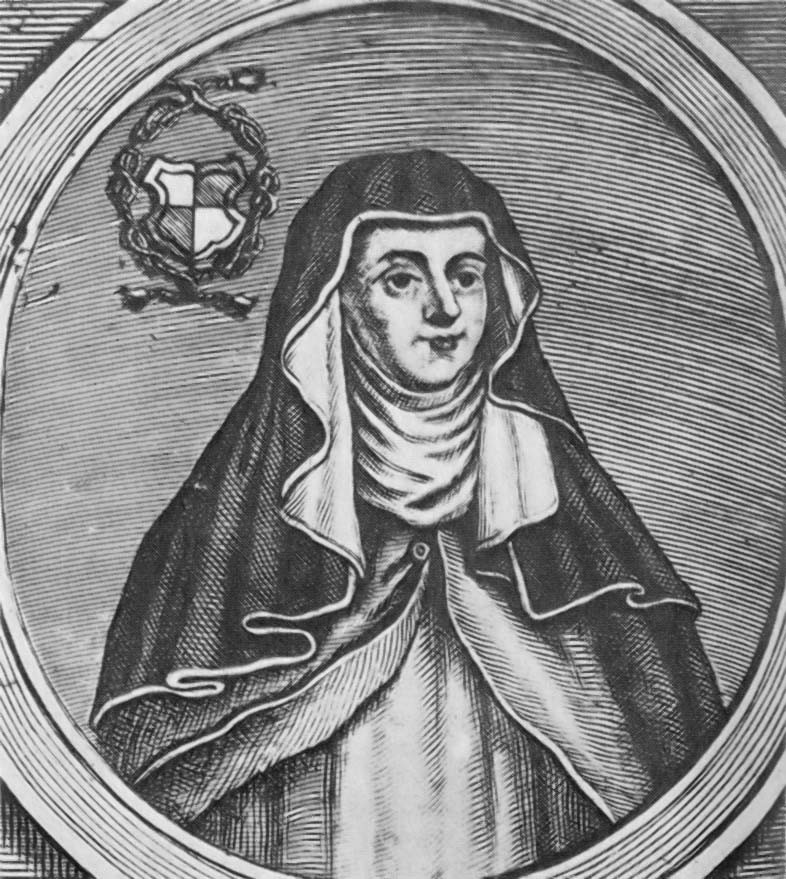
Illustration of Hrotsvit

Abraham or Fall and Redemption of Mary is a play in Latin written by Hrotsvit of Grandersheim (c. 935–973).

The play follows a young orphan, Mary, who is persuaded by her uncle Abraham, a hermit, and his companion, Effrem, to lead a life of complete chastity and devotion to God. When Mary submits to temptation and loses her virginity, she flees her religious life to become a prostitute. Years later, when Abraham comes to her disguised as a lover, Mary returns to her life of devotion and submits to a strict regimen of penance. Hrotsvit's play is considered a story about the divine forgiveness and the power of Mary's redemption.

== Characters ==
- Abraham - a hermit
- Effrem - a hermit
- Mary - Abraham's niece
- A Friend of Abraham
- The Master of an Inn

== Summary ==
=== Scene 1 ===
In the desert near Lampsacus, Abraham approaches his co-hermit, Effrem, outside of his cell and asks for a moment to talk. Effrem assures Abraham that as long as their talk is in praise of God, he is at Abraham's service. Abraham seeks Effrem's advice about what to do with his eight-year niece, whom Abraham has recently received custody of after the death of her parents. Abraham reveals that he loves the young orphan immensely and is worried about conserving her purity. Her name, Mary, compels him to initiate her into a monastic noviciate, and he asks Effrem for support in leading her down this path. Effrem obliges, and the two hermits set off to see her.

=== Scene 2 ===
In Abraham's cell, Abraham and Effrem talk to Mary. Abraham asks Mary if she is willing to live a life of chastity in order to follow in the footsteps of her namesake Mary, the first of all virgins. Effrem notes the mystical significance of her name, persuading the young child that her place is alongside Mother of God in Heaven. After commenting that she sees nothing mystical in her name, Effrem explains that 'Mary' stands for 'Stella Maris', meaning the star around which the world revolves. It is called 'Stella Maris' because it never sets and provides constant guidance for sailors steering their course. Mary wonders how she, "a poor frail creature made from the dust of the earth" live up to such a name. Effrem declares that she can do so by keeping remaining a virgin. If she does so, he asserts, she will be freed of her earthly body and eventually arrive in Mary's bridal chamber, in the arms of her Son. Excited by Effrem's rhetoric, Mary exclaims that she will deny herself in order to be worthy of those heavenly blessings. Effrem and Abraham are elated about her concession but decide that Abraham should build a little cell close to him from which he can watch her and guide her.

=== Scene 3 ===
Four years later, Abraham returns to Effrem's cell will bad news. Overcome with sorrow, he announces that Mary has run away. He tells Effrem that a man dressed as a monk made visits to the girl and seduced her. After having sex with the man, Mary become overwhelmed with remorse. Feeling unable to redeem herself, she chose to abandon her monastic commitment. Effrem is shocked by the news and wonders how Mary had been able to escape without Abraham noticing. Abraham discloses that two days before Mary's disappearance, he had a nightmare in which a massive snake dashed outside his cell and grabbed a little white dove that was by his side. The snake devoured the dove and vanished. Thinking that his dream indicated a threat to the Church, he prayed to God for two days, asking Him to reveal the dream's meaning. In a second dream, the snake fell dead at his feet, and the dove reappeared unharmed. When he woke from this dream.

Abraham realized that he had not heard Mary's usual singing for the past two days. He rushed to her cell, and found she had disappeared. Eventually, some people came by and informed him that Mary had "given herself up to the lusts of the world." No one knows where she has gone, but Abraham tells Effrem of his plan to enlist a friend who travels often. Abraham has asked this man to find her. When Abraham learns of her whereabouts, he will go to her disguised as a lover, in order to convert her back to her godly life. Effrem accepts this plan but asks what Abraham will do if he has meat or wine put before him while charging in the secular world. Abraham asserts that he must not refuse the meat or wine, so he will remain undetected. Condoning this, Effrem claims that in order to win back a soul for Christ, it is alright to stray from religious asceticism.

=== Scene 4 ===
Two years later, a man dressed as a soldier approaches Abraham at his cell. Realizing the man is his friend who he had sent to look for Mary, Abraham readily greets him. Abraham's friend tells of Mary's occupancy at a house of "ill-fame" where she receives many lovers. The brothel is owned by a man who pays her well. Aghast at the news, Abraham demands a horse and an officer's uniform and hat. The friend gives him his disguise, and Abraham decides to take some gold so he can pay the master of Mary's house.

=== Scene 5 ===
In the town of Assos, Abraham approaches the inn where Mary resides. The Master of the Inn greets Abraham, and Abraham asks for a place to stay. Once Abraham has received the man's hospitality, he asks see the young girl about whom he has heard great things. The man praises Mary's youth, telling Abraham that she "outshines all the other women."

=== Scene 6 ===
In a room at the inn, the Master of the Inn brings Mary to Abraham. In an aside to the audience, Abraham calls on his personal strength to be able to see her "decked out in the guise of a harlot." He must preserve his disguise and not show his true feelings about her. When he sees her, Abraham asks Mary to give him a kiss. When she embraces Abraham, she recognizes Abraham's scent, but cannot place it. Mary begins crying, telling the audience "How far have I fallen, and into what a sink of iniquity!' When the Master of the Inn asks her why she cries, she exclaims that she wishes she had died before she fell into this disgraceful way of life. Abraham consoles the girl, and the three sit down for supper. When they have finished their meal, Mary tells Abraham to go to bed, where she will visit him.

=== Scene 7 ===
When Mary and Abraham enter a bedroom at the inn, Abraham tells Mary to lock the door so that no one can come in. When Abraham takes off his disguise, Mary reveals her angelic life is lost. He asks her why she deserted him without telling him of her fall from grace. He and Effrem would have done penance on her behalf. Mary says that she could not bear to approach him in her defiled state. Abraham explains that human nature is to sin, and it is not the man who sins who deserves condemnation, but the man who fails to rise up from the sin.

Hearing this, Mary falls at Abraham's feet. She stares at the ground, unable to look at him, believing that she does not deserve pardon. Abraham reasons with her to drop her despair and accept his guidance. Mary submits herself to his wishes. She says that she will walk behind him in his footsteps back to his cell, but Abraham demands that she will ride on his horse to protect her feet. Mary vows to devote herself to God.

=== Scene 8 ===
Mary and Abraham arrive at Abraham's cell. When Abraham points out her empty cell, she is terrified of going in and facing her sin. Agreeing that Mary should avoid the place where "the Enemy has triumphed," Abraham tells her to occupy a different cell where the Serpent will not find her. He tells her that he will go to visit Effrem and tell him news of her return.

=== Scene 9 ===
Outside Effrem's cell, Abraham tells Effrem that he has brought Mary back. Abraham tells his co-hermit that Mary has surrendered to her strict penance. She has put on a hair vest and is continuously fasting so that her body can bow to the will of her soul. The two men rejoice in the forgiveness of God. The lift their hands to God, and praise Him for His mercy.

== Hrotsvit ==
Hrotsvit, also known as Hrotswitha, was a tenth-century Saxon canoness. She came from an aristocratic background and settled at Gandersheim, where she had access to the abbey's extensive library. During her time at Gandersheim, Hrosvit wrote six plays influenced by Roman comic playwright, Terence. In the preface to her plays, Hrosvit addresses this influence: "I...have not hesitated to imitate in my writings a poet [Terence] whose works are so widely read, in order to glorify, within the limits of my poor talent, the admirable chastity of Christian virgins in the same form which has been used to describe the shameless charms of sinful women." Hrostvit's project, therefore, was to write plays that redeem women from the moral depravity of Terence's work and to put forth an alternative narrative in which women are spiritually steadfast and courageous. In accordance with this mission, Hrosvit's heroines overcome obstacles in the preservation of their Christian virtue. That virtue usually takes the form of virginity – a central motif in Abraham.

== Feminist reception and criticism ==
Abraham, along with Hrotsvit's other five plays, has been the object of much feminist criticism. Scholars have disagreed about whether the play empowers women or reinforces oppressive systems. In her book Feminism and Theatre, Sue-Ellen Case writes of Hrotsvit's popularity among pioneers of the suffrage movement. British suffragettes such as Edith Craig mounted Hrotsvit's plays and embraced the female playwright as a protofeminist hero.

Contemporary critics have written nuanced assessments of Hrotsvit's story of Mary's fall and redemption. Stephen L. Wailes frames Abraham as a "contest of flesh and spirit...waged around Maria," in his essay, Beyond Virginity: Flesh and Spirit in the Plays of Hrotsvit of Gandersheim. He argues that although the play deals with Mary's virginity, the central trial of Abraham is not her loss of virginity, but her power to overcome disgrace and despair through penance. Because Mary fell from grace, she is able to restore her faith with new strength and significance, ultimately bringing that power to others.

M.R. Sperberg-McQueen takes a more skeptical look at the feminist implications of Abraham. In Whose Body is it? Chaste Strategies and the Reinforcement of Patriarchy in Three Plays by Hrotswitha von Gandersheim, Sperberg-McQueen argues that Mary's identity and agency are stripped from her throughout Abraham. The suppression begins when Abraham and Effrem force their interpretation of the name, Mary, onto the young orphan. By conflating her with the Virgin Mary, Abraham and Effrem are setting Mary up for failure, impossibly demanding that the mortal little girl should live her life as a divine figure. In insisting that Mary eventually become the bride of Christ, Abraham deepens his male bond with God at Mary's expense. Sperberg-McQueen also suggests that Abraham was the perpetrator of Mary's seduction and that Mary was the victim of incest by Abraham. Despite her devotion to God, Mary's burgeoning womanhood becomes a mark of difference and temptation for Abraham. Overcome with the shame of this incest, Mary is compelled to escape. Only through an excruciating regimen of penance can Mary afford to live alongside Abraham again. By abusing her female body, Mary no longer becomes an object of temptation for Abraham.

Regula Meyer Evitt also posits that Abraham committed incest in her essay, Incest Disguised: Ottonian Influence at Gandersheim and Hrotsvit's "Abraham". She notes that the circumstances surrounding Mary's loss of virginity are decidedly ambiguous. Not only is Abraham's role in Mary's loss of virginity dubious, but his disguise as a lover later in the play is also exploitative. When disguised as a lover, Abraham pursues Mary's kisses. Evitt suggests proposes that with Abraham's disguise, Hrotsvit is "demonstrating how male incestuous desire can present itself in disguise." In this way, Hrotsvit may be offering a subversive commentary on male desire and spiritual corruption in Abraham.
