= Rainer Nägele =

Liechtensteiner-American literary scholar (1943–2022)

Rainer Nägele (August 2, 1943 – May 12, 2022) was an American literary scholar whose research primarily focused on modern German and comparative literature. He was the author of several books, including Reading after Freud: Essays on Goethe, Hölderlin, Habermas, Nietzsche, Brecht, Celan, and Freud. Nägele was the Alfred C. & Martha F. Mohr Professor Emeritus of German Language and Literature at Yale University.

== Life and career ==
Nägele was born in Triesen, Liechtenstein. He completed his Abitur in St. Gallen, Switzerland, and Balzers, Liechtenstein. He studied at the University of Innsbruck (Austria) and the University of Göttingen and earned his Ph.D. in 1971 at the University of California, Santa Barbara. His dissertation was titled "Formen der Utopie bei Friedrich Hölderlin". Nägele was an assistant professor of German at the University of Iowa from 1971 to 1973 and an associate professor at Ohio State University from 1973 to 1975 before joining the faculty of the German department at Johns Hopkins University in 1975. He became a full professor in 1979 and continued to teach at Johns Hopkins until 2006. Nägele was the chairman of the German department at Johns Hopkins from 1987 to 1993. He was a professor of German at Yale University from 2006 and held the Mohr Professorship until his retirement in 2016.

Nägele was on the editorial board of the New German Critique, The German Quarterly, Studies in 20th Century Literature, MLN and Comparatio. He advised the editorial board of the Historical Critical Edition of Hölderlin (Frankfurt edition).

He was a Guggenheim fellow in 1988 and a Distinguished Visiting Scholar at the Ohio State University in 1990. Nägele was also a visiting professor at the University of Aarhus in Denmark and University of Hamburg in Germany.

== Research ==
Nägele dealt with literary theory, aesthetics, philosophy, and psychoanalysis and focused his research on German and comparative literature from the 18th to 20th centuries. In Reading after Freud: Essays on Goethe, Hölderlin, Habermas, Nietzsche, Brecht, Celan, and Freud, Nägele draws out the importance of changed understandings of temporality and history due to Freud's works in analyzing texts after Freud and the meaning of "after". Like several other works, the essays do not create a complete theory but repeatedly analyze material anew. This particular approach and style of reading texts are used in Darstellbarkeit: Das Erscheinen des Verschwindens (2008), a collection of essays, each with a "new beginning, a new departure, a new attempt, a new essay." In Echoes of Translation: Reading Between Texts, Nägele develops a practice of reading focusing more on the idea of constellation of elements, rather than on their totality. Nägele's research covered many figures: Pindar, Sophocles, Hölderlin, Goethe, Keller, Nietzsche, Rilke, Baudelaire, Rimbaud, Brecht, Trakl, Kafka, Celan, Artaud, Böll, Handke, Heiner Müller, Martin Walser, Freud, Lacan, and Benjamin.

== Bibliography ==
=== Authored books ===
- Heinrich Böll. Einführung in das Werk und die Forschung. Frankfurt a. M.: Fischer-Athenäum Taschenbuch Verlag 1976.
- Peter Handke. München: C.H. Beck Verlag 1978. (with co-author R. Voris).
- Literatur und Utopie. Versuche zu Hölderlin. Heidelberg: Lothar Stiehm Verlag 1978.
- Text, Geschichte und Subjektivität in Hölderlins Dichtung: Uneßbarer Schrift gleich. Stuttgart: Metzler 1985, 256 pp.
- Reading after Freud. Essays on Goethe, Hölderlin, Habermas, Nietzsche, Brecht, Celan, and Freud. New York: Columbia University Press 1987.
- Theater, Theory, Speculation: Walter Benjamin and the Scenes of Modernity. Baltimore: Johns Hopkins University Press 1991.
- Echoes of Translation. Reading Between Texts. Baltimore/London: Johns Hopkins University Press 1997.
- Lesarten der Moderne. Essays. Eggingen: Edition Isele 1998.
- Literarische Vexierbilder. Drei Versuche zu einer Figur. Eggingen: Edition Isele 2001.
- Echos: Übersetzen. Lesen zwischen Texten. Basel: Urs Engeler Editor 2002.
- Hölderlins Kritik der poetischen Vernunft. Basel: Urs Engeler Editor 2005.
- fort / da. topobiographien. Bozen: Edition Sturzflüge 2005.
- Darstellbarkeit. Das Erscheinen des Verschwindens. Basel: Urs Engeler Editor, 2008.
- Der andere Schauplatz: Büchner, Brecht, Artaud, Heiner Müller. Stroemfeld Verlag, 2013.

=== Edited books ===
- Walter Benjamin. Special Issue of Studies in 20th Century Literature 11, 1 (1986).
- Benjamin's Ground. New Readings of Walter Benjamin. Detroit: Wayne State University Press 1988.
- Liechtensteiner Exkurse I: Im Zug der Schrift. Munich: Wilhelm Fink Verlag 1994.
- Liechtensteiner Exkurse II: Was wäre Natur? Eggingen: Edition Isele 1995.
- Liechtensteiner Exkurse III: Aufmerksamkeit. Eggingen: Edition Isele 1998.
- Liechtensteiner Exkurse IV: Kontamination. Eggingen: Edition Isele 2001.
- Liechtensteiner Exkurse V: Das wilde Denken. Eggingen: Edition Isele 2004
