= Inge D. Halpert =

Inge D. Halpert (August 5, 1926, Berlin, Germany – July 30, 2004, New York, New York) was an academic, German professor, Chair of the German Department at Columbia University, and executive editor of The Germanic Review. She was the author of several textbooks for language learning.

== Life and career ==
Inge Halpert was born on August 5, 1926, in Berlin, Germany, and later moved to Austria. Her mother was half-Jewish. She grew up in Vienna before emigrating in 1941, traveling through France and Spain and eventually to New York City. Halpert left Germany right before the Nazis began transporting Jews in Berlin to concentration camps in Poland.

Inge Halpert remained in New York and completed a B.A. at Hunter College in 1948 before attending Columbia University to earn her M.A. in 1950 and Ph.D. in 1957. Her dissertation was titled "Hermann Hesse and Goethe, with particular reference to the relationship of Wilhelm Meister and Das Glasperlenspiel."

Halpert began to teach at the School of General Studies at Columbia University in 1950, the only university division that allowed women to teach at the time. At Columbia, Halpert became an assistant professor of German in 1957, an associate professor in 1961, full professor in 1973, and chairman of the German department in 1978 until her retirement in 1992. Halpert was also the executive editor of The Germanic Review from 1984 to 1996.

In the early 1980s, the Columbia University German department lost its only two tenured professors, Joseph Padur Bauke and William Jackson, who had both recently died. Halpert was the only senior faculty and helped the department rebuild itself and maintain a high level of scholarship.

After her retirement, Halpert was involved in community services with Columbia University. Halpert died of lymphoma on July 30, 2004.

== Bibliography ==
=== Textbooks ===
- Madrigal Margarita and Inge D Halpert. 1962. See It and Say It in German. New York: New American Library.
- Halpert Inge D. 1966. Auditory and Reading Comprehension Exercises in German. New York: Regents Pub.
- Halpert Inge D and Ellen Von Nardroff. 1971. In Wort Und Schrift : Advanced German Conversation and Composition. New York: Appleton-Century-Crofts.
- Halpert, Inge D. "Proben deutscher Prosa. Ein Literaturlesebuch mit Hör-und Sprechübungen." (1971)

=== Articles (selection) ===
- Halpert, Inge D. "The Alt-Musikmeister and Goethe." Monatshefte (1960): 19–24.
- Halpert, Inge D. "Vita activa and vita contemplativa." Monatshefte (1961): 159–166.
- Halpert, Inge D. "Wilhelm Meister and Josef Knecht." The German Quarterly 34, no. 1 (1961): 11–20.
