= Hrotsvitha =

German canoness and poet (c. 935–973)

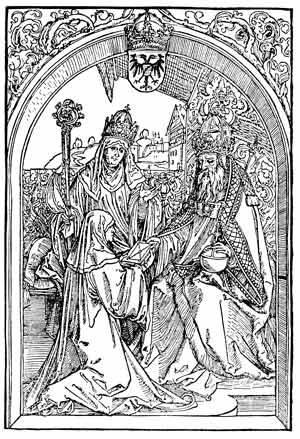
Hrotsvitha of Gandersheim presents an aged emperor Otto the Great with her Gesta Oddonis, under the eyes of Abbess Gerberga. 1501 woodcut by Albrecht Dürer.

Hrotsvitha (c. 935–973) was a secular canoness who wrote drama and Christian poetry under the Ottonian dynasty. She was born in Bad Gandersheim to Saxon nobles and entered Gandersheim Abbey as a canoness. She is considered the first female writer from the Germanosphere, the first person since the Fall of the Roman Empire to write dramas in the Latin West, and the first German female poet.

Hrotsvitha's six short dramas are considered to be her most important works. She is one of the few women who wrote about her life during the early Middle Ages, making her one of the only people to record a history of women in that era from a woman's perspective. She has been called "the most remarkable woman of her time", and an important figure in the history of women.

Little is known about Hrotsvitha's personal life. All of her writing is in Medieval Latin. Her works were rediscovered in 1501 by the humanist Conrad Celtes and translated into English in the 1600s.

Hrotsvitha's name (Latin: Hrotsvitha Gandeshemensis) appears in various forms including: Hrotsvit, Hrosvite, Hroswitha, Hroswithe, Rhotswitha, Roswit, Roswindis and Roswitha. It means "a mighty shout", and speaks to the way she wanted to glorify Christian heroes and legends, as well as the values they represent. Some have commented on how this either represents or conflicts with the personality presented in her writing.

While many have questioned the authenticity of Hrotsvitha's work, examinations and collections of her works, coupled with multiple historical and contemporary works that speak of her, demonstrate that Hrotsvitha's work is authentic. Feminist scholars have argued that this questioning of the authenticity of Hrotsvitha's work reflects a sexist narrative rather than revealing a flaw in her work or that she did not exist, as individuals have been engaging with her work for hundreds of years, and with increased intensity since her rediscovery during the German Renaissance.

== Life and background ==
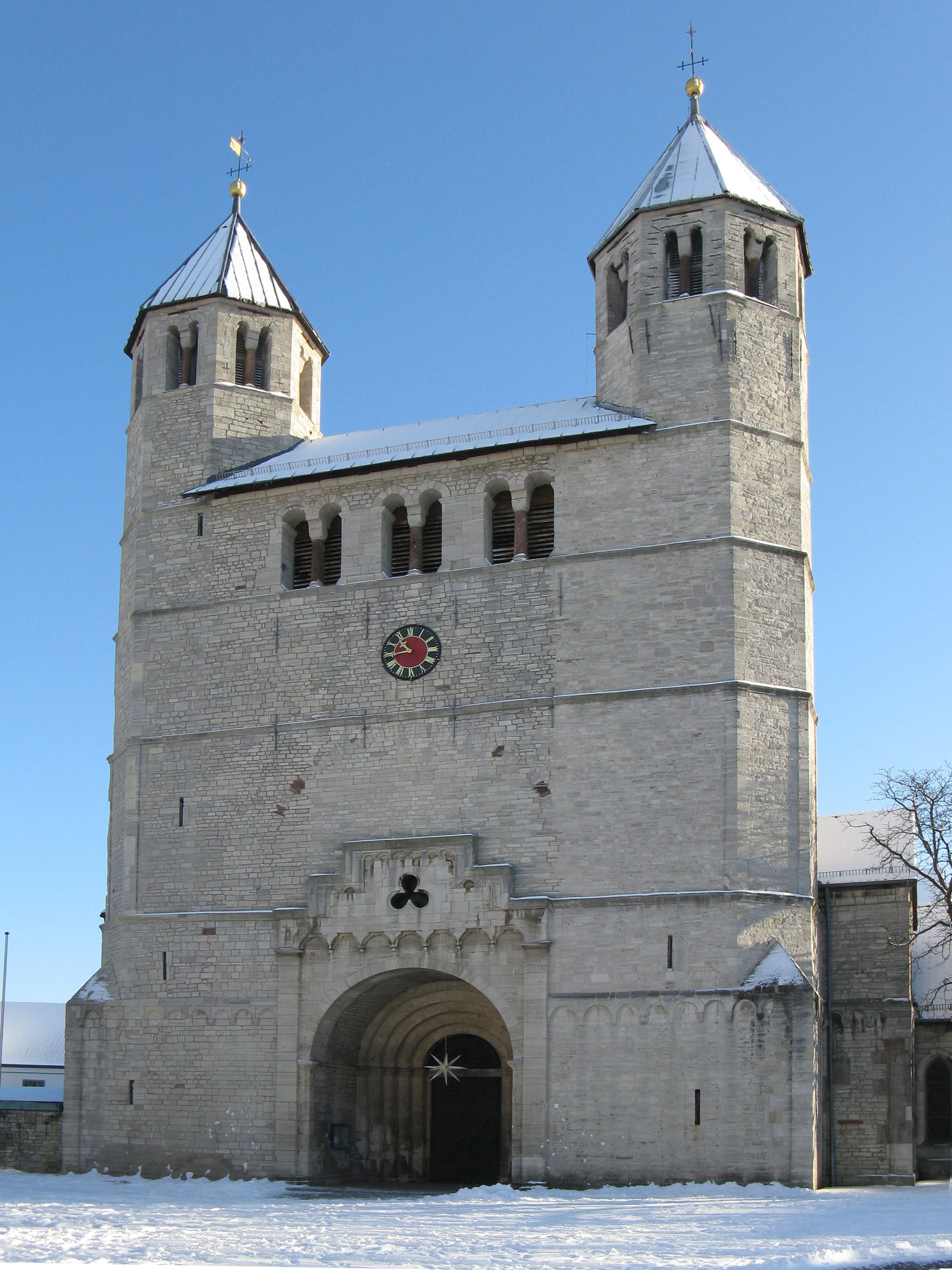
Gandersheim abbey church

All the information about Hrotsvitha comes from the prefaces of her work, and later interpretations of her writings. It is generally accepted that Hrotsvitha was born in approximately 935 and died in 973. Little is known of her lineage, or why she took the veil.

Gandersheim Abbey was a house of secular canonesses. There is some debate over when she entered. Hrotsvitha took vows of chastity and obedience but not poverty. She could live a relatively comfortable life and leave the monastery at any time, all while being protected, studying from a large library, and learning from many teachers. This speaks to her economic position as being from a noble family. Hrotsvitha began her studies under the nun Rikkardis, who was younger than she. She also studied under the Abbess Gerberga, granddaughter of King Henry the Fowler. Abbess Gerberga became a friend and adviser of Hrotsvit. She was a good student who read many works popular at the time with a particular focus on legends about saints and would have spent much of her time learning how to write verse. Hrotsvitha herself became a teacher in her 20s.

As her writings demonstrate a rather mature perspective, they may have been written when she was older. She had a good grasp of the legal system, the history of the Ottonian dynasty and their line of succession. Hrotsvitha was the first Northern European to write about Islam and the Islamic empire. She was both educated and well informed. Her use of myths indicates a specific perspective as she writes about the importance of Christianity—with a focus on virginity, martyrdom, and the strength of Christian values—in the face of the threat Islam posed.

At first, Hrotsvitha wrote in secret until she was encouraged to read her works out loud and edit them. The Abbess encouraged her to continue writing. Hrotsvitha primarily wrote legends, comedies, and plays. Her Books of Legends or Carmina liber primus was written in the 950s or 960s and was written in honor of Abbess Gerberga. It contains eight legends written in dactylic hexameter. Her most popular work was The Book of Drama, or Liber Secundus, which offered a Christian alternative to the work of the Roman playwright Terence. In contrast to Terence, who told stories about women who were weak and morally corrupt, Hrothsvitha stories were about virtuous virgins with a strong connection to God and who persevered through adversity. Hrotsvitha's third book contains the Gesta Ottonis, which details the history of the Ottonians from 919 to 965; and the Primordia coenobii Gandeshemensis, the history of Gandersheim Abbey.

== Works ==
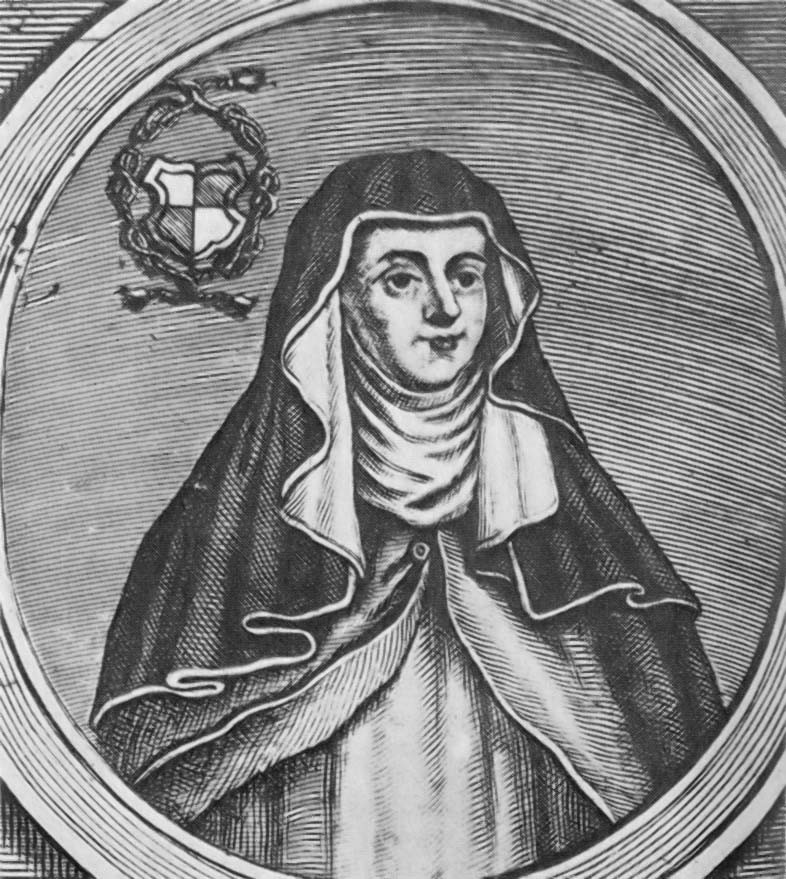
Roswitha of Gandersheim

Hrothsvitha's works fall under the categories of legends, comedies, and plays. Cardinal Gasquet said her works have "a claim to an eminent place in medieval literature, and do honor to her sex, to the age in which she lived, and to the vocation which she followed." The works are organized chronologically and speak to how Hrotsvitha valued the Christian approach to life.

Despite Hrothsvitha's importance as the first known female playwright, her work was not seen as important and translated into English until the 1600s. She is often omitted in texts about the history of plays and literature.

The most important manuscript of her works, containing all the texts other than Primordia, is the Codex Bayerische Staatsbibliothek (Bavarian State Library) Clm 14485, a manuscript written by several different hands in Gandersheim toward the end of the 10th or start of the 11th centuries. It was discovered by the humanist Conrad Celtis in 1493/94 in the Cloister of St. Emmeram in Regensburg and formed the first edition (illustrated by Albrecht Dürer).

=== Liber Primus ===
The Book of Legends is a collection of eight legends: "Maria", "Ascensio", "Gongolfus", "Pelagius", "Theophilus", "Basilius", "Dionysius", and "Agnes". All are written in Leonine hexameter except "Gongolph", which is written in rhymed distichs. "Theophilus" and "Basilius", are based on Latin translations of the vitae of Greek saints, and are versions of the Faustian tradition, in which a sinner sells his soul to the Devil. Hrotsvitha supplements the story with her description of Theophilus in The Seven Arts: De sophiae rivis septeno fonte manantis.

A common theme throughout is the constant battle between good and evil. The Devil is a frequent presence in many of Hrosvitha's works, and she characterizes him according to the conventions of her time. In "Dionysius" and "St. Agnes" she recounts the martyrdoms of early Christians. The Liber Primus reflects Hrotsvitha's interest in combining classical forms with Christian themes, and her desire to create literature that promotes Christian morality and virtue.

=== Liber Secundus ===
The Book of Drama presents a Roman Catholic alternative to Terence. These are the six plays: "Gallicanus", "Dulcitius", "Calimachus", "Abraham", "Pafnutius", and "Sapientia". They are essentially love stories, written in prose, and are not so much dramas as "dialogues." Though initially considered medieval examples of closet drama, recent scholarship has shown that Hrotsvitha was associated with the theatrical exploits of the Ottonian court and, furthermore, within the context of the Gandersheim cloister, it is possible that her plays may have been staged or, at least, read aloud.

As the earliest known woman writer in the German lands, Hrotsvitha was keenly aware that her gender made her writings less likely to be taken seriously than that of her male contemporaries. In the prologue to The Book of Legends, Hrotsvitha says: "Scorn he should not render at the writer's weaker gender/ Who these small lines had sung with a woman's untutored tongue/ But rather should he praise the Lord's celestial grace."

In general, Hrosvitha's plays were works of hagiography. All six speak to a consistent theme in Hrothsvitha's work, the virtue of virginity over temptation.

Her plays contrast the chastity and perseverance of Christian women with Roman women, who were portrayed as weak and emotional. Hrotsvitha wrote her plays in response to those of Terence, a popular Roman playwright who she thought unfairly represented women as immoral. She writes, "Wherefore I, the strong voice of Gandersheim, have not hesitated to imitate a poet (Terence) whose works are so widely read, my object being to glorify, within the limits of my poor talent, the laudable chastity of Christian virgins in that self-same form of composition which has been used to describe the shameless acts of licentious women."

All these dramas serve a discreet purpose. "Gallicanus" and "Calimachus" focus on conversion, "Abraham" and "Pafnutius" tell stories of redemption and repentance, and "Dulcitius" and "Sapientia" tell stories of virgin martyrdom. Cumulatively they speak to the power of Christ and Christian values, which was Hrothsvitha's objective. They are known to have been performed many times since her death, the earliest confirmation of which was in Paris in 1888.

She writes in her preface that her writing will appeal to many who are attracted by the charm of style. There are comedic elements, as in "Dulcitius", when the wicked blind governor stumbles among pots and pans, having attempted to molest three virgins. The women watch and laugh. Although they go on to become martyrs for their faith, they do so on their own terms. "Dulcitius" is the only one of Hrotsvitha's comedies which aligns with the modern comedic genre.

=== Liber Tertius ===
The third book is dedicated to Emperors Otto I and Otto II, and consists of two historical writings in Latin hexameters. Gesta Oddonis tells the story of the Ottonian dynasty, and its rise to power; and Primordia Coenobii Gandeshemensis tells the history of Gandersheim Abbey.

== Legacy ==
=== Feminism ===
Hrothsvitha's work was largely ignored until Conrad Celtis rediscovered and edited her work in the 1500s. In the 1970s, feminists began their own rediscovery of her work under a gendered lens to re-contextualize it to demonstrate that women of the past did have important roles in their societies, but their work was lost or not seen as important. Feminists have done this re-contextualization to learn about women's history, while not claiming that these women were feminists, to emphasize the importance of women throughout history even if they are forgotten. Because of this, Hrotsvitha has continued to garner much attention in the field of feminism studies, helping to provide a better sense of historical acknowledgement, accomplishment, and significance to women through the Canoness' work.

==== Representation of women ====
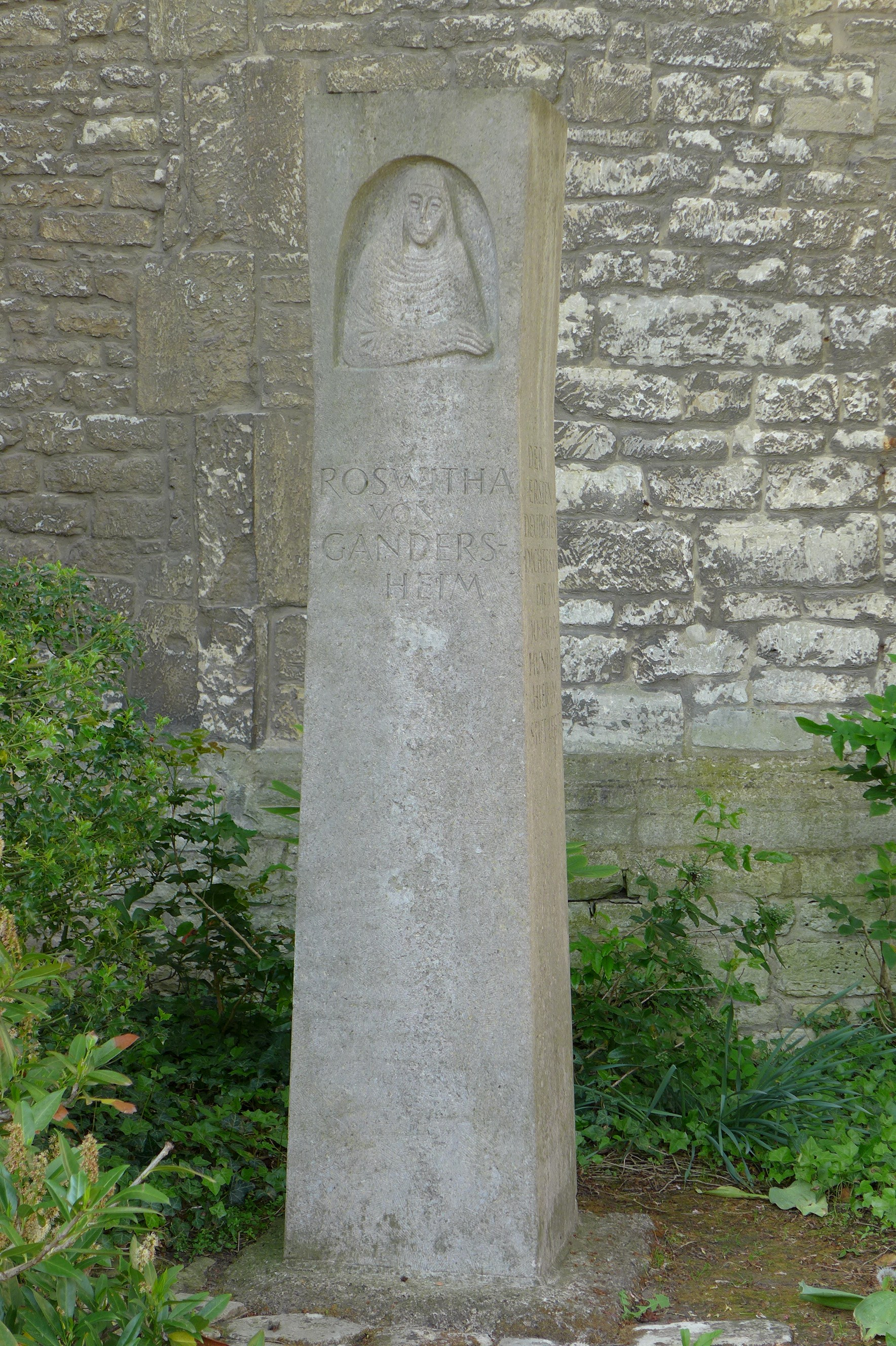
Hrotsvitha memorial in Gandersheim

Hrotsvitha's writing mimics Biblical texts. According to A. Daniel Frankforter, Hrotsvitha seems to confirm the assumption that woman's work was inferior, by saying that any excellence in her work is the excellence of God, not her own, although this may also merely be a standard literary convention of the time.

Hrotsvitha depicted women as having the power of self-determination and agency through taking the veil and abstaining from sexual relationships. This presents a very progressive view of women and their power in older societies, highlighted by various researchers that studied how Hrotsvitha's work often reflected the lives of women of her time. While she writes of women as virtuous, courageous, witty, and close to God she only speaks about one man without contempt, finding that they are disproportionately susceptible to temptation. Hrotsvitha sees women being the weaker sex as allowing God to more easily work through them to find grace for their salvation and the salvation of those with whom they come in contact. This, therefore, suggests that women are not less than men in the eyes of God. Hrotsvitha believes that a virginal life dedicated to Jesus is best, but she can be empathetic towards mothers, and even prostitutes, thus demonstrating a keen understanding of women's lives and options at the time.

Hrotsvitha plays focus on the issues that affect women of her time such as marriage, rape, and being seen as an object. "Dulcitius", deals with rape, a common issue and form of oppression that women experience. It is even argued that Hrotsvitha's work of "Dulcitius" acted as a reflection to lives of women in her hometown of Gandersheim, living in a hostile environment targeted by an extrinsic threat that is male in nature, showing the possible focus she gives towards women and feminism as a whole. In "Callimach", a woman, who has been the subject of an attempted rape, prays for death. God grants her prayer and she dies before the man can resume his attack. Taken by her beauty the man goes to her grave and attempts intercourse with her corpse, but is killed by a venomous serpent. Both of these plays show a key to Hrothsvitha's work: that religion can provide women with freedom and independence, allowing them to empower themselves.

==== Impact on Theatre ====
Hrothsvitha contributes to the work of women in theatre by supporting the concept that "as long as there is theatre, as long as there are women, as long as there is an imperfect society, there will be women's theatre". Hrothsvitha's plays served the purpose of speaking truth to power and counterbalancing male dominance of the field.

The significance of her plays is often overlooked because their dramaturgy diverges from what Sue-Ellen Case and Jill Dolan theorize as to the male values of good playwriting, which excluded Hrotsvitha, rather placing focus upon alternative fields, such as religion, early life, and sexuality, to name a few.

== Translations ==
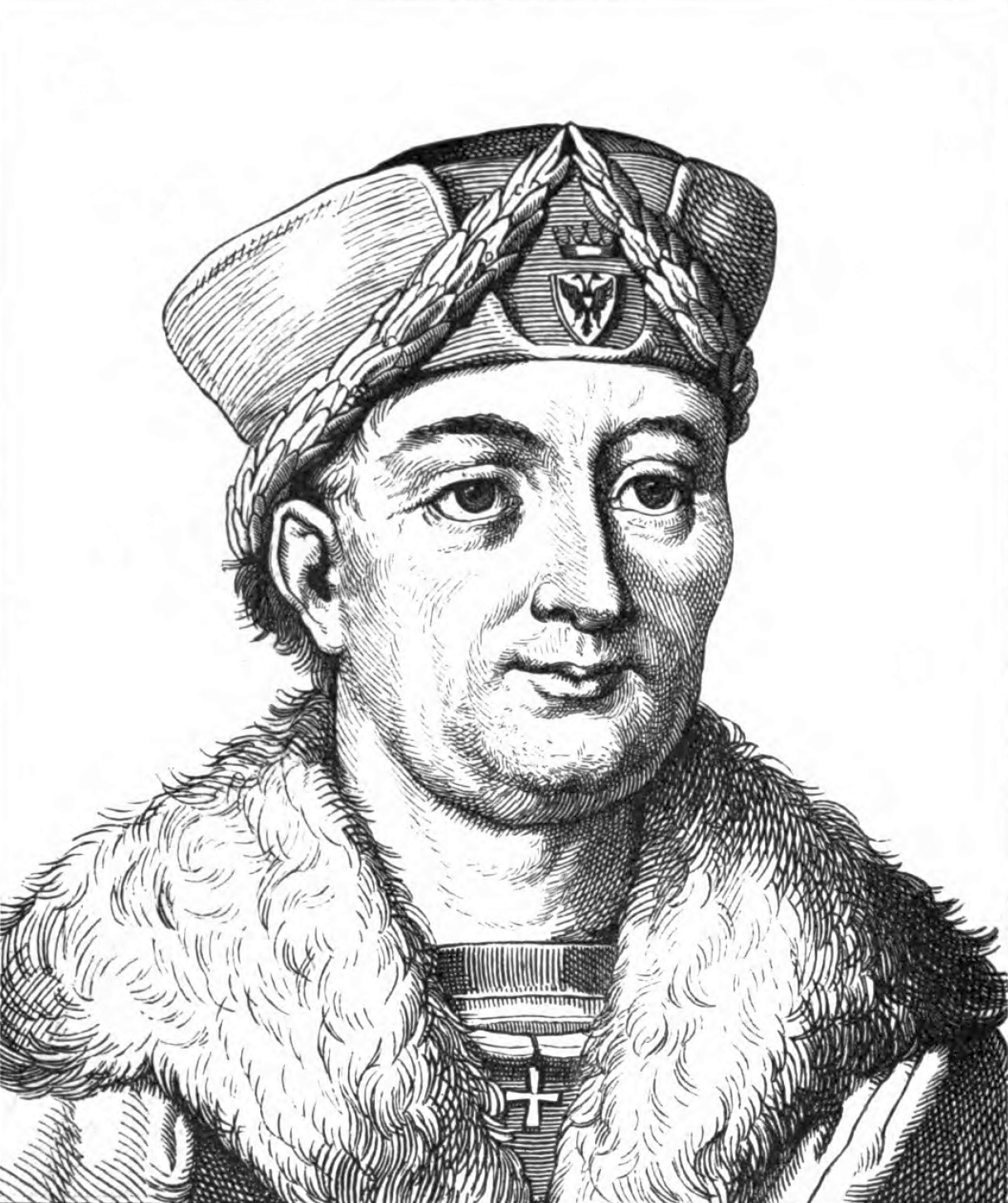
Conrad Celtis

Hrotsvitha's work was largely ignored until re-discovered and edited by Conrad Celtis in the early 16th century. Since then many authors have taken up the work of translating and editing them. Often these works are filtered through the perceptions and unconscious bias of the translator., It is believed that the naming of Hrotsvitha plays after men and not women may have been done by Celtis and not Hrotsvitha as her works largely center women and their experiences, making these titles appear inconsistent with what is presented in her work. It has been suggested that Celtis may have misrepresented her work due to his own implicit biases. While the translator Christabel Marshall appears to impose her own understandings of what a 10th-century canoness would be like or would have thought by making her seem timid in her translations. Katharina Wilson does a similar thing in Hrothvitha's work by translating her to seem more humble than she actually is. This has led some to posit that Colleen Butler is the person who best represented Hrotsvitha's work, as she discerned its true comedic nature by being able to deduce the unwritten context in the writing. However, while there may be some small misrepresentations of Hrothvitha's work, her message, and the known facts about her life remain relatively consistent..

Texts and translations

- Winterfeld, Paul von (ed.) (1902) Hrotsvithae opera. (Monumenta Germaniae Historica; SS. rer. Germanicarum) Available from Digital MGH online.
- Strecker, Karl (ed.) (1902) Hrotsvithae opera.
- Roswitha of Gandersheim. The Plays of Roswitha. Trans. Christopher St. John. London: Chatto, 1923. ISBN 978-1296739898.
- Hrotsvit von Gandersheim, Sämtliche Dichtungen; aus dem Mittellateinischen übertragen von Otto Baumhauer, Jacob Bendixen und Theodor Gottfried Pfund; mit einer Einführung von Berg Nagel. München: Winkler, 1966.
- Hrotsvitha von Gandersheim. Munich, 1973 (German translations by H. Hohmeyer).
- Pelagius in Petroff, Elizabeth Alvilda, ed. (1986) Medieval Women's Visionary Literature, pp 114–24. ISBN 0-19-503712-X
- Abraham in Petroff, Elizabeth Alvilda, ed. (1986) Medieval Women's Visionary Literature, pp 124–35. ISBN 0-19-503712-X
- Berschin, Walter (ed.). Hrotsvit: Opera Omnia. Bibliotheca Scriptorum Graecorum et Romanorum Teubneriana. Munich/Leipzig, 2001. ISBN 3-598-71912-4
- Hrotsvitha Gandeshemensis, Gesta Ottonis Imperatoris. Lotte, drammi e trionfi nel destino di un imperatore. A cura di Maria Pasqualina Pillolla, Firenze, SISMEL Edizioni del Galluzzo, 2003
- The Plays of Hrotswitha of Gandersheim: bilingual edition / translated by Larissa Bonfante; edited by Robert Chipok. Mundelein, IL: Bolchazy-Carducci, 2013. [Latin and English on facing pages.] ISBN 978-0-86516-783-4
- Robert Gary Babcock, ed. and trans. The Works of Hrotsvit of Gandersheim. Dumbarton Oaks Medieval Library 90. Cambridge, MA, 2025.

== Modern-day references ==
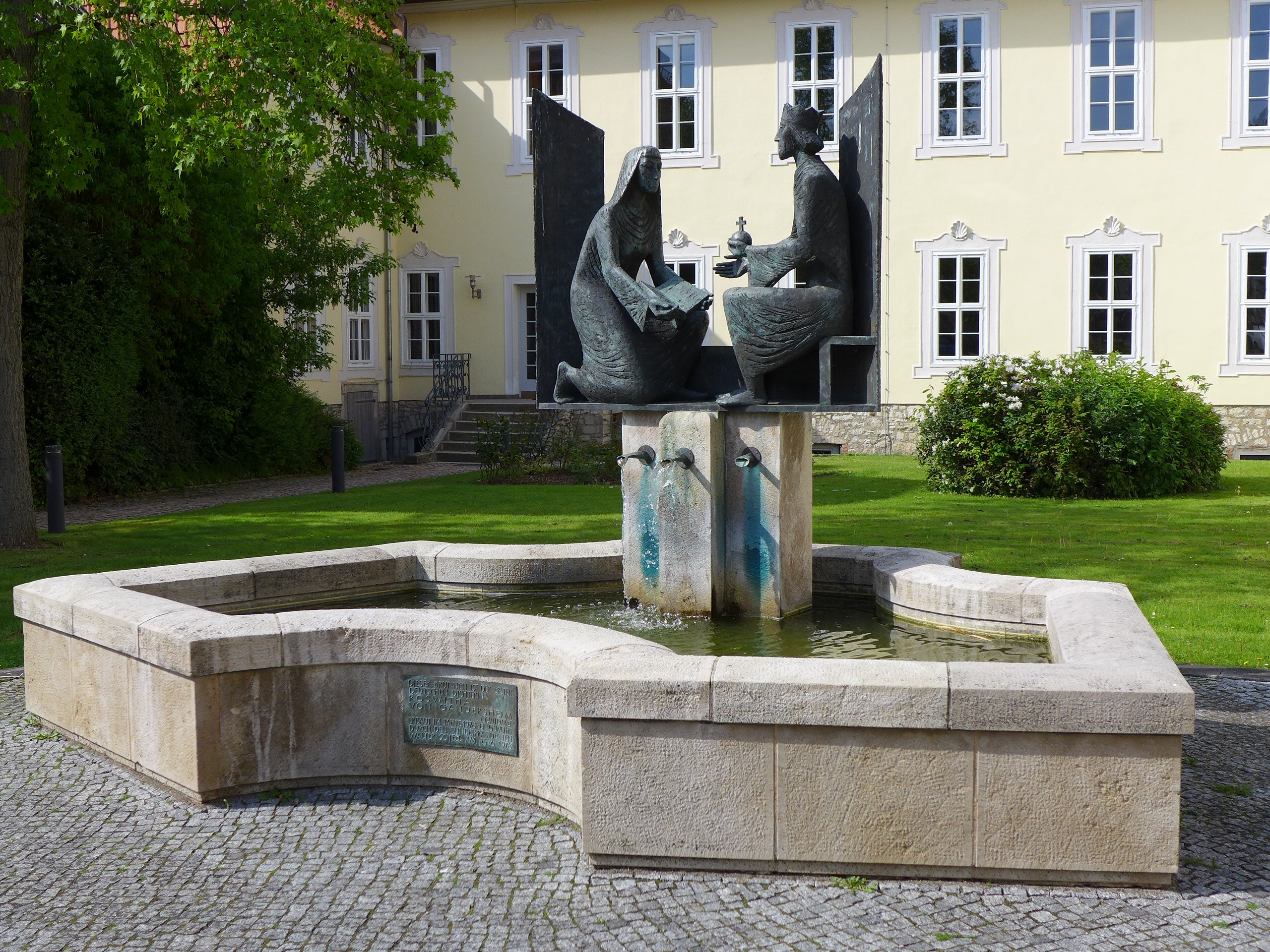
Hrotsvitha fountain, Gandersheim

- The asteroid 615 Roswitha discovered in 1906 is named in her honor.
- The Hroswitha Club is an association of women book collectors founded in New York City in 1944. Members included co-founder Sarah Gildersleeve Fife and Frances Hooper. The club published Hroswitha of Gandersheim: Her life, times, and works in 1965.
- Since 1973 Bad Gandersheim has annually awarded the Roswitha Prize, named for Hrosvitha, to female writers; since 1974 the Roswitha Ring has been awarded at the close of each summer season of the Gandersheimer Domfestspiele to the outstanding actress.
- Hrotsvitha is frequently referred to in John Kennedy Toole's 1980 comic novel A Confederacy of Dunces, in which she is called Hroswitha.
- In 2006, American feminist drama group Guerrilla Girls On Tour issued the "First Annual Hrosvitha Challenge" on their website, announcing that they would bestow the First Annual Hrosvitha Award on whichever professional theater decides "to scrap their plans of producing yet another production of a Greek tragedy and instead produce a play by Hrosvitha, the first female playwright".

== See also ==
- Canoness

== Bibliography ==
- Wilson, Katharina M (1984), "The Saxon Canoness: Hrotsvit of Gandersheim", Medieval Women Writers, Manchester: Manchester University Press, pp. 30–63, ISBN 978-0-8203-0641-4.
- Croft, Susan (editor, 2019), "Paphnutius" (extract) in Classic Plays by Women, London: Aurora Metro Books. ISBN 978-1910798782.
