= 615 Roswitha =

Main-belt asteroid

Discovery
- Discovered by: August Kopff
- Discovery site: Heidelberg
- Discovery date: 11 October 1906

Designations
- Alternative designations: 1906 VR

Orbital characteristics
- Epoch 21 November 2025 (JD 2461000.5)
- Uncertainty parameter 0
- Observation arc: 113.38 yr (41411 d)
- Aphelion: 2.9221 AU (437.14 Gm)
- Perihelion: 2.3404 AU (350.12 Gm)
- Semi-major axis: 2.6312 AU (393.62 Gm)
- Eccentricity: 0.11052
- Orbital period (sidereal): 4.26 yr (1559 d)
- Mean anomaly: 83.6172°
- Mean motion: 0° 13^{m} 51.024^{s} / day
- Inclination: 2.7624°
- Longitude of ascending node: 13.3855°
- Time of perihelion: 23 November 2024
- Argument of perihelion: 246.416°
- Earth MOID: 1.325 au
- Jupiter MOID: 2.126 au
- T_{Jupiter}: 3.389

Physical characteristics
- Mean diameter: 48.626±0.277 km
- Synodic rotation period: 4.422 h (0.1843 d)
- Geometric albedo: 0.020±0.008
- Spectral type: CX
- Absolute magnitude (H): 10.47

615 Roswitha is a minor planet orbiting the Sun. It is named after Hrotsvitha, also referred to as "Roswitha."
