= Harro Müller =

Harro Müller (born 1943) is a German literary scholar, Emeritus Professor of Germanic languages at Columbia University, a former Chair of the German department at Columbia (1996-1999), and a former executive editor of The Germanic Review (1996-2002).

== Career ==
Haro Müller received his doctorate with a focus in German studies, history, and philosophy from the University of Cologne in 1975, after which he completed his habilitation in Bielefeld in 1979. Müller joined the faculty of the German department at Columbia University in 1991 and was Chair of the Department from 1996 to 1999.

Müller replaced Inge D. Halpert as the executive editor of The Germanic Review in 1996, a position he held until 2002. Müller still serves as the senior editor at The Germanic Review, along with Andreas Huyssen. Müller was also the vice-president of the Groupe de Recherche sur la Culture de Weimar at the Maison des Sciences de L'Homme, Paris (1991-2008).

Müller was a visiting professor at Cornell University (1982), Emory University (1987), the University of Bordeaux (1988), and at Columbia (1991).

Müller's research interests include literary history and theory, focusing on hermeneutics, deconstruction, discourse theory, critical theory, poststructuralism, systems theory, intellectual history and history of literary criticism. He has written on Adorno, Benjamin, Benn, Brecht, Büchner, Dilthey, Döblin, Foucault, George, Gibbon, Grabbe, Habermas, Horkheimer, Kleist, Kluge, Luhmann, de Man, H. Mann, H. Müller, Schuldt, Schiller, Storm and Weiss.

== Bibliography ==
=== Books ===
- Theodor Storms Lyrik, Bonn 1975
- Ed. with Jürgen Fohrmann, Diskurstheorien und Literaturwissenschaft, Frankfurt 1988
- Geschichte zwischen Kairos und Katastrophe, Frankfurt 1988
- Giftpfeile, Bielefeld 1994
- Ed. with Susanne Knaller, Authentizität, München 2006
- Gegengifte, Bielefeld 2009
- Taubenfüße und Adlerkrallen, Bielefeld 2016

=== Articles (selection) ===
- with Nikolaus Wegmann. "Tools for a genealogical literary historiography." Poetics 14, no. 3-4 (1985): 229-241.
- "Kleist, Paul de Man und deconstruction." Argumentative Nach-Stellungen, S. 90f (1988).
- "A few poisoned arrows wouldn't be so bad: Ten interjections on the connection between historical theory, hermeneutics, and literary historiography." Poetics 16, no. 1 (1987): 93-102.
- "Gottfried Benns paradoxer Antihistorismus. Einige Überlegungen über Zusammenhänge zwischen ästhetischem Absolutismus und faschistischem Engagement." In Geschichte als Literatur, pp. 182–195. JB Metzler, Stuttgart, 1990.
- "Schreibmöglichkeiten historischer Romane im 19. und 20. Jahrhundert." The Germanic Review: Literature, Culture, Theory 69, no. 1 (1994): 14-19.
- with Larson Powell. "Luhmann's systems theory as a theory of modernity." New German Critique 61 (1994): 39-54.
- with Jan Mieszkowski. "Identity, Paradox, Difference: Conceptions of Time in the Literature of Modernity." MLN 111, no. 3 (1996): 523-532.
- "Walter Benjamin's critique of historicism: A rereading." The Germanic Review: Literature, Culture, Theory 71, no. 4 (1996): 243-251.
- "Geschichte, Allegorie, historisches Drama. Sieben Notizen zu Georg Büchner, Peter Weiss und Heiner Müller." The Germanic Review: Literature, Culture, Theory 77, no. 2 (2002): 117-127.
- "Mimetic Rationality: Adorno's Project of a Language of Philosophy." New German Critique 36, no. 3 (2009): 85-108.
- "War and Novel: Alfred Döblin’s “Wallenstein” and “November 1918”." In War, Violence and the Modern Condition, pp. 290-299. De Gruyter, 2010.
- "Kritische Theorie und Realismusbegriff: Horkheimer, Adorno, Kluge." In Realitätskonzepte in der Moderne, pp. 229–246. Brill Fink, 2011.
- "Danton’s Tod: Eine Relektüre." In Commitment and Compassion, pp. 47–63. Brill, 2012.
- "Taubenfüße und Adlerkrallen." Friedrich Nietzsches Sprach-und Stilkonzeption “in: Taubenfuße und Adlerkrallen. Essays zu Nietzsche, Adorno, Kluge, Buchner und Grabbe. Bielefeld: Aisthesis (2016): 13-34.
- "Beobachtungen zu Georg Simmels Schreibszene, Schreibfeld und zu späten Schriften." The Germanic Review: Literature, Culture, Theory 94, no. 2 (2019): 79-92.
