= The German Quarterly =

- Discipline: German studies
- Language: English
- Edited by: Muriel Cormican and Jen William

Publication details
- History: 1928–present
- Publisher: Wiley-Blackwell on behalf of the American Association of Teachers of German (United States)
- Frequency: Quarterly

Standard abbreviations
- ISO 4: Ger. Q.

Indexing
- ISSN: 0016-8831 (print); 1756-1183 (web)
- JSTOR: 00168831
- OCLC no.: 1258410

Links
- Journal homepage; Online access; Online archive

The German Quarterly is a quarterly peer-reviewed academic journal published by Wiley-Blackwell on behalf of the American Association of Teachers of German dedicated to German studies. The coeditors-in-chief are Muriel Cormican (Texas Christian University) and Jen William (Purdue University). The book review editor is Gary Schmidt (Wright State University). Established in 1928, it is published under the auspices of the American Association of Teachers of German. It has been called "one of the most widely and internationally read American journals in the field of German studies."

Beginning in 2023, The German Quarterly became available online only.

== Abstracting and indexing ==
The journal is abstracted and indexed in:

- Arts & Humanities Citation Index
- Current Contents/Arts & Humanities
- Education Index/Abstracts
- Expanded Academic ASAP
- International Bibliographies of Periodical Literature
- InfoTrac
- Linguistics & Language Behavior Abstracts
- MLA International Bibliography
- ProQuest databases
- RILM Abstracts of Music Literature
