= Joseph P. Bauke =

German academic

Joseph P. Bauke (May 18, 1931 – December 6, 1983) was an academic specializing in German literature and served as chairman of the German Department at Columbia University, editor-in-chief of The Germanic Review, and president of the Germanistic Society of America.

== Life and career ==
Joseph Padur Bauke was born in 1931 in Briesen, Germany, and grew up with one brother and three sisters. He moved to Cincinnati, Ohio, in the early 1950s and completed a B.A. at the University of Cincinnati in 1956 and an M.A. at the same institution the following year. He moved to New York to earn his Ph.D. at Columbia University in 1963. His dissertation was titled "Christian Gottfried Körner: Portrait of a Literary Man".

Bauke started to teach at Columbia in 1959 and served as the chair of the German Department for twelve years. He was one of only two tenured professors at the German Department at that time. Bauke taught at Columbia for a total of 24 years.

Bauke served as the primary editor for The Germanic Review from 1966 to 1983 and was the president of the Germanistic Society of America from 1970 to 1983.

Bauke specialized in German literature from the 18th to 20th centuries. His class on German lyric poetry was among the most popular at Columbia University. For his teaching, Bauke received the Mark Van Doren Award in 1976. Bauke was also the director of the Deutsches Haus (German House) at Columbia University.

Bauke's health began to deteriorate in the last year of his life. He died of a heart attack on December 6, 1983, aged 52. He was survived by his mother and siblings.
