= Mysterium Magnum =

Mysterium Magnum is Latin for "great mystery" and has several different associations and usages.

== Paracelsus ==
Paracelsus and other alchemists employed the term "Mysterium Magnum" to denote primordial undifferentiated matter, from which all the Classical Elements sprang, sometimes compared with Brahman, aether and akasha.

== Jakob Böhme ==
Jakob Böhme (1575–November 17, 1624) a German Christian mystic wrote a treatise entitled The Mysterium Magnum (1623).

== Sacrament ==
"Mysterium Magnum" is often employed in Christian theology as a euphemism for "sacrament".

== See also ==
- Eucharist
- Great Rite
- Hieros gamos
- Mystery religion
- O magnum mysterium
- Philosopher's stone
- Sacred Mysteries
- Wakan Tanka
