= The Germanic Review =

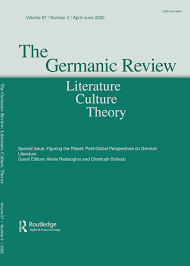
- Discipline: German studies
- Language: English, German
- Edited by: Oliver Simons

Publication details
- History: 1926–present
- Publisher: Routledge
- Frequency: Quarterly
- Open access: Hybrid

Standard abbreviations
- ISO 4: Ger. Rev.

Indexing
- ISSN: 0016-8890 (print); 1930-6962 (web)
- LCCN: 2006212179
- OCLC no.: 60624209

Links
- Journal homepage; Online access; Online archive

The Germanic Review: Literature, Culture, Theory is a quarterly peer-reviewed academic journal published by Routledge covering German studies, including German literature and culture, as well as German authors, intellectuals, and artists. The editor-in-chief is Oliver Simons (Columbia University). The journal was established in 1926 by Robert Herndon Fife (Columbia University) and originally published by the Columbia University Press. Later it was published by Heldref Publishers until that company was acquired by Taylor & Francis in 2009, which published the journal under its Routledge imprint.

== Editors-in-chief ==
The following persons are or have been editor-in-chief:

- Robert Herndon Fife, Jr. (1926-1946)
- André von Gronicka (1947-1977)
- Henry Caraway Hatfield (1947-1953)
- Carl Frank Bayerschmidt (1948-1977)
- Helen Meredith Mustard (1949-1969)
- Joseph Padur Bauke (1966–1983)
- Inge D. Halpert (1984–1997)
- Harro Müller (1997–2002)
- Shelley Frisch (2003–2005)
- Julia Hell (2006–2014)
- Johannes von Moltke (2006–2014)
- Andreas Gailus (2008–2014)
- Willi Goetschel
- Oliver Simons

== Abstracting and indexing ==
The journal is abstracted and indexed in:

- Arts and Humanities Citation Index
- Current Contents/Arts & Humanities
- EBSCO databases
- L'Année philologique
- Modern Language Association Database
- ProQuest databases
- Scopus
