= Delta Phi Alpha =

American German studies honor society

- ΔΦΑ
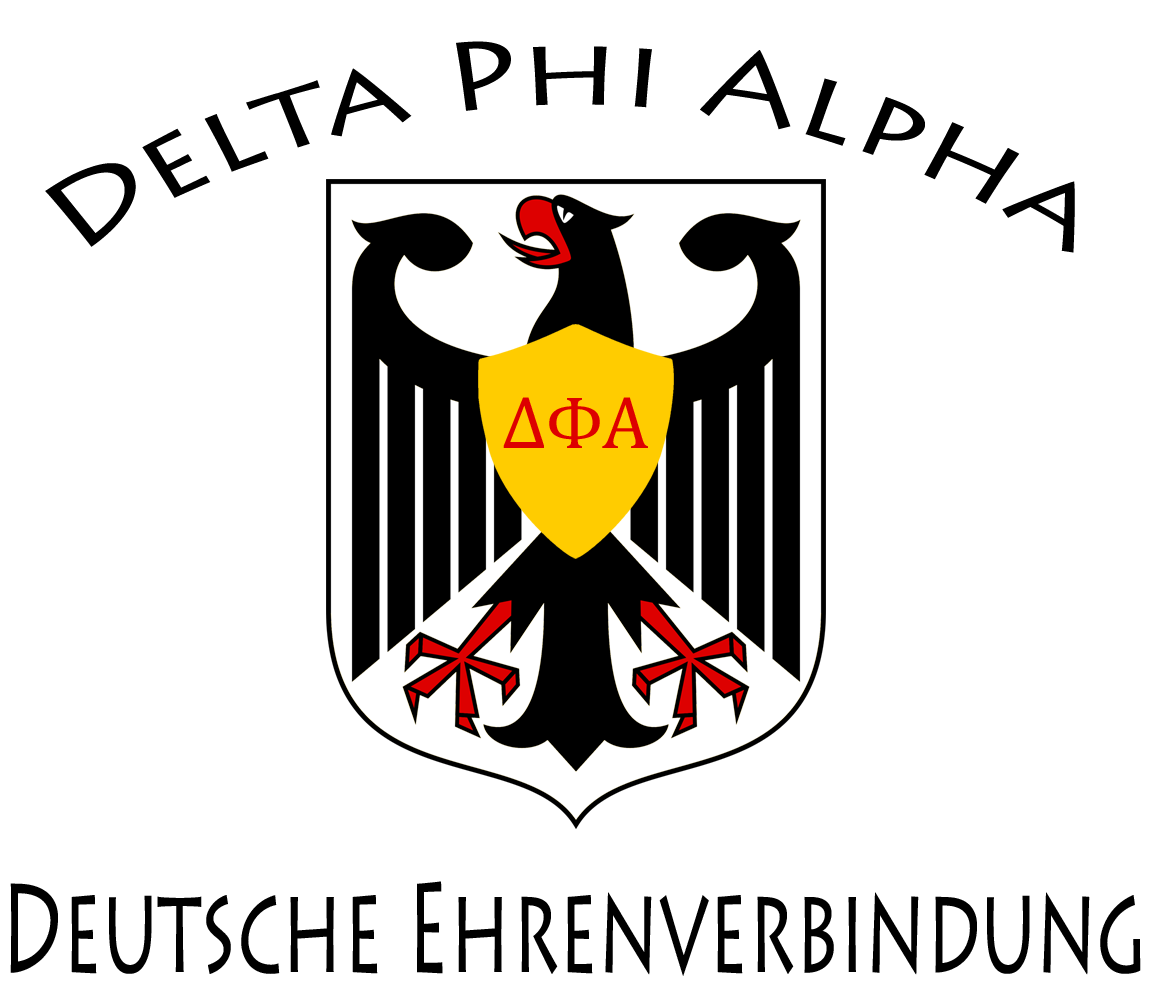
- Founded: May 27, 1929; 97 years ago Wofford College
- Type: Honor
- Affiliation: Independent
- Status: Active
- Emphasis: German studies
- Scope: National (US)
- Motto: "Torchbearer of Human Spirit"
- Colors: Black, Red Gold
- Symbol: Weimar Eagle
- Chapters: 300+
- Members: 31,000+ active
- Headquarters: 60 South Lincoln Street; Washington, Pennsylvania 15301; United States
- Website: www.aatg.org/delta-phi-alpha/

Delta Phi Alpha National German Honor Society (ΔΦΑ) (German: Deutsche Ehrenverbindung) is an American collegiate honor society for German studies. Delta Phi Alpha was founded on May 27, 1929, at Wofford College in Spartanburg, South Carolina. The society has chartered over three hundred chapters at colleges and universities in the United States.

== History ==
Delta Phi Alpha was established by James A. Chiles and John Olin Eidson at Wofford College in Spartenburg, South Carolina. Chiles, a professor of modern languages, met with 21 students in Old Main in February 1928 to establish a German club they named Deutscher Verein. Over the next year, student Eidson contacted German clubs at other small colleges to see if they were interested in forming a national society.

This led to the formation of Delta Phi Alpha honorary society on May 27, 1929. Chiles became its president, a position he held for the rest of his career. Three chapters formed in 1929: Alpha at Wofford, Beta at Central Methodist College, and Gamma at Bates College.

Delta Phi Alpha encourages the study and understanding of the German civilization, language, and literature. It recognizes excellence in academics and scholarship amongst students who study German.

The society adopted its constitution on March 1, 1932. In its first nine years, Delta Phi Alpha chartered 40 chapters across the United States. It published the Delta Phi Alpha Bulletin annually.

As of 2022, Delta Phi Alpha has 31,000 living members. It operates from Washington & Jefferson College in Washington, Pennsylvania.

== Symbols ==
The name Delta Phi Alpha was chosen to represent Deutscher Verein Amerika. The society's colors are black, red, and gold. Its coat of arms includes these three colors. The Delta Phi Alpha shield depicts an eagle in gold on a black background; here is a red shield on the eagle's chest with the Greek letters ΔΦΑ.

The society's symbol is the Weimar Eagle from the Coat of arms of Germany. Its slogan is "Fackelträger des menschlichen Geistes" or "Torchbearer of Human Spirit".

== Membership ==
Membership is open to students of all genders have an interest in German language or literature. Students are eligible for membership if they have completed two years coursework in college or university German, with at least a 3.3 GPA in those courses. In addition, potential members must have at least a 2.75 GPA overall. The society also awards honorary membership to non-students who have made significant cultural, literary, or scholastic achievements in the German language or culture. Faculty who teach German at chapter institutions can also join.

== Governance ==
The society is managed by a National Council consisting of five officers: a national president, first vice president, second vice president, a secretary, and a treasurer.

== Chapters ==
The society had chartered over three hundred chapters. As of 2024, it has 234 active chapters.
