= American Association of Teachers of German =

Professional organization for teachers of German in the United States and Europe

The American Association of Teachers of German is a professional organization for teachers of German in the United States and Europe. Teachers may be involved in primary, secondary, or university education. Additionally, retired and student teachers are welcome.

AATG sponsors the high school honor society, Delta Epsilon Phi. It was founded in Coral Gables, Florida, United States, in 1968, functioning as a branch of the AATG. AATG also sponsors the community college honor society Epsilon Phi Delta.

== AATG National German Exam ==
The National German Exam is administered each year to over 25,000 high school students of German. The exam provides individual diagnostic feedback, rewards students through an extensive regional and national prize program, and creates a sense of accomplishment. Exam results provide teachers a means of comparing students in all regions of the country, as well as programmatic data provided to help inform curricular decisions. The exam is administered in December and January and results are provided directly to teachers in February.

=== NGE Study Trip Award Scholarship ===
For over 50 years, the Federal Republic of Germany, through the German Foreign Office (Auswärtiges Amt) and its Pedagogical Exchange Service (Pädagogischer Austauschdienst), has provided the AATG/PAD Study Trip Awards, a 3-4 week trip to Germany in the summer following the Exam. Students attend classes at an academic high school, stay in homestays, and participate in various excursions to places of cultural significance. The initial selection process takes place through the AATG National German Exam: Those students who score at or above the 90th percentile and meet eligibility requirements are informed that they can apply for the Study Trip Award. Previously, two candidates were selected from each state by the AATG Chapter committee: Award 1, a sophomore or junior, and award 2, a senior. These candidates' applications are then sent to the National AATG Selection Committee, which makes the final decisions. For the first time in the 2021-2022 school year, group placement was determined by the results of AVANT Stamp Tests administered free of charge to students who advanced to the National Selection Round. Eight of these students were selected to be a part of the International Prizewinner Group, which attends an International Seminar with 450 participants from around 90 countries. while 48 others earned a three-week trip.

== AATG Endowed Scholarship ==
Each year up to four recipients of this scholarship are selected from the applicants for the National German Exam Study Trip Award. Endowed Scholarship recipients receive a full scholarship to participate in the AATG Summer Study Program. This scholarship has existed since 1997 and is funded by generous donations of AATG Members and friends.

== AATG run honor societies ==
AATG runs honor societies at the following levels:

- Delta Phi Alpha - University
- Epsilon Phi Delta - Community College
- Delta Epsilon Phi - High School and High School equivalent
- Junior Delta Epsilon Phi - Middle School / Junior High School or equivalent

== See also ==
- American Council on the Teaching of Foreign Languages
- American Association of Teachers of French
- German American Partnership Program
