= George Hill Mathewson Lawrence =

American botanist (1910–1978)

- Born: June 19, 1910; East Greenwich, Rhode Island
- Died: June 10, 1978 (aged 67); East Greenwich
- Education: Lockwood High School
- Alma mater: University of Rhode Island, Cornell University
- Known for: Taxonomy; Botany
- Spouse: Miriam Boothby
- Awards: honorary Doctor of Science degree (1952), Foreign Honorary Fellow of the Botanical Society of Edinburgh
- Scientific career
- Fields: Botany
- Workplaces: Cornell University; University of Miami
- Academic advisors: Liberty Hyde Bailey
- Author abbrev. (botany): G.H.M.Lawr.

George Hill Mathewson Lawrence (June 19, 1910 – June 10, 1978) was an American botanist, writer and professor of botany who helped establish the 'Liberty Hyde Bailey Hortorium', the Hunt Botanical Library and the Huntia journal. He was also an avid book collector, including books on the history of Rhode Island, historic books and botanical art.

== Biography ==
George Hill Mathewson Lawrence was born in East Greenwich, Rhode Island on June 19, 1910. His parents were Dana Lawrence, and Anna (Mathewson) Lawrence (or Anna M. Mathewson).

He attended and graduated from Lockwood High School (formerly the James T. Lockwood High School,) in Warwick in 1928. He then attended Rhode Island State College, and achieved a Bachelor of Science degree in 1932 and then Master of Science degree in 1933.

In 1934, he married Miriam Boothby of Westbrook, Maine.

He was superintendent of greenhouses and grounds at Rhode Island State Hospital between 1934 and 1936.

Lawrence left Rhode Island to study for his doctorate at Cornell University, (in Ithaca, New York,).

Lawrence was also a dedicated plant taxonomist and had studied Armeria (commonly known as Sea pinks), in addition to other plants.

At Cornell, he became a student of the renowned botanist/ horticulturalist Liberty Hyde Bailey, he then received his Doctor of Philosophy degree in botany in 1939. Previously in 1935, Liberty Bailey had given his herbarium (consisting of 125,000 sheets), a building and his library of books (consisting of over 3,000 books) to Cornell University. This became the basis for the 'Liberty Hyde Bailey Hortorium'. Bailey was its unsalaried director, his daughter Ethel Bailey was the curator.

After receiving the doctorate, Lawrence remained as Bailey's assistant in the Bailey Hortorium (within the university) until World War II started in 1943. He then enlisted in the US Navy.

After the war, in 1946, Lawrence returned to Cornell and the Bailey Hortorium becoming a professor of botany.

On 1 December 1949, Lawrence also helped to prepare the revised edition of Manual of Cultivated Plants with Liberty Hyde Bailey.

When Bailey retired in 1951, Lawrence was named Director of the Liberty Hyde Bailey Hortorium, and in that same year, he published his seminal botany textbook, 'Taxonomy of Vascular Plants'. It is still a standard text for students of systematic botany. It was reprinted in 2012.

During the mid-1950s. Lawrence travelled to England. While he was away, he kept a close correspondence with Dr. Bailey and the Hortorium staff. These letters are among the Lawrence Papers stored in 'Special Collections' at Cornell.

In 1952, Lawrence also received an honorary Doctor of Science degree from Rhode Island State College (then the University of Rhode Island).

In 1954, he assumed the editorship of the Bailey Hortorium journal, Baileya, a quarterly journal of horticultural taxonomy. He also he wrote "Liberty Hyde Bailey (1858–1954); An Appreciation" in 'Baileya' Vol.3 Issue 1, page 26–40 in 1954.

In 1954, he was given a Guggenheim Fellowship Award, in the field of Plant Sciences.

In 1954, Lawrence also managed the transition of the Bailey Hortorium from its previous home at Sage Place to its new facilities in Mann Library. It provided the Hortorium with a centrally located space on the university campus.

Lawrence was also in correspondence with botanist and plant explorer David Fairchild (1869–1954) and the American philanthropist, Barbour Lathrop (1847–1927). Lawrence had contributed many articles to the Hortorium's journals, 'Baileya' and 'Gentes Herbarum'. Including; Lawrence, G.H.M. 1956. The Bailey Hortorium, its past and present. Baileya 4(1):1–9. Also published and described Lapeirousia denticulata (Lam.) G.H.M.Lawr. in Baileya 3: 134 in 1955. Which is now classed as a synonym of Lapeirousia fabricii subsp. fabricii.

In 1955, Lawrence was also the author of another standard textbook on botany: 'Introduction to Plant Taxonomy',Macmillan, 179 pages.

In 1960, Lawrence left the Bailey Hortorium, (after 21 years of being a student and teacher) to assume the position of director of the newly established Rachel McMasters Miller Hunt Botanical Library at the then Carnegie Institute of Technology, Pennsylvania, (now Carnegie Mellon University). With the collection of Rachel McMasters Miller Hunt (of the American Aluminum Company (Alcoa) Hunts) as its major cornerstone, Lawrence started developing the Hunt Botanical Library.

One of his major accomplishments as director, was the acquisition for the library of a 4000 item collection of Linnaeus materials from the private library of Dr. Birger Strandell of Sweden, who was a direct descendant of Carl Linnaeus. In the ten years after its acquisition, the Linnaeana collection had doubled in size.

On 7 December 1963, he presented a paper at a symposium held at the William Andrews Clark Memorial Library, in L.A., titled 'Herbals, their history and significance'.

He was editor of 'Adanson; the bicentennial of Michel Adanson's Families de plantes', published by Hunt Botanical Library, between 1963 and 1964, produced in 2 volumes.

In 1964, Lawrence established Huntia, the institute's scholarly journal of botanical history. The journal was published irregularly in one or more numbers per volume of approximately 200 pages by Hunt Institute. Volumes 1 to 7, was issued in 14 volumes, large octavo (folded paper) they were paperback apart from Volume 2 which was clothbound. Then in 'Huntia' Vol.1, pages 162–165 in 1964, Lawrence wrote an article, The botanical significance of letters and manuscripts.

In 1968, "Botanico-Periodicum-Huntianum" was also published by George H. M. Lawrence and others as editors. Pittsburgh, Pa., Hunt Botanical Library.

Lawrence had become 'director emeritus' of the Bailey Hortorium before he retired in 1970, this was due in part to ill health.

In 1971, Lawrence also taught tropical botany at the University of Miami in Coral Gables, Florida.

Lawrence then returned to his native Rhode Island but he remained on the staff of the Hunt Botanical as a Research Associate and Consultant, however, in order to complete an annotated catalogue of its Linnaeus collection. Working with the donor of the collection, Dr. Birger Strandell, Lawrence devoted the remaining seven and one half years of his life to the completion of the Linnaeus Catalogue. Due to many problems, including several with its computer generated format, the Catalogue was never completed and is still being worked on. The Strandell Collection was open in 1976 to view, as completed by director Gilbert S. Daniels, who published papers in Taxon (journal) in 1976.

Lawrence was also a student of local history and an avid bibliophile and collector of rare books.

Lawrence was a member of the URI (University of Rhode Island) Century Club and a trustee of the URI Foundation and Chairman of the Foundation's Campus Beautification Committee. In 1977, he had compiled a pamphlet detailing statistics and accomplishments of the class of 1934 for its 45th reunion.

Lawrence was named a fellow of the Linnean Society of London in May 1978.

George Lawrence died in Kent County Memorial Hospital in Warwick, R.I., at the age of 67. on 10 June 1978, not long after returning from a trip to London and Uppsala in connection with the Linnean bicentennial commemorations, on the 200th anniversary of the death of Linnaeus.

He was survived in 1978 by his wife, Miriam, a son, a daughter, a brother, sister and seven grandchildren.

He had gathered a large library of botanical works, general rare books, and books of Rhode Island history stored at his East Greenwich home. Many of these books, in particular those on Rhode Island history, were donated to the University of Rhode Island Library by his widow, Miriam Lawrence. This donation broadened both the Library's Rhode Island Collection and its rare book collection.

The bulk of his professional papers are housed in the Archives of the Hunt Institute for Botanical Documentation (formerly the Hunt Botanical Library) at Carnegie Mellon University in Pittsburgh and also at the Liberty Hyde Bailey Hortorium at Cornell University in Ithaca, New York.

He was a Foreign Honorary Fellow of the Botanical Society of Edinburgh. and he was a member of the American Horticultural Society, Garden History Society, the Massachusetts Horticultural Society, the Pennsylvania Horticultural Society, and the Planting Fields Foundation, New York.

== Bibliography ==
Books that he wrote include;

- George Hill Mathewson Lawrence, 1953, 'A Reclassification of the Genus Iris'.
- George Hill Mathewson Lawrence (editor), 1953, 'Major Groups Within the Genus Iris'.
- "The Night Before Christmas" An Exhibition Catalogue Compiled by George H. M. Lawrence. Foreword by Anne Lyon Haight, Pittsburgh PA: The Pittsburgh Bibliophiles, 1964.

== Legacy ==
The George H.M. Lawrence Memorial Award

It commemorated the life and achievements of Dr. George H. M. Lawrence (1910–1978), founding director of Hunt Institute. From its inception in 1979 to its ending in 2020, the annual (semi-annual from 1988 to 2000) award in the amount of $2,000 was made to outstanding doctoral candidates with travel costs in support of dissertation research in systematic botany or horticulture or the history of the plant sciences, including literature and exploration. The Lawrence Memorial Fund Award Committee, which included representatives from Hunt Institute, The Hunt Foundation, the Lawrence family and the botanical community, selected recipients from candidates nominated by their major professors. The award was presented at the annual banquet of the Botanical Society of America.

=== Award recipients ===
1979 – 2020:

- 1979 – Michael J. Balick, Ph.D., Harvard University, 1980, Director and Philecology Curator, Institute of Economic Botany, New York Botanical Garden
- 1980 – James M. Affolter, Ph.D., University of Michigan, 1983, Director of Research, The State Botanical Garden of Georgia; professor, Department of Horticulture, University of Georgia
- 1981 – The Lawrence Award was not presented.
- 1982 – Janet R. Sullivan, Ph.D., University of Oklahoma, 1984, Adjunct Associate Professor, Department of Biological Sciences and Collection Manager, Hodgdon Herbarium, University of New Hampshire
- 1983 – Raymond B. Cranfill, Ph.D., University of California, Berkeley, 2001
- 1984 – Mark W. Chase, Ph.D., University of Michigan, 1985, Director, Jodrell Laboratory, Royal Botanic Gardens, Kew
- 1985 – George E. Schatz, Ph.D., University of Wisconsin-Madison, 1987, Curator, Africa and Madagascar Department, Missouri Botanical Garden; adjunct professor, University of Missouri, St. Louis
- 1986 – Andrew J. Henderson, Ph.D., City University of New York, 1987, Curator, Institute of Systematic Botany, New York Botanical Garden
- 1987 – John V. Freudenstein, Ph.D., Cornell University, 1992, Director, Herbarium, Museum of Biological Diversity, Ohio State University
- 1988 – Clayton J. Antieau, Ph.D., University of Washington, 1987, Senior Wetland Ecologist and Botanist, Washington State Department of Transportation
- 1989 – The Lawrence Award was not presented.
- 1990 – Chester E. Wilson, State University of New York at Stony Brook, a student of James Thomson, Mr. Wilson has undertaken a study of secondary sex characteristics in dioecious species of Polytrichaceae. The proceeds of the award will help support his travel in the U.S. and Europe for herbarium research.
- 1991 – The Lawrence Award was not presented.
- 1992 – J. Travis Columbus, Ph.D., University of California, Berkeley, 1996, Research Scientist, Rancho Santa Ana Botanic Garden, Claremont, California and Professor of Botany, Claremont Graduate University
- 1993 – The Lawrence Award was not presented.
- 1994 – Kathleen M. Pryer, Ph.D., Duke University, 1995, professor, Biology Department, Duke University
- 1996 – Amy J. Litt, Ph.D., City University of New York, 1999
- 1997 – The Lawrence Award was not presented.
- 1998 – J. Chris Pires, Ph.D., University of Wisconsin, Madison, 2000, Associate Professor of Biological Sciences, University of Missouri, Columbia
- 1999 – The Lawrence Award was not presented.
- 2000 – Anne Katherine Hansen, University of Texas at Austin, a student of Professor Robert K. Jansen, for her dissertation research, Ms. Hansen has undertaken a study of the genus Passiflora with a special emphasis on the large group of species with a basic chromosome number of 9. The proceeds of the Award will help support her travel in Brazil for field research.
- 2001 – The Lawrence Award was not presented.
- 2002 – Andrew L. Hipp, University of Wisconsin Madison, a student of Paul E. Berry, Mr. Hipp has undertaken a phylogenetic and taxonomic study of Carex section Ovales. He will use the proceeds of the Award to support his field studies of the Carex microptera complex.
- 2003 – Sarah E. Edwards, Ph.D., University of London, 2006, Data Services Officer: Medicinal Plant Names Services, Biodiversity Informatics and Spatial Analysis, Royal Botanic Gardens, Kew
- 2004 – Danica T. Harbaugh, Ph.D., University of California, Berkeley, 2007, Research Scientist, university and Jepson Herbarium, University of California, Berkeley
- 2005 – Ricarda Riina, Ph.D., University of Wisconsin—Madison, 2006, Researcher, Real Jardín Botánico de Madrid
- 2006 – Eric Schuettplez, Ph.D., a student of Dr. Kathleen M. Pryer at Duke University, 2007. For his dissertation research, Mr. Schuettpelzhas undertaken a study of understanding the origin of diversification of fern epiphytes.
- 2007 – Mr. Jimmy K. Triplett, Ph.D., a student of Dr. Lynn G. Clark at Iowa State University, 2008. For his dissertation research, Mr. Triplett has undertaken study of woody bamboo genus Pleioblastus. Later, assistant professor and Herbarium Curator, Department of Biology, Jacksonville State University
- 2008 – Mr. Dylan O. Burge, a student of Professor Paul Manos at Duke University. The proceeds of the award will help support his travel for field and collections-based work in an integrative research study of the genus Ceanothus.
- 2009 – The Lawrence Award was not presented.
- 2010 – Ms. Christine D. Bacon, a student of Professor Mark P. Simmons at Colorado State University, 2011. The proceeds of the award will help support her travel for field and collections-based work in an integrative research study of the genus Pritchardia. Postdoctoral researcher, University of Gothenburg, Sweden
- 2011 – Mr. Brian Sidoti, student of Dr. Kenneth Cameron of the University of Wisconsin, 2015. Adjunct Professor, Natural Sciences, State College of Florida, Manatee-Sarasota
- 2012 – The Lawrence Award was not presented.
- 2013 – Aleksandar Radosavljevic, student of Dr. Patrick Herendeen of the Chicago Botanical Garden and Northwestern University. The proceeds of the award will help support his travel for field and collections-based work in integrative research study of the genus Cynometra.
- 2014 – The Lawrence Award was not presented.
- 2015 – Keir Wefferling, Ph.D., University of Wisconsin—Milwaukee, 2018, Postdoctoral researcher, University of California, Berkeley
- 2016 – Andre Hahn, Ph.D., Oregon State University, 2018.

The Lawrence Award was not presented in 2017, 2018, 2019 and 2020.

== Other sources ==
- Biogr. details incl. portr. in Rheedea, 20(1): 28 (2010)
