= Henrietta C. Bartlett =

American literary scholar

- Born: Henrietta Collins Bartlett; July 8, 1873; Old Lyme, Connecticut, U.S.
- Died: September 14, 1963 (aged 90); New Haven, Connecticut
- Known for: Census of Shakespeare's Plays in Quarto

Academic background
- Education: Pratt Institute

Academic work
- Discipline: Shakespeare; Bibliographer

Henrietta Collins Bartlett (July 8, 1873 – September 14, 1963) was an American bibliographer, Shakespeare scholar, and creator of the first modern census of Shakespeare's published drama. She has been called "one of the foremost bibliographers of her time," despite working in a scholarly field in which "the overwhelming majority has been male."

== Biography ==
Bartlett was born in 1873 in Old Lyme, Connecticut. Her mother, Anne Pierson Terry, was a member of the prominent New England Terry family, which included the major book collector Roderick Terry. Her father, Charles Griswold Bartlett, attended Yale University and received an MA in 1888; he later ran a school in Old Lyme, Black Hall School.

She had three siblings: a brother, Charles G. Bartlett, who attended Yale; another brother, Commander Harold “Harry” Bartlett, a Navy airman; and a sister, Sarah, who married John Payne and lived in New Mexico. Bartlett lived in New Haven and New York City for most of her life. She attended boarding school in New England, where she first met Ruth S. Granniss, librarian to the Grolier Club; the two were close friends throughout their lives. Bartlett possibly spent some time as a schoolteacher in the late 1890s and early 1900s, when she is listed as living at the Robert Bartlett School in New London, Connecticut.

In 1900, she enrolled in library school at the Pratt Institute in New York City. Her early work in the field was as a private librarian and cataloguer to Beverly Chew and William A. White, major collectors of their day. In this capacity, Bartlett could examine first-hand copies of most of the early editions of Shakespeare and contemporary writers, which prepared her to write the Census that is her greatest legacy.

Like most bibliophile clubs, the Grolier did not allow women members, and so like Granniss, Bartlett became a member of the Hroswitha Club, the major women's bibliophile club. She remained actively involved in the New York City bibliophilic community throughout her life, where she was known not only as a bibliographer but also as a curator of public exhibits, including a major exhibit on Shakespeare at the New York Public Library in 1916.

In the 1920s and 1930s, Bartlett gave lectures in the bibliography at Yale, at a time when university courses in the bibliography were rare in the United States. Bartlett herself noted that there were “no regular lectures on these subjects except in some of the large colleges and those very recent.” Subjects included textual editing, cataloguing, collecting, provenance, and the history of printing, as well as lectures on a range of topics and authors in English literature: Shakespeare, seventeenth-century poetry, English prose fiction, and Alexander Pope. She also led private courses for women in her home.

Bartlett spent her retirement living in Old Lyme, although she maintained a lively correspondence on bibliographic matters with a wide range of colleagues at Yale and elsewhere. She died in 1963, aged 90, and is buried in Old Lyme's Griswold Cemetery.

== Census of Shakespeare's Plays in Quarto ==
In 1913, Bartlett was commissioned by the Elizabethan Club to co-edit the 1916 Census of Shakespeare's Plays in Quarto with the British bibliographer Alfred W. Pollard. Bartlett negotiated with the Club to be paid for her work, explaining that she was "obliged to work for my bread and cheese[.]"

Bartlett and Pollard's Census was the first attempt to locate and catalogue systematically all extant copies of Shakespeare quartos before 1709. The project relied on the existing expertise of Bartlett and Pollard, but it also incorporated bibliographic data from many libraries, universities, booksellers, and private collectors; Bartlett later noted that she had sent out over 400 letters requesting information in the lead-up to publication in 1916. Bartlett continued to revise and expand the existing data, and (without Pollard) she compiled a new and more complete edition of the Census in 1939. The Census provides a wealth of information on the provenance, condition, binding, and size of each copy.

The Census has been expanded and updated in an online version, the Shakespeare Census, which acknowledges that it is "modelled on and extends the groundbreaking bibliographic work of Henrietta C. Bartlett." The Shakespeare Census includes numerous additional copies of the plays that Bartlett catalogued, which were unknown to her in 1939, and also catalogues copies of a number of Shakespearean and pseudo-Shakespearean works not in her Census, including Pericles, the Sonnets, Venus and Adonis, The Rape of Lucrece, and others.

== Scholarly reputation ==
Especially following the publication of the Census in 1916, Bartlett was widely regarded as a "bibliographer of distinction." The Census was favorably reviewed in a range of publications and Bartlett received letters of thanks from major scholars and collectors in the field. In the ensuing years, she published prolifically on the early texts of Shakespeare’s plays and was frequently asked to give public lectures. Still, she recognized that—without a traditional academic background—her legitimacy within the field of Shakespeare studies might still be questioned. As she wrote wryly to a colleague in 1916: "I speak at U[niversity] of P[ennsylvania] April 12th on 'Shakespeare Folios and Quartos' and Prof. Schelling is sadly asking if I have any academic degrees! Alas, I never heard of a degree and am merely a humble person who happens to know something about Shakespeare."

All of the major Shakespeare collectors of the day corresponded with Bartlett, often seeking her advice on their copies. She sorted out the proper ordering of the preliminary material in the First Folio for Carl Pforzheimer, for instance, noting that she had typed her letter to him herself "as I am afraid of mistakes of importance if I have it copied, unfortunately I am not as good a typist as a bibliographer, hence the erasures." Her papers, now at the Beinecke Library, include correspondence with important contemporary bibliographic scholars, collectors, and book dealers, including Henry Folger, Henry Huntington, Mary Hyde, R.B. McKerrow, Seymour de Ricci, Hyder Rollins, just to name a few.

Often her work went less acknowledged than that of her male collaborators. The Book Collector's Guide (1921) was credited to de Ricci alone, even though de Ricci himself noted: “Miss Henrietta C. Bartlett, whose share in my labours has been so considerable that in all fair justice her name should have appeared on the title page. Not only did she continually assist me in the collection of data, the preparation of the copy, and the arduous reading of the proofs, but her accurate mind and well-balanced judgment have done more than I am able to express towards making this Guide acceptable to the public and useful to the general reader.”

== Works ==
- A garland of poppies gathered by Ruth S. Granniss and Henrietta C. Bartlett., 1905.
- A catalogue of the David N. Carvalho collection of incunabula, consisting of a sequence of dated books 1470-1499, together with a number of sixteenth century books, 1911.
- Hand-list of early English books, mostly of the Elizabethan period, collected by W. A. White, Brooklyn, N.Y., 1914.
- A census of Shakespeare's plays in quarto, 1594-1709, with Alfred W. Pollard, 1916.
- Exhibition of Shakespeariana, April 2-May 31, New York Public Library, 1916.
- Genealogical records: Manuscript entries of births, deaths and marriages, taken from family Bibles, 1581-1917, with Jeannie F-J. Robison, 1917.
- The Library of the late Theodore Low De Vinne, 1920
- The Book Collector's Guide: A Practical Handbook of British and American Bibliography, with Seymour de Ricci, 1921
- Mr. William Shakespeare, original and early editions of his quartos and folios; his source books and those containing contemporary notices, 1922.
- Extant autograph material by Shakespeare's fellow dramatists, 1929.
- First editions of Shakespeare's quartos, 1935.
- A census of Shakespeare's plays in quarto, 1594-1709, 1939.
- Verses, 1888-1912, 1949.
