= Baileya =

Baileya may refer to:

- Baileya (plant), a genus of desert marigolds
- Baileya (moth), a genus of moths
- Baileya (journal), the quarterly journal of horticultural taxonomy
