= Herbaceous plant =

Plant that has no persistent woody stem above ground

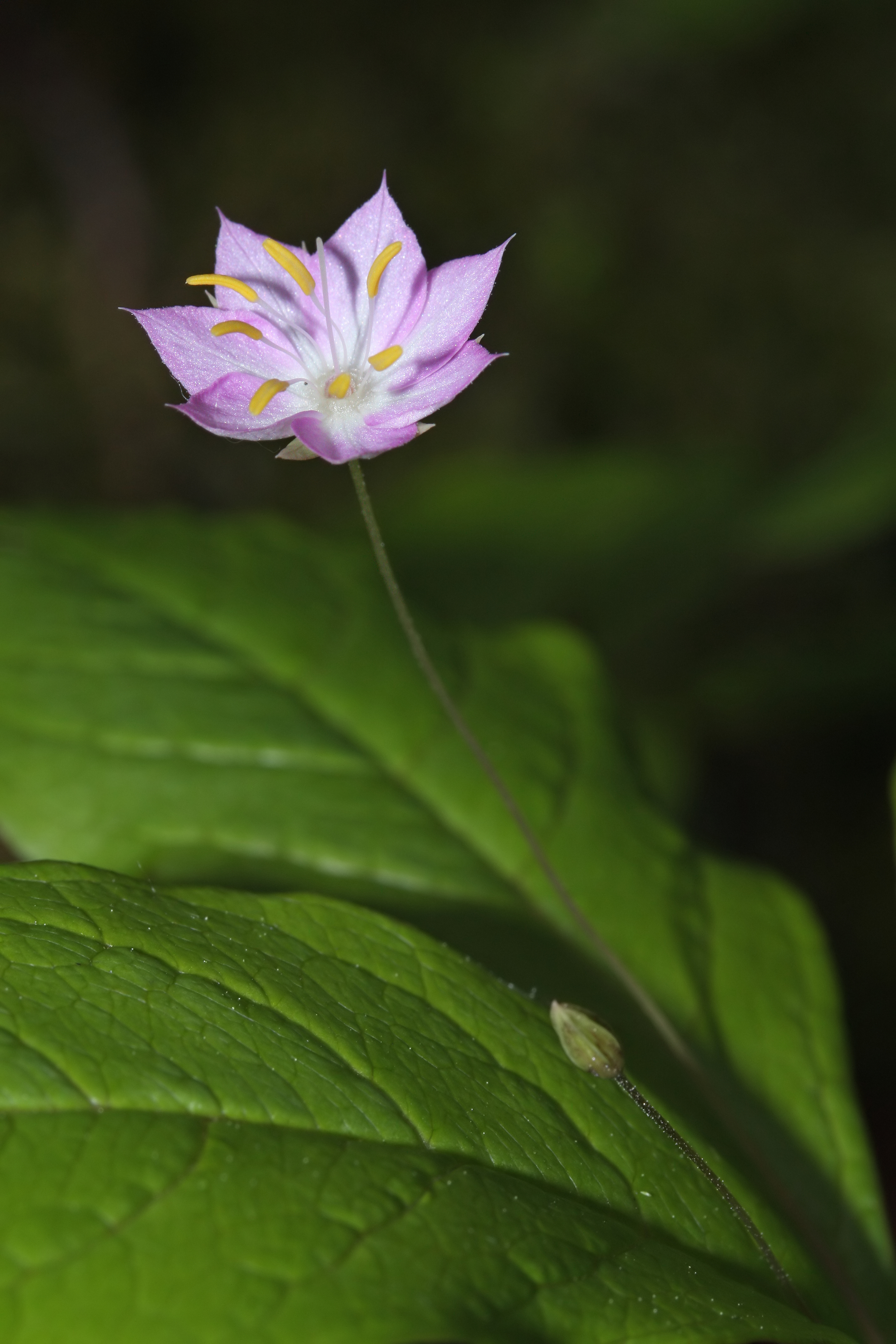
Lysimachia latifolia (broadleaf starflower) is a perennial herbaceous plant of the ground layer of forests in western North America.

Herbaceous plants are vascular plants that have no persistent woody stems above ground. This broad category of plants includes many perennials, and nearly all annuals and biennials.

== Definitions of "herb" and "herbaceous" ==
The fourth edition of the Shorter Oxford English Dictionary defines "herb" as:

1. "A plant whose stem does not become woody and persistent (as in a tree or shrub) but remains soft and succulent, and dies (completely or down to the root) after flowering";
2. "A (freq. aromatic) plant used for flavouring or scent, in medicine, etc.". (See: Herb)

The same dictionary defines "herbaceous" as:

1. "Of the nature of a herb; esp. not forming a woody stem but dying down to the root each year";
2. "BOTANY Resembling a leaf in colour or texture. Opp. scarious".

Botanical sources differ from each other on the definition of "herb". For instance, the Hunt Institute for Botanical Documentation includes the condition "when persisting over more than one growing season, the parts of the shoot dying back seasonally". Some orchids, such as species of Phalaenopsis, are described in some sources (including the authoritative Plants of the World Online) as "herbs" but with "leaves persistent or sometimes deciduous". In the glossary of Flora of the Sydney Region, Roger Charles Carolin defines "herb" as a "plant that does not produce a woody stem", and the adjective "herbaceous" as meaning "herb-like, referring to parts of the plant that are green and soft in texture".

== Description ==
Herbaceous plants include graminoids, forbs, and ferns. Forbs are generally defined as herbaceous broad-leafed plants, while graminoids are plants with grass-like appearance including true grasses, sedges, and rushes.

Herbaceous plants most often are low-growing plants, different from woody plants like trees and shrubs, tending to have softer green stems; their above-ground growth is ephemeral and often seasonal in duration. Lignin is present in herbaceous plants, including small, short lived herbs like Arabidopsis, but is generally in lesser quantity than in woody plants. By contrast, non-herbaceous vascular plants are woody plants that have lignified stems above ground that remain alive, even during any dormant season, and grow shoots the next year from the above-ground parts – these include trees, shrubs, vines and woody bamboos. Banana plants are also regarded as herbaceous plants because the stem does not contain true woody tissue.

Some herbaceous plants can grow rather large, such as the genus Musa, to which the banana belongs.

== Habit and habitat ==
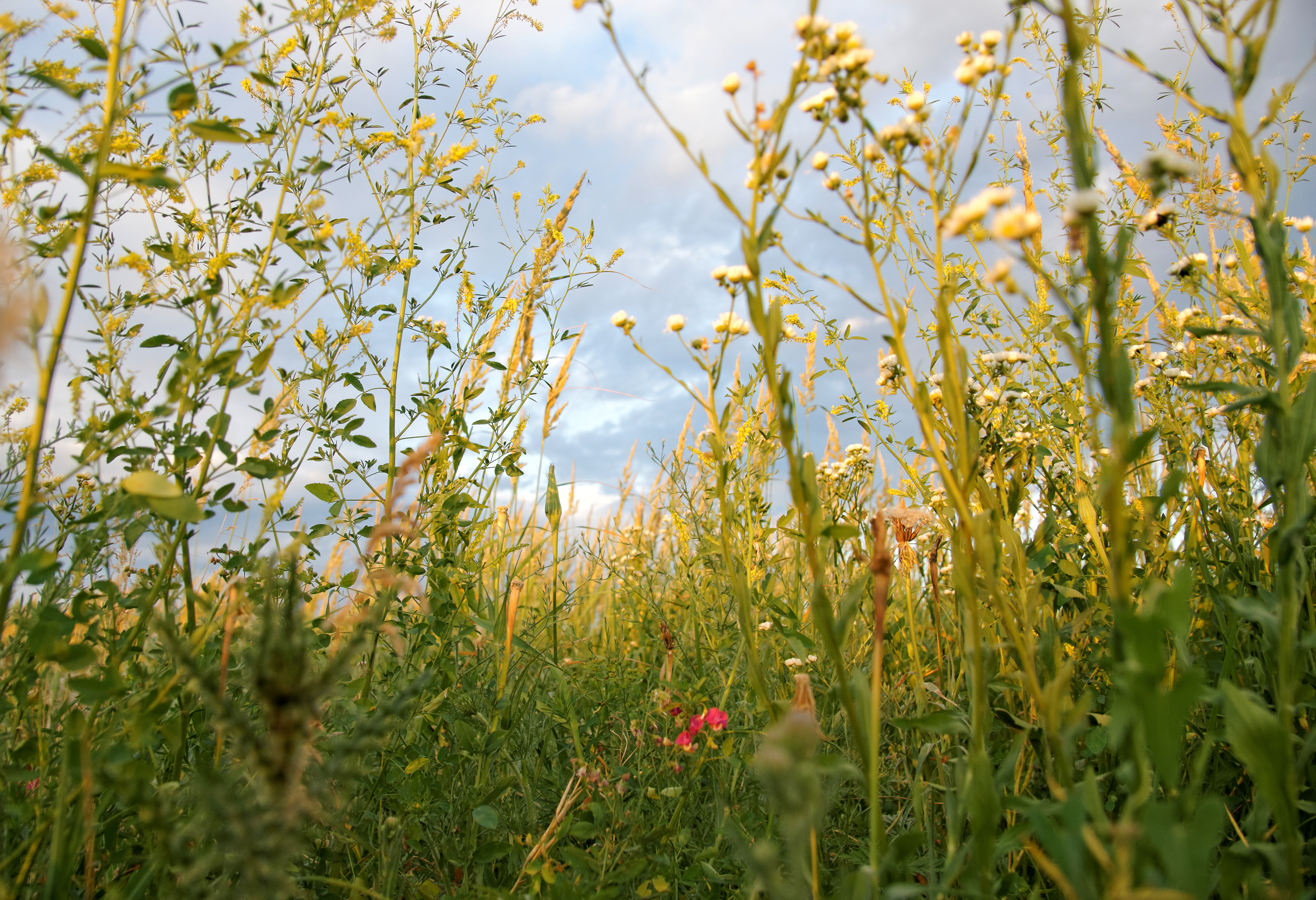
A wide variety of herbaceous Poaceae plants in a grassland

Some relatively fast-growing herbaceous plants (especially annuals) are pioneers, or early-successional species. Others form the main vegetation of many stable habitats, occurring for example in the ground layer of forests, or in naturally open habitats such as meadow, salt marsh or desert. Some habitats, like grasslands and prairies and savannas, are dominated by herbaceous plants along with aquatic environments like ponds, streams and lakes.

The age of some herbaceous perennial plants can be determined by herbchronology, the analysis of annual growth rings in the secondary root xylem.

Herbaceous plants do not produce perennializing above-ground structures using lignin, which is a complex phenolic polymer deposited in the secondary cell wall of all vascular plants. The development of lignin during vascular plant evolution provided mechanical strength, rigidity, and hydrophobicity to secondary cell walls creating a woody stem, allowing plants to grow tall and transport water and nutrients over longer distances within the plant body. Since most woody plants are perennials with a longer life cycle because it takes more time and more resources (nutrients and water) to produce persistently living lignified woody stems, they are not as able to colonize open and dry ground as rapidly as herbs.

The surface of herbs is a catalyst for dew, which in arid climates and seasons is the main type of precipitation and is necessary for the survival of vegetation, i.e. in arid areas, herbaceous plants are a generator of precipitation and the basis of an ecosystem. Most of the water vapor that turns into dew comes from the air, not the soil or clouds. The taller the herb (surface area is the main factor though), the more dew it produces, so a short cut of the herbs necessitates watering. For example, if you frequently and shortly cut the grass without watering in an arid zone, then desertification occurs.

== Types of herbaceous plants ==
Most herbaceous plants have a perennial (85%) life cycle but some are annual (15%) or biennial (<1%). Annual plants die completely at the end of the growing season or when they have flowered and fruited, and then new plants grow from seed. Herbaceous perennial and biennial plants may have stems that die at the end of the growing season, but parts of the plant survive under or close to the ground from season to season (for biennials, until the next growing season, when they grow and flower again, then die).

New growth can also develop from living tissues remaining on or under the ground, including roots, a caudex (a thickened portion of the stem at ground level) or various types of underground stems, such as bulbs, corms, stolons, rhizomes and tubers. Examples of herbaceous biennials include carrot, parsnip and common ragwort; herbaceous perennials include potato, peony, hosta, mint, most ferns and most grasses.
