= Frances Hooper =

American journalist

- Born: Frances Milliken Hooper; September 18, 1892; Chicago, Illinois
- Died: April 30, 1986 (aged 93); Kenilworth, Illinois
- Occupations: Journalist, advertising executive, collector of books and art
- Writing career
- Language: English

Frances Milliken Hooper (September 18, 1892, in Chicago, Illinois – April 30, 1986, in Kenilworth, Illinois) was a journalist, one of the first female advertising executives in the United States, founder and president of the Frances Hooper Advertising Agency.

== Early years and education ==
Hooper was born in 1892 in Chicago. Her parents were James Hooper and Mary (Milliken) Hooper. She attended the University of Chicago and Smith College in Massachusetts, where she obtained her degree in 1914.

== Career ==
Hooper worked as a features writer at the Chicago Herald before beginning work in advertising at Marshall Field's department store. In the 1920s, she founded the Frances Hooper Advertising Agency, serving as its president until 1961. She later remarked that her motivation for founding her own agency in the 1920s was job security.

Hooper was one of the first female advertising executives in the United States. Her agency produced campaigns for magazines such as Family Circle and Redbook, but her largest client was the Wrigley Company, into whose building she relocated in 1930. She maintained the Wrigley public service promotion accounts for over thirty years. Her office, with its modern art collection and contemporary furniture specifically designed for her office, were featured in newspapers of the period. Hooper was an art collector and had an extensive collection of books as well.

Hooper dedicated much of her career life to mentoring other women to achieve in the business world, a practice she believed was a responsibility for other women who achieved success. She was a co-founder of Kay's Animal Shelter and a member of other clubs such as the Post and Paddock Club, the Woman's Athletic Club of Chicago, and the Hroswitha Club, a group of female book collectors.

== Papers ==
Frances Hooper collections contain:

- photographs by Tina Modotti, as well as books, manuscripts
- drawings by Carl Linnaeus
- drawings by George Cruikshank
- drawings by Kate Greenaway
- drawings by Lewis Carroll
- drawings by Virginia Woolf
- drawings by Selma Lagerlöf
- drawings by Emily Brontë
- drawings by Anne Brontë

Hooper gave freely her collections to many libraries, offering them materials without charge: her Kate Greenaway collection was given to the Hunt Institute for Botanical Documentation in 1980, while her Carl Linnaeus materials went to the Chicago Horticulture Society, and the main part of her collection of Virginia Woolf materials was donated to Smith College. Hooper had written two books: Collecting Kate Greenaway, and Me (1980) and A Collector in Being (1973) — about collecting arts and books. Hooper is also author of other books including Penny Candy (Chihuahua Press, 1970), The Bonnet (Chihuahua Press, 1972), and A Pilgrimage to Gosta Berling's Varmland (Chihuahua Press, 1976).
