= Huntia (journal) =

- Discipline: Botany
- Language: English
- Edited by: George H.M. Lawrence (1964-1965); Robert W. Kiger (1979-1996); Scarlett Townsend (2000 onwards)

Publication details
- History: 1964 – present
- Publisher: Hunt Institute for Botanical Documentation (USA)

Standard abbreviations
- ISO 4: Huntia

Indexing
- ISSN: 0073-4071
- OCLC no.: 2447473

Huntia is a peer-reviewed scientific journal published by the Hunt Institute for Botanical Documentation, a research division of the Carnegie Mellon University. In continuous publication since 1964, this journal is the institute's scholarly journal of botanical history. The journal is published irregularly in one or more numbers per volume of approximately 200 pages by Hunt Institute.

Huntia was established by the American botanist George H.M. Lawrence, who was the founding director of the Hunt Institute. Volumes 1 to 7, was issued in 14 volumes, large octavo (folded paper) they were paperback apart from Volume 2 which was clothbound.

Vol.2 was reviewed by botanist William C. Steere in June 1966. He noted "outstanding typography, high quality of illustrations and paper, the beautiful style and manufacture all indicate the high standards we have come to anticipate in publications of the Hunt Botanical Library".

There was a big gap in publication of the journal when Lawrence retired from the Hunt Institute in 1970 due to ill health. Dr Robert W. Kiger (Professor of Botany and later Institute Director) took over publishing the journal in 1979 with the new subtitle of 'A Journal of Botanical History'.

Starting with Volume 17, (published in 2019), the journal is now only published online and in colour.

Scarlett T. Townsend has been the Journal Editor since 2000. She, Elizabeth A. Polen and Elizabeth R. Smith also edit 'Botanico-periodicum-Huntia' (the other Hunt Institute periodical about Botanic documentation).

== Known contributors ==
Included (with Year of publication);

- Agnes Arber (1964),
- William Aiton (1965),
- Sir Joseph Banks (1965),
- Angela Burdett-Coutts (1982),
- James L. Reveal (1987),
- Anthony Hurt Wolley-Dod (1982),
- M. E. Mitchell (2011 and 2012),
