= Paste paper =

Type of surface design

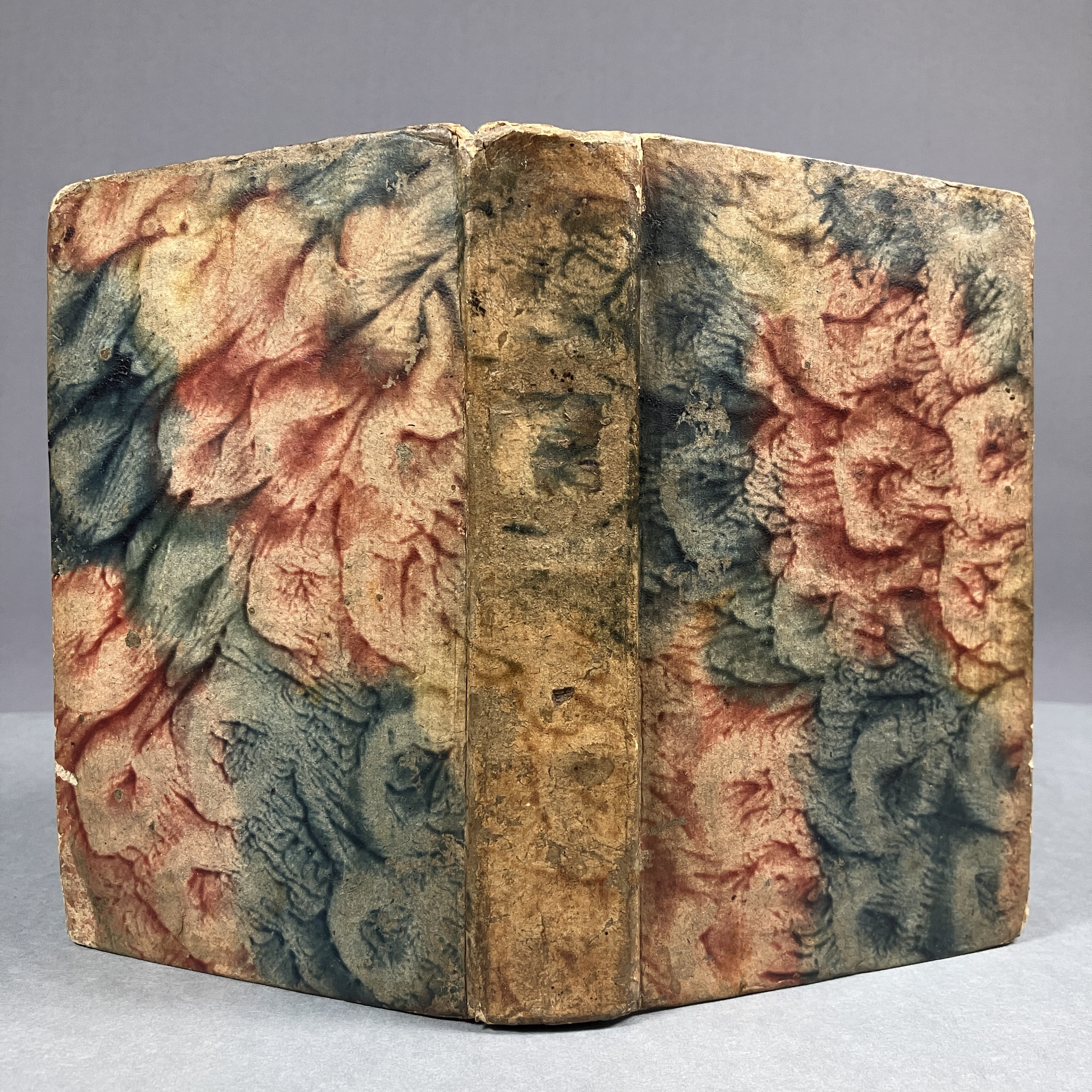
Paste paper used as a book covering, c. 1749.

Paste paper is a type of surface design in which a colored, viscous media (generally starch paste) is applied directly to the surface of a paper sheet and modified with various tools and techniques to render an array of patterns and effects. It is sometimes confused with paper marbling, in which colored designs are created on a bath and then transferred to the paper surface. The term "paste paper" is used to refer to both the articles created using the technique and the technique itself, which has also been used to decorate wooden furniture. Paste papers are used as endpapers and covering papers in bookbinding, furniture linings, and wallpaper.

== Production ==
As an historical and living art form, paste papers are produced with a variety of techniques, tools, and styles which have been openly modified, adapted, and re-imagined over time. Generally, a layer of colored starch paste is applied over the full surface of the paper sheet with a brush, after which this base layer can be further modified with brushes, combs, decorative stamps, fingers, and other implements. A common historical pattern called "veined" (German: geädert) was created by putting the pasted side of two sheets together, then peeling the sheets apart to create dynamic ridges and waves. Wooden blocks, wadded fabric, feathers, and kitchen utensils can be used to create unique effects, along with altering the consistency of the paste and the methods of application. Historical paste papers were generally produced with a starch paste and colorants from plant and mineral sources such as carmine, indigo, buckthorn, and Prussian blue; modern paste papers often utilize acrylic paints and experiment with media including methyl cellulose and other synthetic adhesives.

== History ==
The earliest extant examples of paste paper were produced in Germany in the early 17th century, where cities such as Augsburg were well-established in the production of printed textiles using paste colors. The technique of decorating paper with paste colors was quickly picked up for the production of playing cards and wallpapers, while papers made explicitly for the bookbinding trade became popular starting at the end of the 17th century. Production of these early papers is generally associated with Germany, Austria, and the Netherlands.

In 1764, the Moravian Brethren at Herrnhut settlement began producing paste papers for exportation. Papers produced there were of such a distinct quality and style that paste papers are sometimes generally referred to as "Herrnhuter papers", though their product was virtually never signed and their designs were widely copied. According to church ledgers, paste papers continued to be produced at Herrnhut until around 1824.

Paste papers experienced a resurgence of popularity during the Arts and Crafts movement of the late-19th and early-20th century, with many fine-press publishers producing papers for their publications. The Bird and Bull Press published a sample book of papers in 1975, and further attention was drawn to the technique through the work of makers and researchers including Rosamond Loring, Olga Hirsch, and Albert Haemmerle. Modern makers and researchers include Dirk Lange, Julia Rinck, Susanne Krause, and Madeleine Durham.

== Examples ==
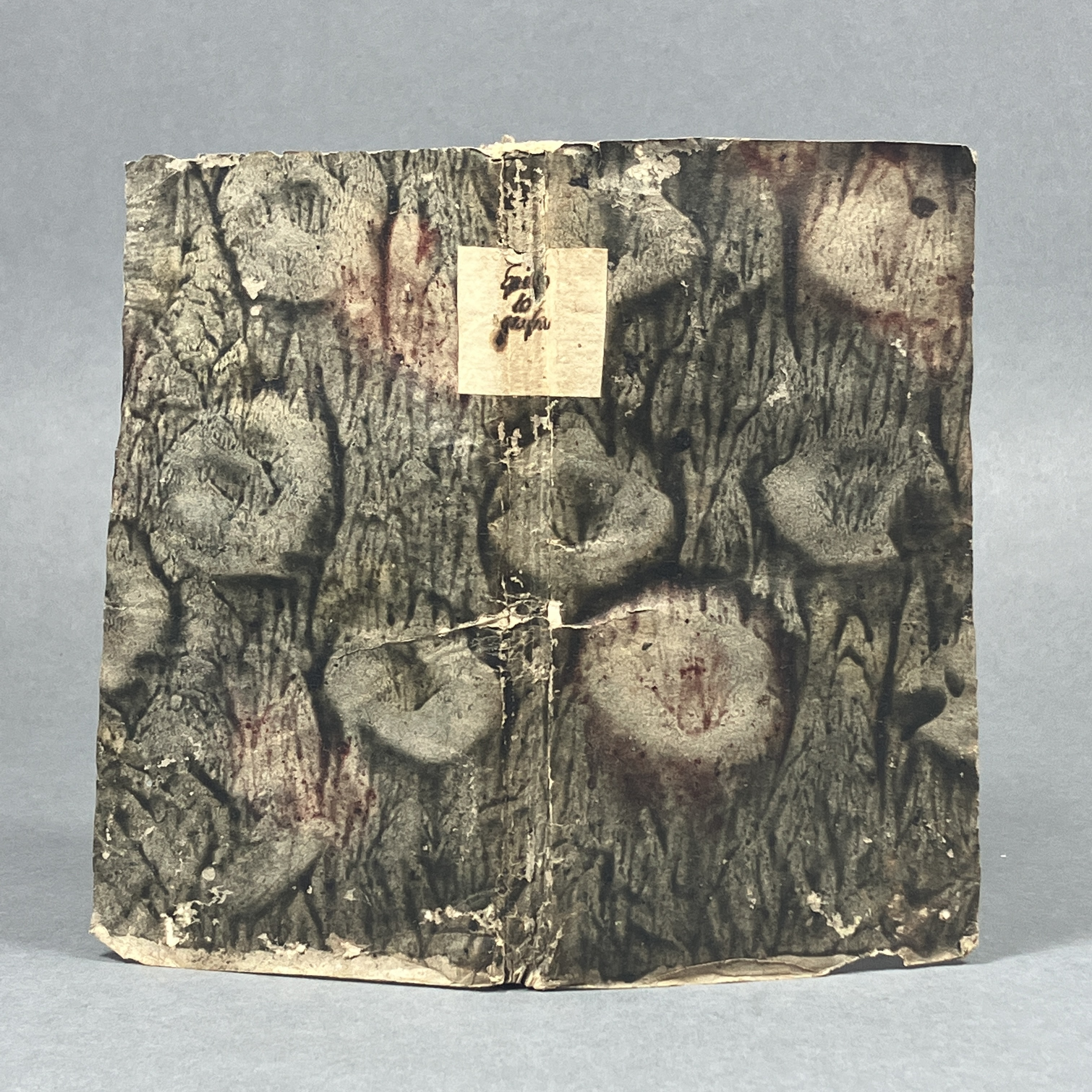
Black and crimson paste paper with impressed designs used as a book wrapper, c. 1810

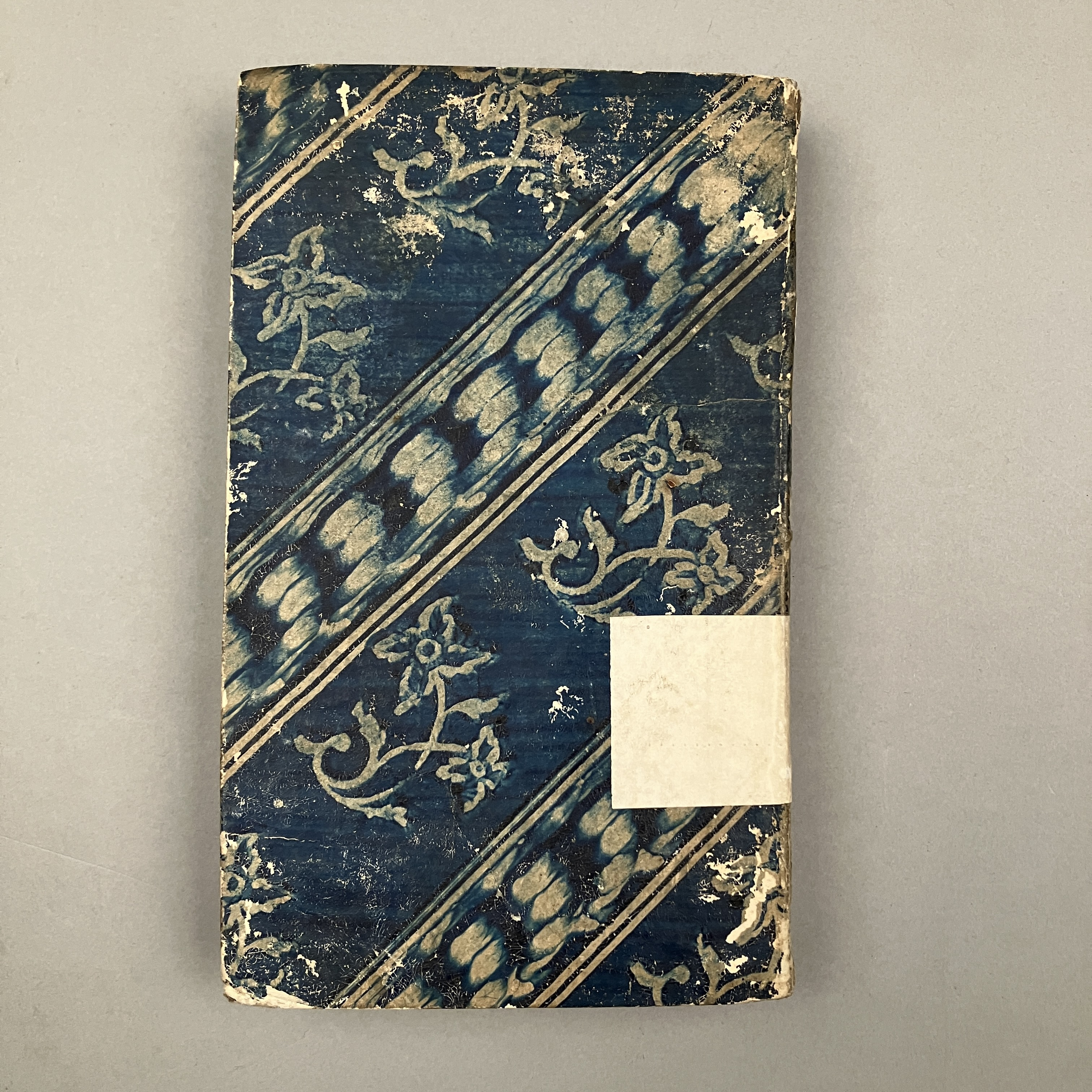
Blue paste paper with impressed designs used as a book covering, c. 1782

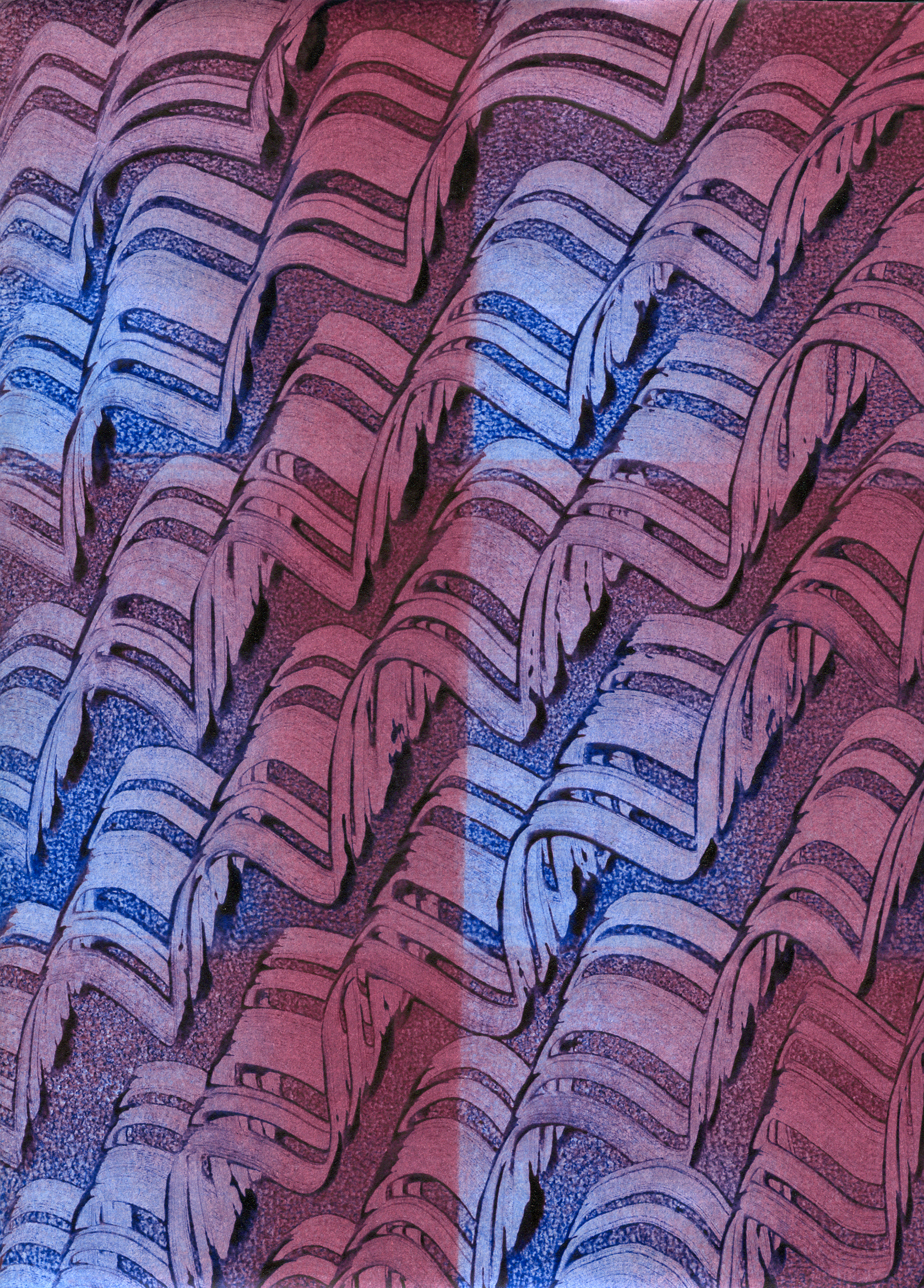
Red and blue paste paper with impressed designs, 20th century

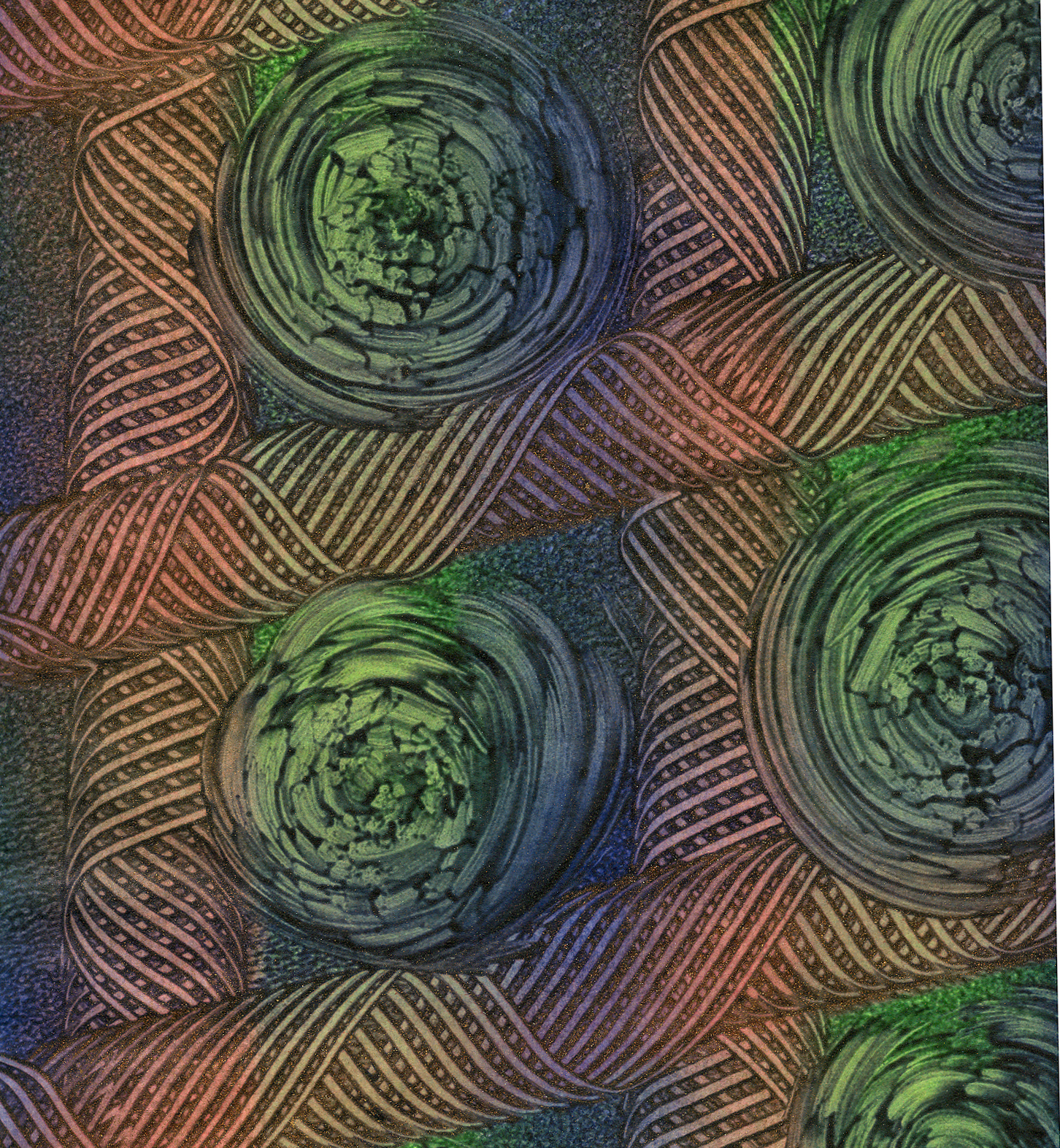
Multi-colored paste paper with impressed designs, 20th century

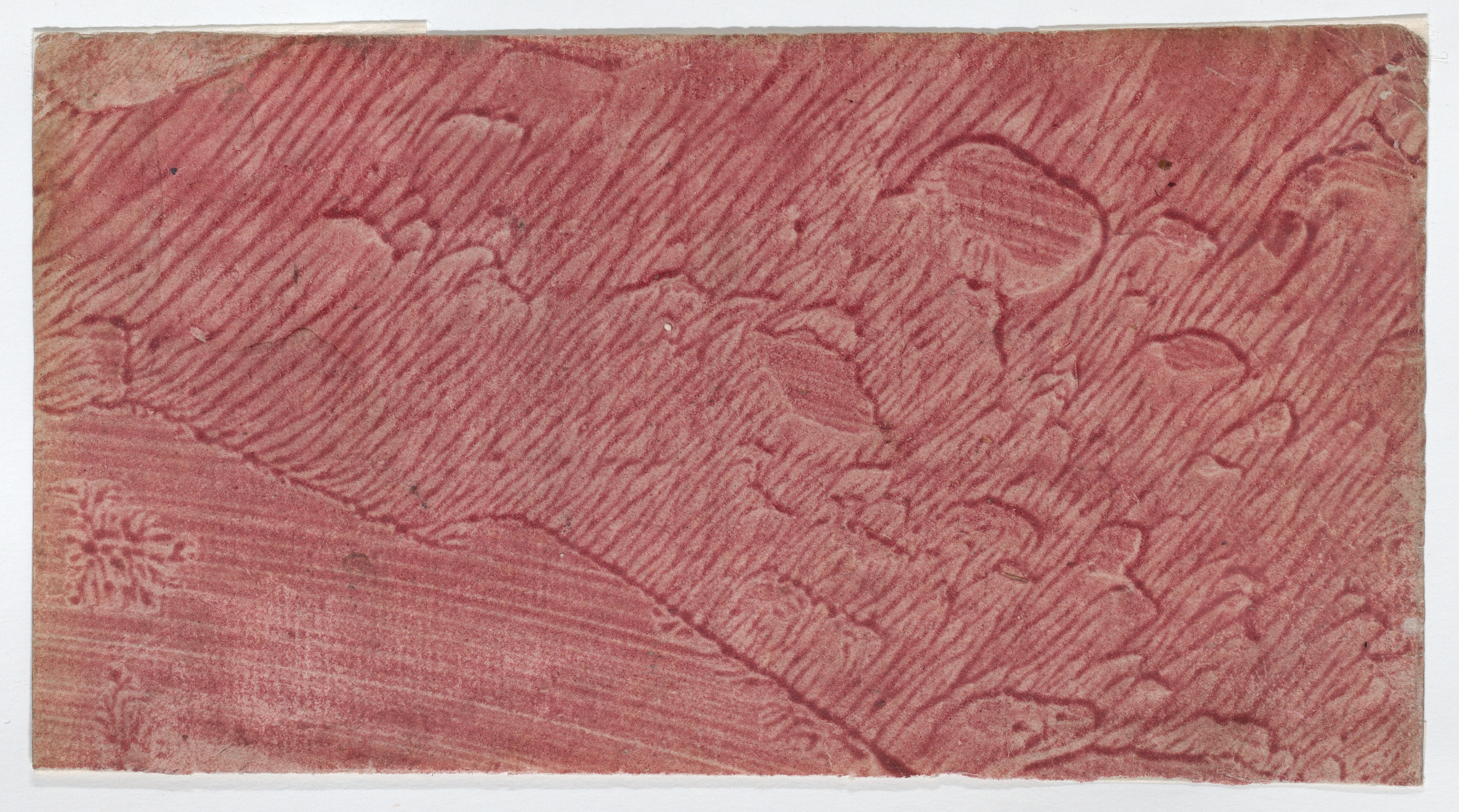
Red paste paper with veined (geädert) pattern, 18th century

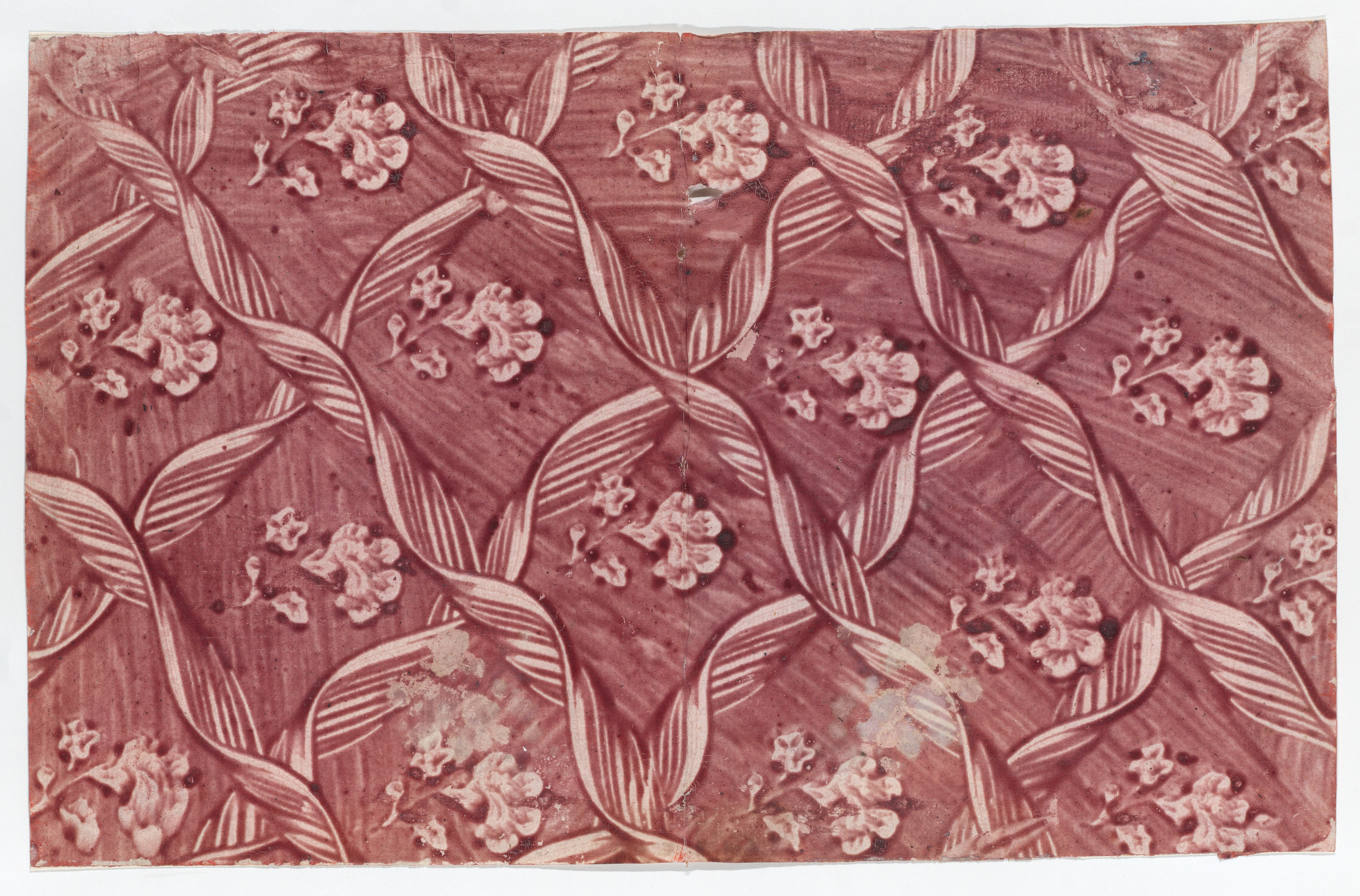
Red paste paper with impressed designs, 19th century

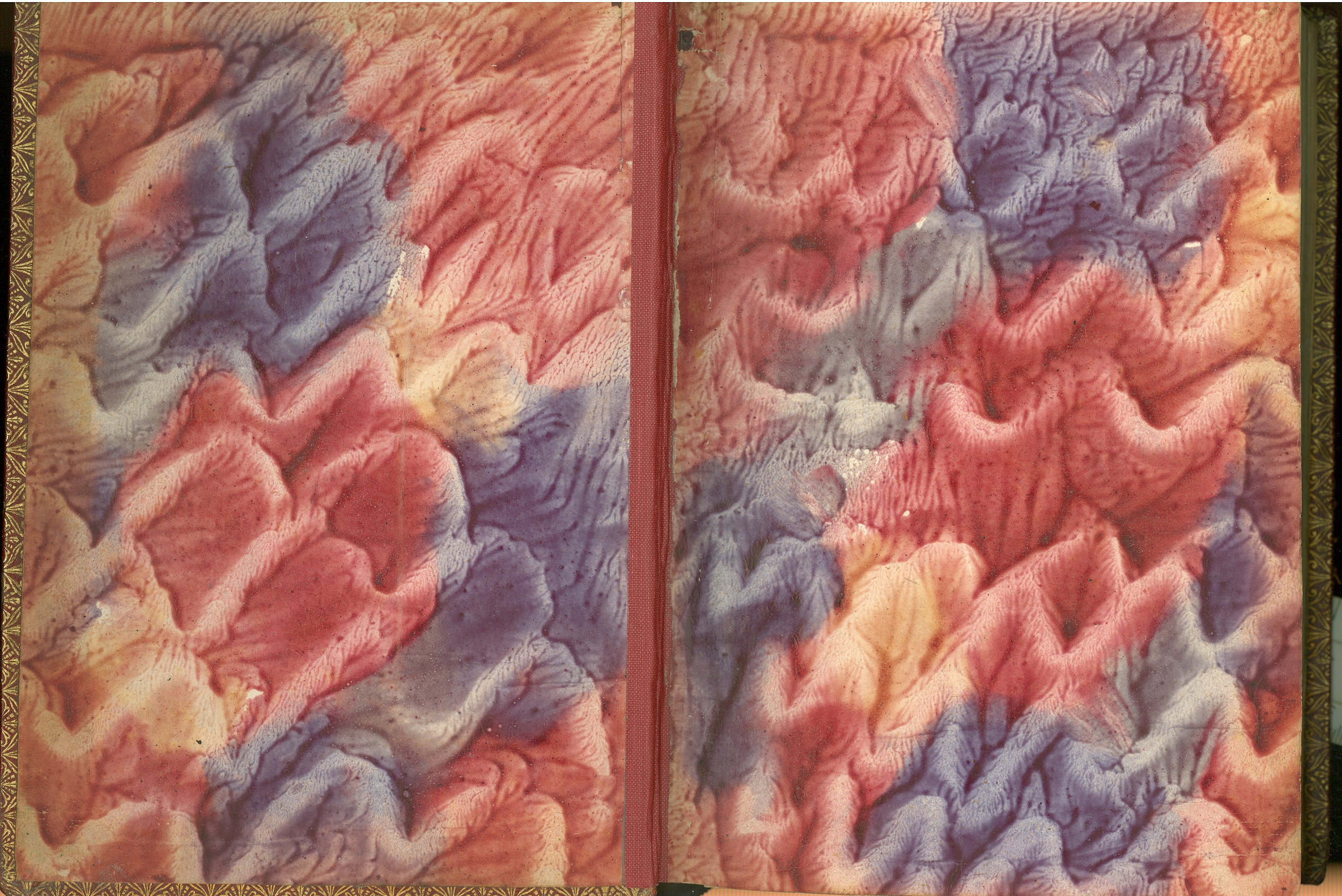
Multi-colored paste paper with impressed designs used as book endpapers, 18th century

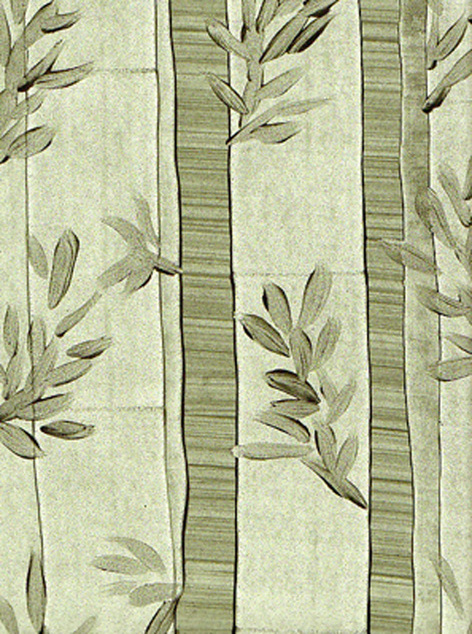
Green paste paper with floral pattern, 21st century
