= Ruth S. Granniss =

American librarian

Ruth S. Granniss (February 17, 1873 – March 6, 1954) was an American librarian, known for her longtime position as Librarian of the Grolier Club, which she held from 1906 to 1944.

== Early life ==
Ruth Shepard Granniss was born on February 17, 1873, in Old Saybrook, Connecticut, to John Henry and Mary Witter (Shepard) Granniss. She had one sister, Miss Sarah Gray Granniss. She was initially educated by her aunt, Frances C. Shepard, and later attended the Rye Seminary, where she met her lifelong friend, Henrietta C. Bartlett. She taught Latin at the Old Saybrook School from 1894 to 1901, and, like Bartlett, attended the Pratt Institute Library School, from which she graduated in 1902. She served as president of the Graduates' Association of the Pratt Institute School of Library Science from 1909 to 1910. Granniss became a friend and colleague of the Pratt Institute's director, Mary Wright Plummer.

In 1917, Ruth and her mother Mary were in a serious streetcar wreck while Ruth was visiting her family in Connecticut. Her mother was killed, and Ruth suffered serious injuries. She recuperated slowly at San Raphael Hospital in New Haven. Her colleagues at the Grolier Club helped defray her hospital expenses.

== Career ==
Grannis was notable as the longtime Librarian of the Grolier Club, a role which she held from 1906 to 1944. She began her career with the club as a cataloger and assistant to her predecessor, Henry Watson Kent, in 1904. Upon Kent's retirement in 1906, Granniss became Librarian. In her early years, she was mentored by bibliographer Beverly Chew.

During the nearly four decades of her tenure, she helped grow the club's library from 8,000 volumes in 1904 to almost 40,000 volumes in 1944, helped develop the club's prominent bookplate collection. In 1917, she supervised the club's move to its new headquarters at 47 East 60th Street, New York, and directed the installation of its collections in the new building. At its new location, Granniss reportedly worked to make the library more open, inviting "non-members, including women and outside scholars" to use the reading room.

In 1928, she travelled to Europe with her friend Henrietta C. Bartlett. Though it was a pleasure trip, she was authorized by the Grolier Club Library Committee to make purchases for the club while she was abroad. In 1935, a reception was held in her honor to celebrate her thirtieth anniversary as the Librarian.

Over her career, she authored over twenty books and articles, and organized several exhibitions and their corresponding catalogues for the club. She was in frequent correspondence with other scholars and librarians, and gave regular lectures on various aspects of book history. She was said to be modest, and reportedly never allowed herself to be photographed. (Mildred Abraham suggests that this reticence may be due in part to facial scarring from injuries sustained in the streetcar accident in 1917.) Despite her position and contributions, she was barred from membership in the Grolier Club (which remained a male-only organization until 1976), and was unable to attend most of its events. She retired from the librarian role in 1944 (with a pension of $100 per month, and a cash gift of $1497 from Club members), and holds the distinction of having the longest single tenure as librarian in the club's history. George Leslie McKay, who had been appointed as her assistant in 1923, succeeded her as librarian.

== Later life and death ==
Granniss was a member of the New York Library Club and the Bibliographical Society of America. In the 1930s, she was an early contributor to The Colophon. In 1944, she was one of the founding members of the Hroswitha Club, a group of women bibliophiles.

In 1945, she moved from New York back to Old Saybrook, Connecticut, to live with her sister Sarah. She died on March 6, 1954, aged 81, possibly following a stroke earlier in the year.

== Selected publications ==
- A garland of poppies (with Henrietta C. Bartlett) (1905)
- An American friend of Southey (1913)
- Theodore Low De Vinne, printer (with Henry Lewis Bullen and James W. Bothwell) (1915)
- Wood-engraving : three essays (1916)
- A descriptive catalogue of the first editions in book form of the writings of Percy Bysshe Shelley, based on a memorial exhibition held at The Grolier Club from April 20, to May 20, 1922 (1923)
- The work of a book club: an address prepared for the Washington Square College Book Club of New York University (1937)
- The Grolier Club and its exhibitions held from time to time : an address (1944)
