= Rosamond B. Loring =

Papermaker and paper historian (1889–1950)

Rosamond Bowditch Loring (May 2, 1889 – September 17, 1950) was an author, bookbinder, and creator, collector and historian of decorated papers. She was active in publishing circles as well as craft organizations. Her collection of historic and modern papers, now housed at Harvard University, is still used by librarians, book publishers, collectors, and researchers.

== Education in craft ==
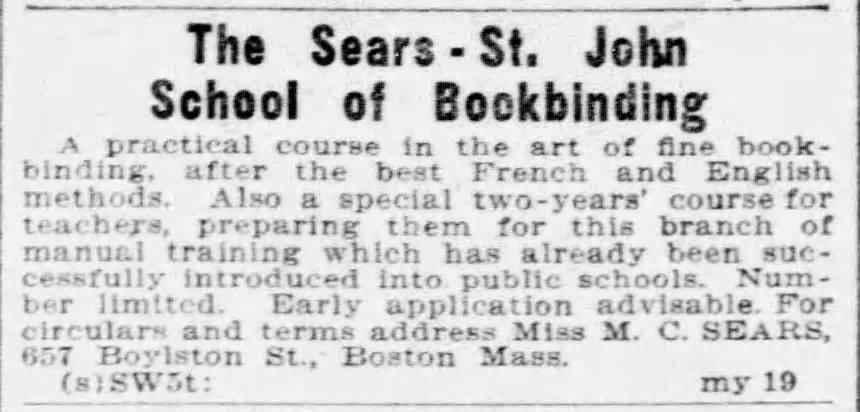
Loring studied bookbinding at the Sears School of Bookbinding (Note: Ad for The Sears - St. John School of Bookbinding in Boston, 1906 Mary Crease Sears (1859–1938) studied art at the Boston Museum School where she became interested in bookbinding. While studying in Paris with Jules Domont, she met Agnes St. John (1862–1926), who had previously studied binding at the School of Industrial Art in Philadelphia and at Hull House in Chicago with Ellen Gates Starr. They returned to Boston and established a workshop and school. Their entries in the crafts exhibition at the St. Louis World's Fair in 1904 earned gold medals.) in Boston's Back Bay. Having difficulty finding high quality decorated paper for use in binding, she turned to making her own, setting up a studio on the top floor of her home and experimenting based on a scrap of information about paste paper gleaned from Joseph Zaehnsdorf's The Art of Bookbinding. She later said, "It sounded so simple, until it came to making them". As she gained experience, she shared her knowledge by lecturing and demonstrating the craft. At one demonstration of marbling in 1928, an observer said, "I like what you do, Mrs. Loring, but you don't do it right!". The critic was Charles V. Saflund, a professional marbler, who came to her studio to give lessons about making marbled and paste papers.

== Commercial work ==
Loring first sold her decorated papers to students at the bookbinding school. She began to receive requests from local publishers, many of whom were family friends; her husband, Gus Loring, was a director of Riverside Press, printers for the Houghton Mifflin publishing company.

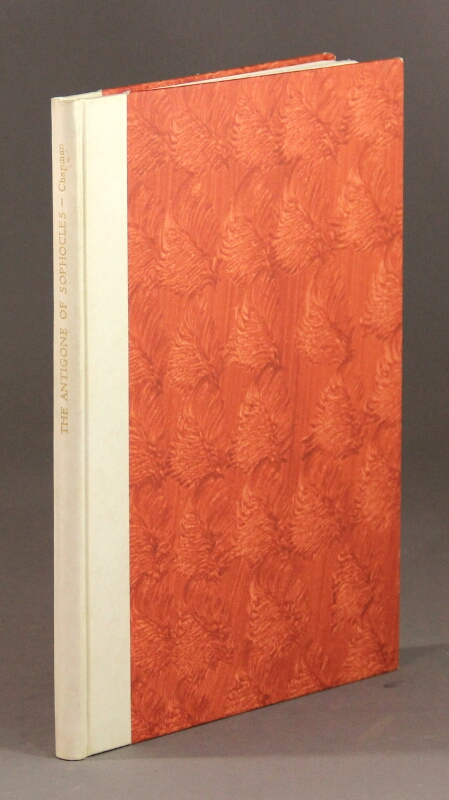
Paste paper cover for The Antigone of Sophocles, 1930

Her first large commission was an order for paper to cover 550 copies of The Antigone of Sophocles, translated by John Jay Chapman and printed by Riverside Press in 1930.

Loring's largest project was The Brothers Karamazov by Fyodor Dostoyevsky, printed in an edition of 1,500 by the Merrymount Press for the Limited Editions Club in 1933. The novel was issued in three volumes, requiring paper for 4,500 books. She spent almost three months churning out 25.5 x 40 inch sheets in three separate colors.

...after making the first few hundred, it became so tiresome that I never could have accomplished the task if I had not had music while I worked. The swing of Strauss waltzes helped me to move the corrugated rolling pin across the paper in time to the music and put me through what otherwise would have been real drudgery.

Most of Loring's commercial output was destined for smaller editions of books published by Merrymount Press, the Limited Editions Club, the Club of Odd Volumes, and the Anthoensen Press in Portland, Maine. In 1933, she proposed charging 15 cents for a 25.5 by 40 inch sheet of paste paper. By 1942, prices had risen to 45–50 cents for a sheet of roller-printed paper. This type of paper covered the Merrymount Press 1934 edition of Charles Dickens's A Christmas Carol. Loring cut out tree shapes from pieces of rubber and glued them to a rolling pin which she used to create a repeating design in the paste.

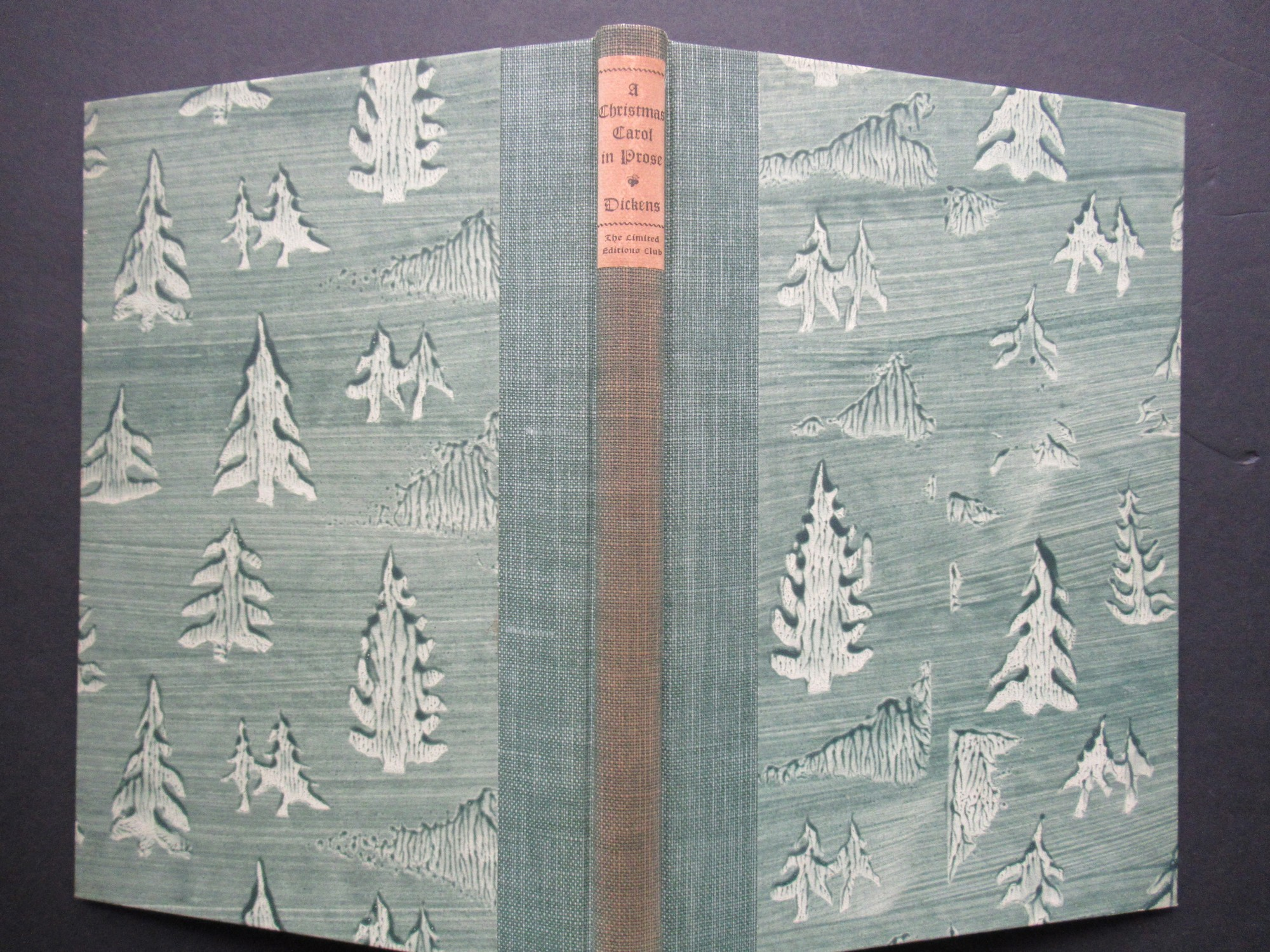
Paste paper cover for A Christmas Carol, 1934

== Collecting ==
Loring began collecting marbled paper but soon, realizing the importance of paste and printed papers in bookbinding, began to collect those as well. She preferred older examples but also collected contemporary printed endpapers. Writing to fellow collector Olga Hirsch, she said:

There seems to be little chance to buy any examples of the old papers here and the only way I have been able to get them is to import them[...] I always ask friends to pick them up for me when they go to Europe but it is slow work.

She purchased paper and traded with other collectors and friends in the book trade, including Hirsch, Dard Hunter, Philip Hofer and Daniel Berkeley Updike. She traveled to Europe in 1937, visiting the Hirschs, the Cockerell bindery and the Victoria & Albert Museum in England, studying museum collections and buying papers for her own.

Loring organized the papers by category: Paste, Marble, Early Printed, Modern Printed, Douglas Cockerell, Oriental, her own papers, book covers, Ingeborg Börjesson, W.C. Doebbelin, and Modern Pictorial Endpapers.

== Clubs and volunteer activity ==
Loring joined the Boston Society of Arts and Crafts in 1921 as an associate member. She was elected a Craftsman member the next year and was promoted to mastership as a "Designer (marbled papers)" in 1934.

In 1927, Loring and Mrs. Goddard M. White founded the Book-in-Hand Guild to recognize the work of women in bookbinding.

Gus Loring joined the Club of Odd Volumes in 1932, becoming President in 1942. His wife was the club's Assistant Librarian from 1936 to 1949. Women were not allowed to become members but she "quietly did all of the hard work in connection with the Club's exhibitions".

The Lorings were also active supporters of the Peabody Museum in Salem, Massachusetts. They both served on the board (Gus was President from 1942 to 1951) and Rosamond was appointed Honorary Curator of Exhibitions in 1942, where she "ably and unobtrusively filled the places of those absent upon military service".

Loring joined the Hroswitha Club, a group of women bibliophiles based in New York City, in 1944.

== Personal life ==
Loring was a great-granddaughter of Nathaniel Bowditch; her parents were Alfred Bowditch and Mary Louise Rice. She was born and raised at "Moss Hill", her family's estate in Jamaica Plain, a Boston neighborhood, where she married Augustus Peabody Loring, Jr. (1885–1951) on June 22, 1911. The couple had five daughters and two sons. For the first eight years of their marriage, they lived year-round in Prides Crossing on the North Shore of Massachusetts. In 1919, they moved to the Back Bay, Boston, spending winters there and summers in Prides Crossing, for the rest of their lives.

== Legacy ==
In 1948, Loring became Honorary Curator of the Paper Collection in the Department of Graphic Arts of the Harvard College Library. She promised to leave her collection to Harvard and established the Rosamond B. Loring Fund for its maintenance and expansion. Shortly after her death, exhibitions of her papers, books and tools were held at the Boston Athenæum and the Boston University library.

Between 2003 and 2007, the staff at Harvard's Houghton Library, where Loring's collections are held, reorganized and cataloged them, making finding aids available on the internet.

- "Rosamond B. Loring collection of decorated papers". Harvard Library. Contains over 10,000 samples.
- "Rosamond B. Loring collection of printed endpapers". Harvard Library.

== Bibliography ==
- Loring, Rosamond B. (1933). Marbled papers. Boston: The Club of Odd Volumes.
Based on a lecture given to The Club of Odd Volumes on November 16, 1932.
Loring discusses her early work in paste papers, her introduction to marbling and subsequent instruction therein by a professional marbler, the making of marbled and paste papers, and the history of marbling. Following are five tipped-in samples of paste paper made by Loring, a sample of monochromatic combed marble paper, and samples for each of five stages in the production of three-color combed marble paper. The paste paper covers are also made by her. Limited to 149 copies.
- —— (2008) [1942]. Decorated Book Papers (4th ed.). Cambridge, Mass.: Houghton Library of the Harvard College Library. ISBN 978-0976547266.
The first edition was limited to 250 copies and included 25 4"x6" tipped-in samples; later editions used photographs of the samples. The second edition, published shortly after Loring's death, included a foreword by Philip Hofer and essays by Walter Muir Whitehill, Dard Hunter, and Veronica Ruzicka. An additional essay and checklist of Loring's work by Hope Mayo was included in the fourth edition.
- —— (January 1949). "Colored Paste Papers". The New Colophon. Vol. 2, no. 5. New York: Duschenes Crawford Inc. pp. 33–40.
Included a page-size sample bound in the journal.
- ——; Bowditch, Mary Orne (1991) [1950]. Marx, W. H. (ed.). Life Here a Century Ago: A Memoir of Moss Hill (Reprint ed.). Jamaica Plain, Mass.: Jamaica Plain Historical Society.
Reminiscences of Rosamond Bowditch Loring and her sister, Mary Orne Bowditch, of life at Moss Hill during the 1890s. The memoir includes a sketched map of Moss Hill and the surrounding area.
- ——; Mayo, Hope; Berger, Sidney E. (2007). Marbled and Paste Papers: Rosamond Loring's Recipe Book (Facsimile ed.). Cambridge, Mass.: Houghton Library of the Harvard College Library. ISBN 978-0976547259.

== Gallery ==
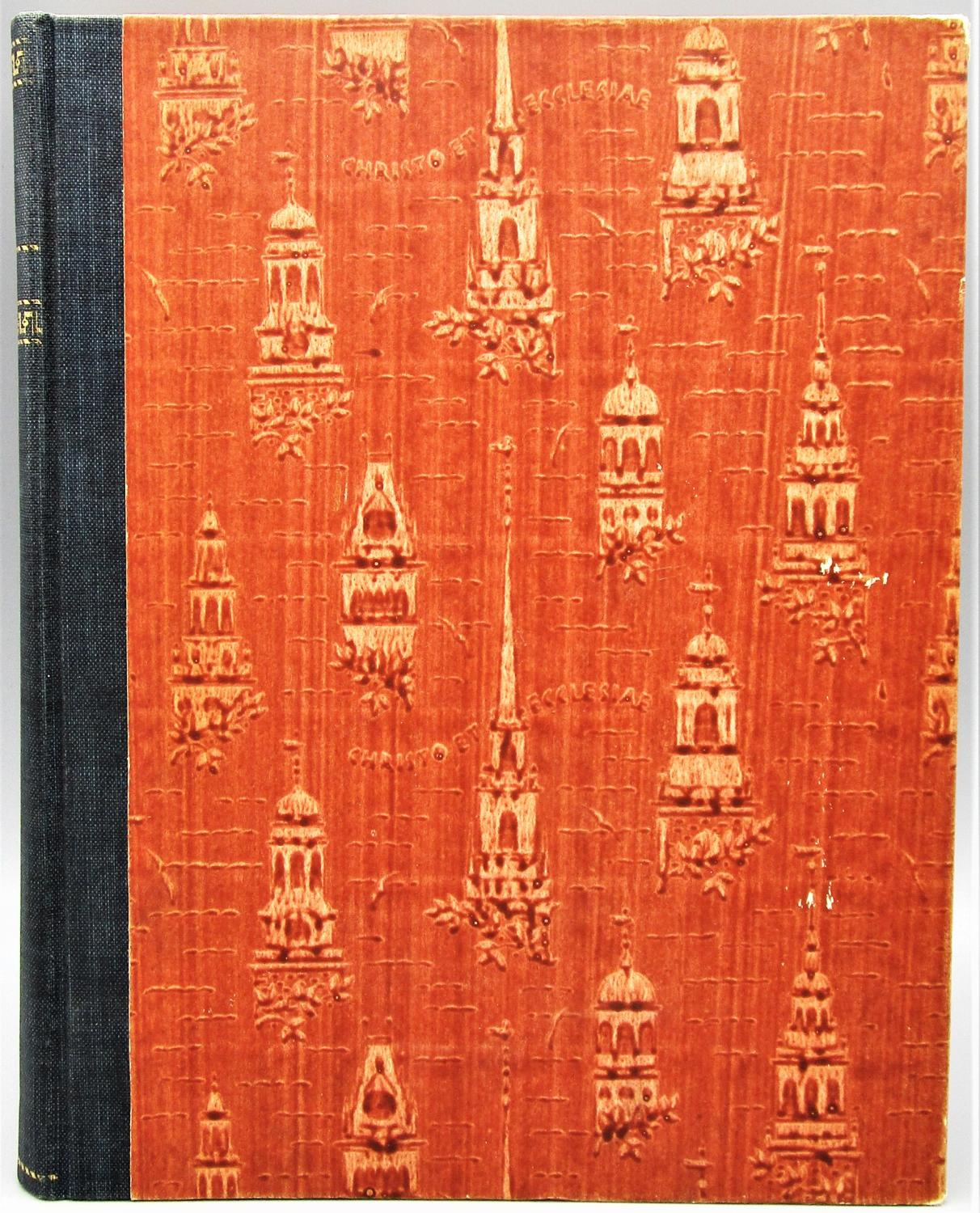
Handmade paste paper covers the first edition of Decorated Book Papers

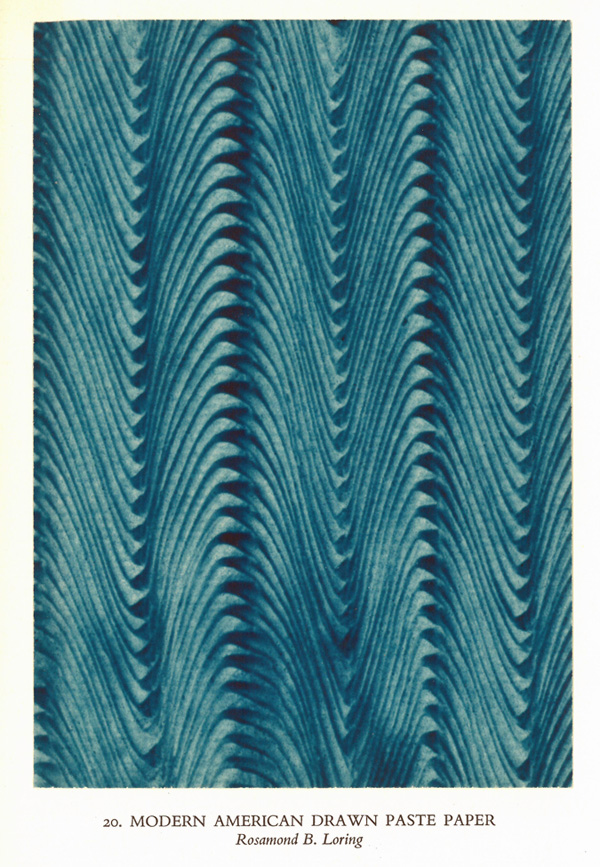
Handmade paste paper sample from Decorated Book Papers

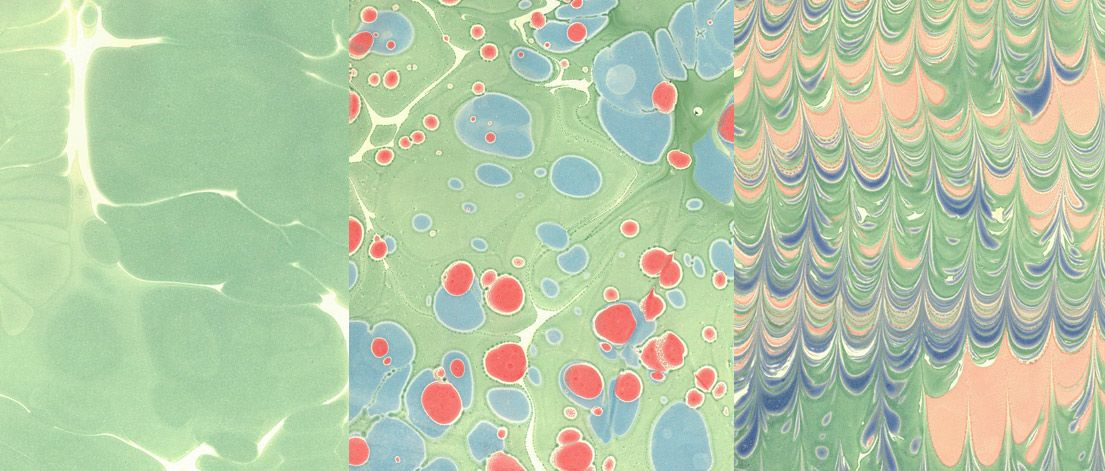
Three states of marbled paper

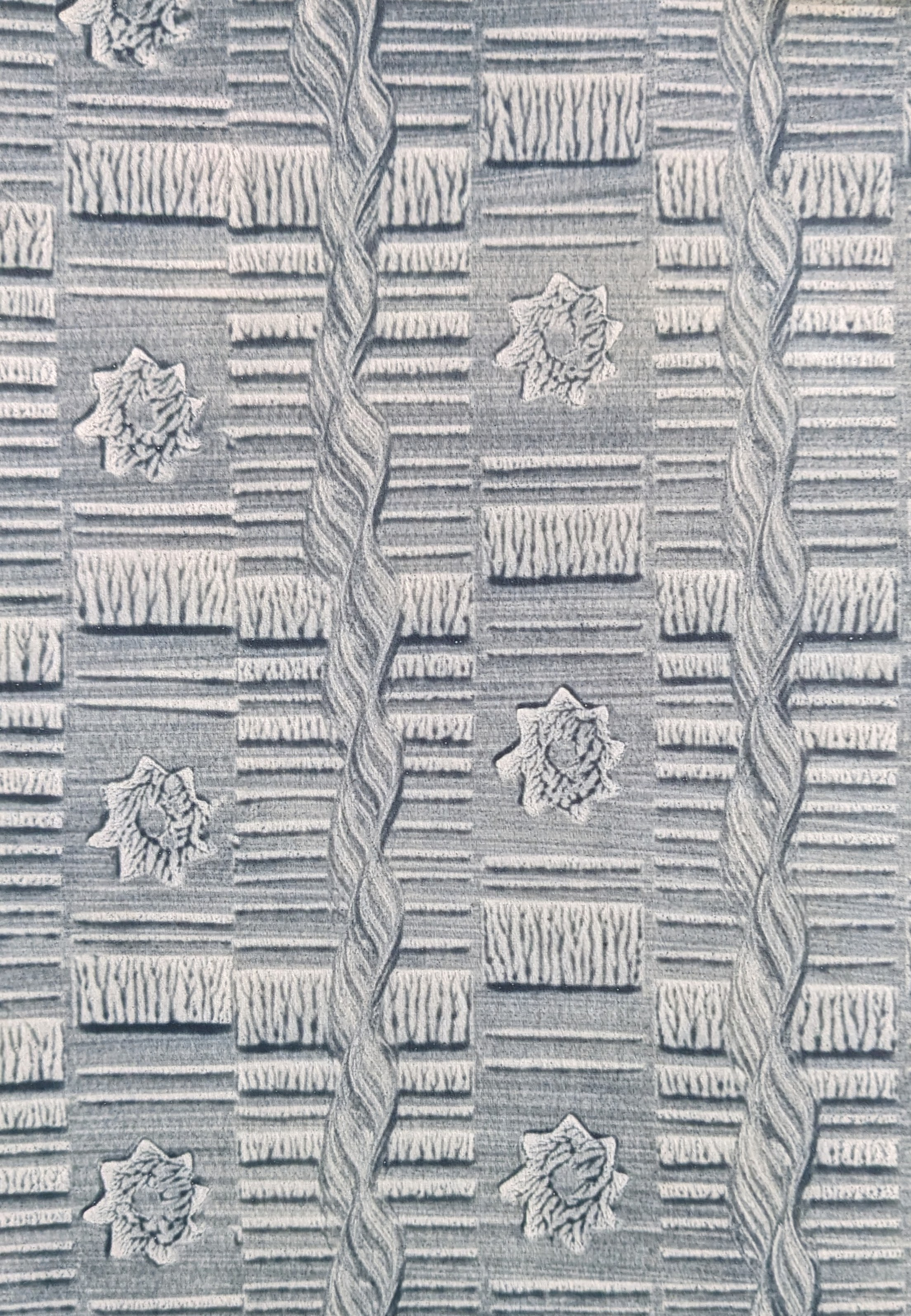
Paste paper sample in Colored Paste Papers
