= Hroswitha Club =

Women's bibliophile club in New York City

The Hroswitha Club was a membership-based club of women bibliophiles and collectors based in New York City, active from 1944 to 2004.

== Founding ==
The Hroswitha Club was founded in 1944 by a group of women bibliophiles: Sarah Gildersleeve Fife (who convened the group), Belle da Costa Greene, Anne Lyon Haight, Ruth S. Granniss, Eleanor Cross Marquand, Henrietta C. Bartlett and Rachel McMasters Miller Hunt. It was named in honor of Hrotsvitha of Gandersheim, a 10th-century German secular canoness, dramatist and poet. At the time of the Club's founding, women bibliophiles were not allowed membership in many premier bibliographic societies such as the Grolier Club, the oldest existing bibliophilic club in North America, or the Caxton Club. (This policy remained in place at both the Grolier and Caxton Clubs until 1976.) The first meeting of the Hroswitha Club was held on November 16, 1944, at the Cosmopolitan Club. It held regular meetings four to five times a year at multiple locations, and held its 200th meeting in 1994.

Members of the Hroswitha Club included authors, bibliographers, librarians, curators, and private collectors. Individual members had a wide range of collecting interests - they collected books not just about Hroswitha, but also boxing, "military costumes," and Walt Whitman; at least one member was a collector of incunabula. By the 1950s, membership had been reportedly capped at 40 members. Some notable members were Sarah Gildersleeve Fife, Anne Lyon Haight, Belle da Costa Greene, Frances Hooper, Ruth S. Granniss (librarian to the Grolier Club), Rachel McMasters Miller Hunt, Rosamond B. Loring, Eleanor Cross Marquand, and Shakespeare scholar Henrietta C. Bartlett.

== Activities ==
Members of the Hroswitha Club included authors, bibliographers, librarians, curators, and private collectors. They exchanged ideas, carried out research, and organized talks and visits to book collecting institutions both private and public. In 1948 Belle da Costa Greene, one of the few professional women then in the club, organized a visit to the Pierpont Morgan Library, giving group members access to the vault of rare materials.

Additionally, the Club published several works throughout the 20th century, most notably a 1965 bibliography of Hroswitha almost a decade in the making; entitled Hroswitha of Gandersheim: Her Life, Times and Works, it was edited by Anne Lyon Haight with contributions from other Club members. Members carried out original research, establishing the dates that Hroswitha's dramas were performed. The Club also commissioned a life of Hroswitha, by Robert Herndon Fife (1947).

The Club maintained its own private library, established in 1948 and later named the Sarah Gildersleeve Fife Memorial Library in honor of the club's founder; it specialized in books about Hroswitha, books published by members of the club, and other books of interest to collectors. The club's official bookplate was inspired by a copy of Albrecht Dürer's woodcut of Hroswitha that Rachel McMasters Miller Hunt acquired and donated to the club; she later had her friend Sarah B. Hill design the club's bookplate based on the woodcut.

Records of the Club's correspondence and activities are found principally at the Grolier Club. Additionally, the Princeton University Library holds an address to the Club on the occasion of their visit by scholar and collector Miriam Y. Holden.

== Publications ==
- Barlow, Marjorie Dana. Notes on woman printers in Colonial America and the United States, 1639-1975. (New York: Hroswitha Club; Charlottesville, Va.: distributed by the University Press of Virginia, 1976)
- Haight, Anne Lyon. Hroswitha of Gandersheim: her life, times and works, and a comprehensive bibliography. (New York: Hroswitha Club, 1965)
