= Rachel McMasters Miller Hunt =

American bookbinder and book collector

Rachel McMasters Miller Hunt (1882-1963) was an American bookbinder and book collector, specializing in botanical literature.

== Early life ==
Rachel McMasters Miller was born in Turtle Creek, Pennsylvania, in 1882 to Rachel Hughey McMasters Miller (1861–1940) and Mortimer Craig Miller (1856–1933), a maritime lawyer. She attended the Thurston School in Pittsburgh, followed by Miss Mittleberger's School for Girls in Cleveland, from which she graduated in June 1901 as president of her class.

== Bookbinder ==
While on a trip with her family to the Pan-American Exposition in 1901, Miller visited the Roycroft community of craftsmen. This trip inspired her to experiment with making her own hand-bound books. In 1903, she was introduced to suffragette and bookbinder Euphemia Bakewell, and studied with her in Pittsburgh for two years. On a trip to Europe with her parents in 1905, Miller Hunt visited T. J. Cobden-Sanderson's Doves Bindery, and was also able to purchase supplies for her own bookbinding work, such as hand-marbled endpapers, stamping tools, and a stock of gold leaf.

Back in the United States, Miller established her own bindery, which she named the Lehcar Bindery ("Rachel" spelled backwards), in Shadyside. There, she produced over 126 complete bindings, performing all aspects of the work except for edge gilding. She worked on numerous commissions and exhibited in several national book exhibitions, and in 1907, she joined the recently founded Guild of Book Workers of New York. Her work was praised by binder Alfred de Sauty for its "finely balanced sense of craftsmanship." In 1908, she met T. J. Cobden-Sanderson while he was visiting Euphemia Bakewell; Cobden-Sanderson invited her to visit him in Hammersmith, which she did, staying at the Doves Bindery for almost a year.

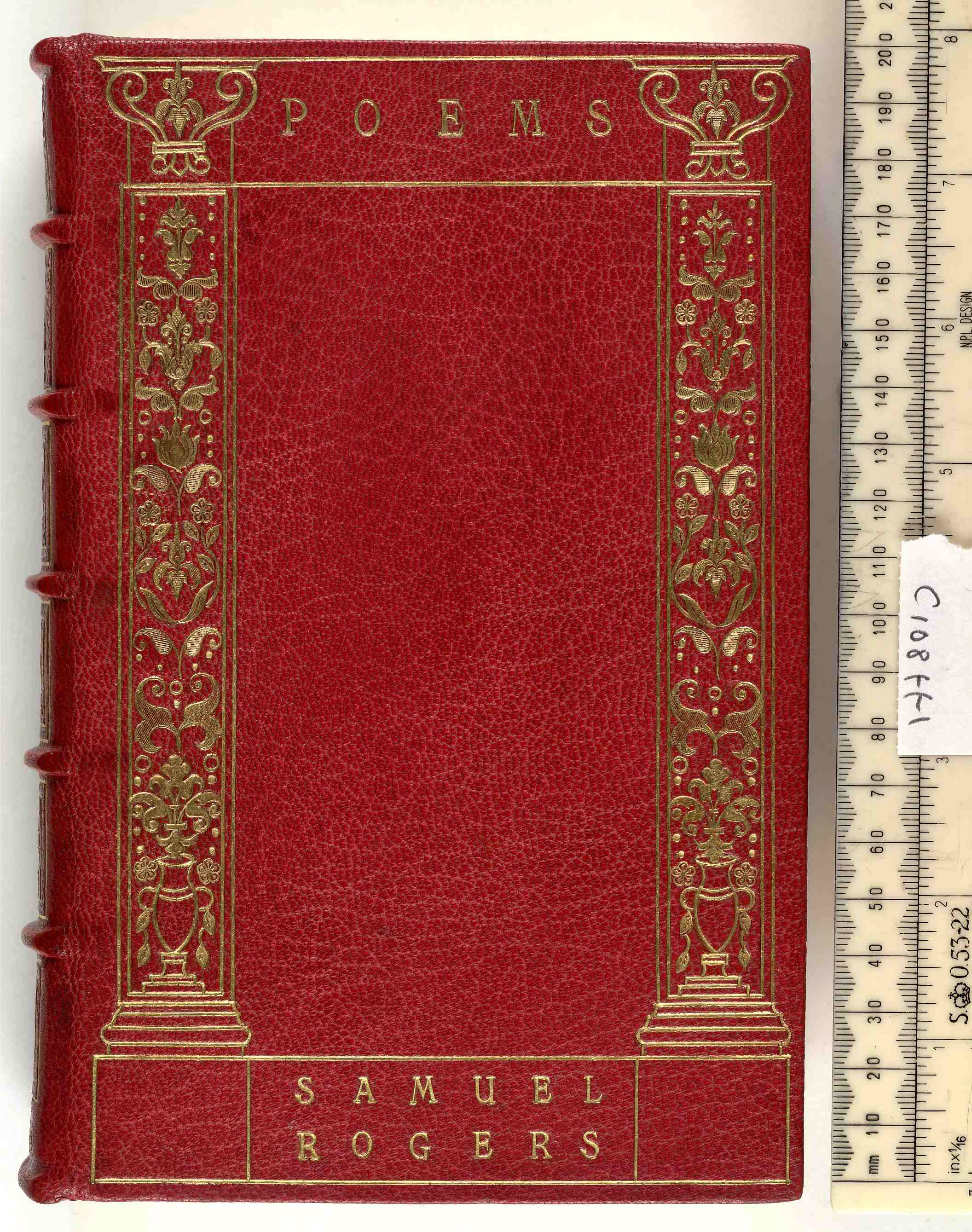
An example of Hunt's work - a binding created in 1916 for an edition of Samuel Rogers's Poems

She continued creating and exhibiting bindings until about 1920. Her last public showing of her work was at the Guild of Bookworkers' annual exhibition in 1921, held at the Grolier Club. Throughout the 1920s and 1930s, Hunt became a distinguished speaker on books and bookbinding, though she was no longer an active practitioner. She continued to maintain her binding equipment in a workshop at "Elmhurst," the Pittsburgh home she and her husband moved to in 1926, and continued to refer to it as the "Lehcar Bindery."

== Book collector ==
One of Hunt's treasured books as a child was How to Know the Wild Flowers, by Mrs. William Starr Dana, a gift from a friend of her mother. At fifteen, she was given a copy of Leonard Meager's The English Gardener by a family member, which inspired in her a lifelong interest for book collecting, particularly books about botany and plants. She attended her first book sale in 1911, at the age of 29, where she purchased two botanical works, one of which was a copy of Jardin d'Hyver ou Cabinet des Fleurs, a gardening work by Jean Franeau, sieur de Lestocquoy.

After her marriage in 1913, Rachel continued to collect works on botany and gardening, and developed a network of relationships among librarians, gardeners, bibliographers, authors, collectors, and scholars. In 1936, the Hunts began building a library at their home "Elmhurst" to house her growing book collection. Rachel sometimes accompanied her husband Roy on business trips, allowing her to tour gardens in South America, the Caribbean and Europe. As her connections to the botanical and bibliophile communities grew, Rachel hosted intellectual gatherings at her home, in addition to speaking engagements at outside organizations. She was the first woman to lecture at the Grolier Club (at that time still an all-male organization), and was a founding member of the Hroswitha Club. Her collection included over 6,000 bookplates, many of them designed for her by her friend Sarah B. Hill, and in 1922, she was a founding member of the American Bookplates Designers and Collectors Society. She was also an active member of the Garden Club of Allegheny County, the Garden Club of America, the American Horticultural Society, and the Herb Society of America.

Her career as a lecturer continued well into the 1950s. In 1958, the first volume of a catalogue of her book collection was produced by Jane Quinby. In 1960, Rachel McMasters Miller Hunt and Roy Hunt founded the Hunt Botanical Library (known as the Hunt Institute for Botanical Documentation starting in 1971, as its collection and mission continued to grow). Rachel took a very involved role in the planning and design of the library, as well as the moving of her collection into the building.

== Personal life ==
As a child, Rachel "thought it would be great fun to be an acrobat".

She stayed friends with Euphemia Bakewell for many years, as well as other women bookbinders such as Eleanor and Amy Dupuy, Mrs. Elizabeth Utley Thomas, and Sarah Hill, all of whom attended her wedding.

On 11 June 1913, she married Roy Arthur Hunt, a rising executive at Alcoa. Both shared a love for rare books. As an engagement gift for Roy, Rachel bound a prayer-book in "violet crushed morocco, tooled with aluminum leaf." The Book of Common Prayer with which the Hunts' marriage ceremony was performed by Bishop Cortlandt Whitehead was also bound by Rachel, in red and gold. For their honeymoon, the Hunts toured Sweden, Norway, and Russia, where Rachel acquired some gemstones to be used in her bindings. When World War I broke out, the Hunts (then safely back in the United States) worked with Euphemia Bakewell, travelling in Europe, to distribute funding to help orphans and child refugees. In April 1919, their first child, a son, was born, followed by three more brothers over the next seven years.

Hunt died on 22 February 1963, after a prolonged bout of the flu. Roy died three years later on 21 October 1966.
