= Anne Lyon Haight =

American author, essayist, rare book collector (1891-1977)

- Born: Anne Pardee Lyon; May 11, 1891; St. Paul, Minnesota, U.S.
- Died: August 8, 1977 (aged 86); Litchfield, Connecticut
- Education: The Masters School, Dobbs Ferry, New York
- Occupations: Author, book collector
- Spouse(s): Sherman Post Haight, Sr.

Anne Lyon Haight (May 11, 1891 – August 8, 1977) was an American author, essayist, and collector of rare books and artifacts.

She was born Anne Pardee Lyon in St. Paul, Minnesota, on May 11, 1891, and was educated at the Masters School in Dobbs Ferry, New York.

Haight is best remembered as an author and collector, and for her active memberships in many clubs and societies. She was a founding member of the Hroswitha Club, and served at least one term as its president. She published a short biography of Hroswitha of Gandersheim under the club's auspices. Her personal collection included an early edition of Clement Clarke Moore's "A visit from St. Nicholas." Haight was credited with starting the Children's Book of the Month Club. Her other club memberships included the National Society of the Colonial Dames of America, the Women's Theodore Roosevelt Memorial Association, the Society of Woman Geographers, and the Women Fly Fishers Club.

In addition to studying book history and collecting rare volumes, she was also an aviation enthusiast, and studied Native American cultures. During World War I, she worked in the American Women's War Relief Hospital in Devonshire, England, and later worked with the Red Cross in Washington, DC. She flew with Charles Lindbergh on several of his notable flights: she was a passenger on the first trans-Atlantic flight on a Pan-American Clipper in June 1939, and also on the first Clipper flight to South America. She wrote about her experiences for several national magazines.

She participated in several American Museum of Natural History-organized research expeditions to the Isthmus of Panama to study Native American civilizations. She and her husband collected Native American artifacts, many of which were donated to the Hood Museum of Art. At one point, she travelled to Saudi Arabia (likely with her husband, who was an executive of the World Wildlife Fund), where she was a guest of King Saud, to advocate for the preservation of the Arabian oryx.

She was married to Sherman Post Haight, Sr. (1889–1980), with whom she had two sons and a daughter. She died at her home in Litchfield, Connecticut, on August 8, 1977.

== Publications ==
- Banned books: Informal Notes on Some Books Banned for Various Reasons at Various Times and in Various Places (New York: R.R. Bowker, 1935, 1955, 1970, 1978). Second edition (1955) available via HathiTrust
- "Are women the natural enemies of books?" in Bookmaking on the Distaff Side (New York: The Distaff Side, 1937)
- A portrait of Latin America as seen by her print makers (New York: Hastings House, 1946)
- Hroswitha of Gandersheim: her life, times and works, and a comprehensive bibliography (New York: Hroswitha Club, 1965)
- "The Night Before Christmas" An Exhibition Catalogue, Compiled by George H. M. Lawrence. Foreword by Anne Lyon Haight, (The Pittsburgh Bibliophiles, 1964)
