= Hunt Institute for Botanical Documentation =

US academic institution

The Hunt Institute for Botanical Documentation (HIBD), dedicated as the Rachel McMasters Miller Hunt Botanical Library in 1961, is a research division of Carnegie Mellon University.

== History ==
HIBD is named for Rachel McMasters Miller Hunt. She donated a collection of botanical books to the university to create HIBD. An annual monetary award is given in her honor by the institute.

HIBD was dedicated October 10, 1961. George H. M. Lawrence was the founding director. In 1970, Gilbert Daniels, became the second director. T. D. Jacobsen succeeded Robert Kiger as director in 2019.

== Description ==
HIBD is an institution of international bibliographical research in the fields of botany, horticulture, and plant science history. It has a research library with over 30,000 works and art holdings. It includes art and bibliography departments.

HIBD is better known internationally than in the U.S. It has a collection of botanical paintings (many of them watercolors), drawings, and prints dating from the Renaissance to contemporary works. Its library has books from an equally expansive time frame.

HIBD hosts public exhibitions, including the triennial International Exhibition of Botanical Art & Illustration since 1964. That exhibition coincides with the educational conference of the American Society of Botanical Artists in Pittsburgh.

== Publications ==
- Botanico-Periodicum-Huntanium (first started in 1968, Sept 2004 BPH2 began)
- Bulletin of the Hunt Institute for Botanical Documentation
- Catalogue of Botanical Books in the Collection of Rachel McMasters Hunt
- Huntia is a peer-reviewed scientific journal published by the Hunt Institute for Botanical Documentation. In continuous publication since 1964, this journal is the institute's scholarly journal of botanical history. The journal is published irregularly in one or more numbers per volume of approximately 200 pages by Hunt Institute. Starting with volume 17, the journal is now only published online and in color.
