= Hyder Edward Rollins =

American scholar and English professor

- Known for: Editions of Elizabethan poetic miscellanies and broadside ballads, Keats scholarship

Academic background
- Education: Southwestern University; University of Texas; Harvard University

Academic work
- Sub-discipline: Elizabethan poetry, broadside ballads, and Romantic poets
- Institutions: New York University; Harvard University

Hyder Edward Rollins (8 November 1889 – 25 July 1958) was an American scholar and English professor. He was a prolific author of articles and books on Elizabethan poetry, broadside ballads, and Romantic poets. He was an internationally recognized scholar on John Keats, and he edited the authoritative two-volume edition of Keats' letters.

== Life ==
Rollins was born in Abilene, Texas, to Nathaniel G. and Elva (Hyder) Rollins. He entered Southwestern University at the age of 14. He took time off to teach in country schools and earned his B. A. in 1910. Two years later he earned an M. A. from the University of Texas, and taught English there for two years. In 1914 he entered Johns Hopkins University graduate school, and in 1915 he entered Harvard University, where he took his Ph.D. in 1917. When the U.S. entered World War I he declined a Harvard Sheldon Traveling Fellowship to enlist in the U.S. Army Signal Corps as a private, and served in France as a second lieutenant for the duration. In 1919 he returned to Europe on the fellowship he had declined before the war.

In 1920, Rollins was appointed assistant professor at New York University, becoming a full professor four years later. He returned to Harvard in 1926, and in 1939 he succeeded George Lyman Kittredge as Gurney Professor of English. He directed more than 100 doctoral dissertations during his Harvard career, retiring in 1956 and continuing to reside in Cambridge. The last four years of his life were devoted to fixing the sequence and text of Keats' letters. With his eyesight and health failing, Rollins finished proofreading galleys a few weeks before his death. He never married. He is buried in Abilene.

== Selected works ==
- "O. Henry." The Sewanee Review '22: 2, Spring, 1914, pp. 213–232. Reprinted in Twentieth-Century Literary Criticism, Vol. 19.
- The Troilus-Cressida Story from Chaucer to Shakespeare (1917)
- Old English Ballads, 1553–1625: Chiefly from Manuscripts (1920)
- A Contribution to the History of the English Commonwealth Drama (1921)
- A Pepysian Garland: Broadside Ballads of the Years 1595-1639, Chiefly from the Collection of Samuel Pepys (1922)
- Cavalier and Puritan: Ballads and Broadsides Illustrating the Period of the Great Rebellion, 1640–1660 (1923)
- An Analytical Index to the Ballad-Entries (1557–1709) in the Registers of the Company of Stationers of London (1924)
- A Gorgeous Gallery of Gallant Inventions (1926)
- The Pack of Autolycus: Or, Strange and Terrible News of Ghosts, Apparitions, Monstrous Births, Showers of Wheat, Judgments of God, and Other Prodigious and Fearful Happenings as Told in Broadside Ballads of the Years 1624–1693 (1927)
- The Paradise Of Dainty Devices (1576–1606) (1927)
- Tottel's Miscellany, 1557–1587 (1928)
- The Pepys Ballads (8 vols.) (1929-1932)
- The Phoenix Nest, 1593 (1931)
- A Poetical Rhapsody, 1602–1621 (1931): vol. 1, vol. 2
- Brittons Bowre of Delights, 1591 (1933)
- England's Helicon (1935)
- The Arbor of Amorous Devices, 1597, by Nicholas Breton and Others (1936)
- The Passionate Pilgrim by William Shakespeare (1940)
- A New Variorum Edition of Shakespeare: The Sonnets (1944)
- An O. Henry Cocktail (1947)
- The Keats Circle: Letters and Papers and More Letters and Poems of the Keats Circle (1948)
- The Renaissance in England: Non-Dramatic Prose and Verse of the Sixteenth Century (1954), with Herschel Baker
- The Letters of John Keats: 1814–1821 2 vols. (1958)

== Sources ==
- Baker, Herschel Clay. "Hyder Edward Rollins", Harvard Library Bulletin 14:1 (1960), pp. 5–11. Reprinted in Baker, Herschel Clay, Hyder Edward Rollins: A Bibliography (Cambridge MA: Harvard University Press, 1960).
- Fleming, Richard T. "Rollins, Hyder Edward," Handbook of Texas Online, Texas State Historical Association, 1976. (A brief summary of Baker 1960.)
- "Hyder Edward Rollins", Keats-Shelley Journal 8:1 (1959), pp. 1–3.
- "Hyder Edward Rollins", Report of the President of Harvard College and Reports of the Departments, 1957–1958 (Official Register of Harvard University 56:22, August 31, 1959), pp. 23–24.
