= Patrick S. Herendeen =

Botanist

- Born: June 5, 1959; South Bend, Indiana
- Education: California State University, Long Beach (B.S.), Michigan State University (M.S.), Indiana University (Ph.D.)
- Scientific career
- Fields: Paleobotany, taxonomy, evolutionary biology
- Workplaces: Indiana University, The George Washington University, National Science Foundation, The Field Museum, Northwestern University, Chicago Botanic Garden
- Theses: The Alvars of the Maxton Plains, Drummond Island, Michigan: Present Community Composition and Vegetation Changes (1985); Fossil History of the Leguminosae from the Eocene of Southeastern North America (1990)
- Doctoral advisor: David L. Dilcher

Dr. Patrick Stephen Herendeen (born 1959) is an American botanist with expertise in paleobotany and evolutionary biology of Cretaceous Age fossil plants. He is the Senior Director of Systematics and Evolutionary Biology and Senior Scientist at the Chicago Botanic Garden and teaches at Northwestern University. Herendeen is the president of the International Association for Plant Taxonomy.
