= Baileya (journal) =

Baileya : a quarterly journal of horticultural taxonomy
- Discipline: Botany
- Language: English
- Edited by: George H.M. Lawrence 1954 - 1960,

Publication details
- History: 1953 – 1996
- Publisher: Cornell University Press, Ithaca, New York (USA)
- Frequency: Quarterly

Standard abbreviations
- ISO 4: Baileya

Indexing
- ISSN: 0005-4003
- OCLC no.: 729349373

Baileya is a scientific journal of horticultural taxonomy, published quarterly by the Liberty Hyde Bailey Hortorium (Cornell University). The journal was established in 1953, but is currently inactive. Its name honors the late Liberty Hyde Bailey.

== Volumes ==
Baileya's first volume was published in March, 1953. Thereafter, volumes 2-15 were published regularly, over consecutive years, from 1954 to 1967. Volumes 16-26 (26 was the last volume), however, were published irregularly from 1968 to 1996.
