= Carvalho =

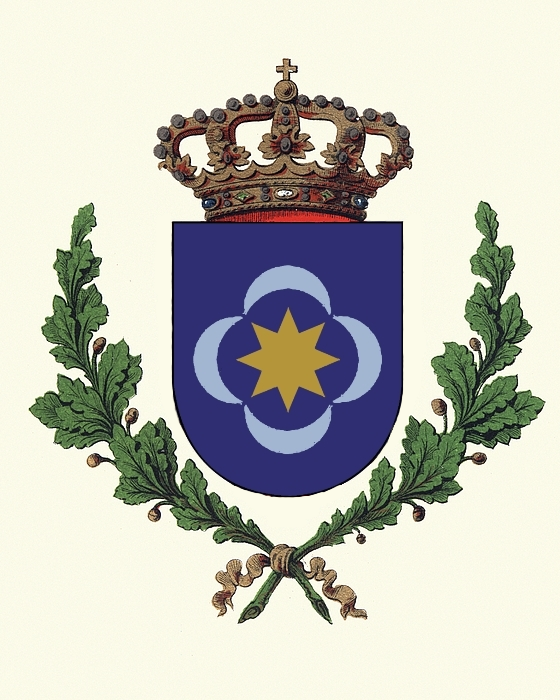
- The coat of arms of the Carvalho
- Pronunciation: Portuguese: [kɐɾˈvaʎu]
- Language: Portuguese

Origin
- Origin: uncertain
- Meaning: 'oak'

Other names
- Variant forms: Carvallo, Cravalho
- Related names: Carballo

Carvalho is a Portuguese surname. Origin: likely a Celtic toponymic name, from (s)kerb(h)/karb (hard, twisted).

The surname is most common in Portugal, Brazil, Galicia (although in Galicia it may be spelled Carballo or Carvallo), the former Portuguese African colonies (Angola, Mozambique, etc.), people from the State of Goa, Vasai, a town to the north of Mumbai in India, and also found in the Americas and Asia-Pacific, in some people of Portuguese ancestry.

== People ==
- Alan Carvalho, Brazilian footballer
- Alexandre Herculano de Carvalho e Araújo, Portuguese historian, 19th century
- Alice Carvalho (born 1996), Brazilian actress, screenwriter and singer
- Amauri Carvalho de Oliveira, Brazilian football player
- Ana Carvalho, Portuguese politician (Volt)
- Ana Maria Carvalho, Brazilian-American professor of Spanish and Portuguese at the University of Arizona
- Antonio Carvalho, Canadian mixed martial artist
- António Carvalho (cyclist), Portuguese cyclist
- António Inocêncio Moreira de Carvalho (1894–1942), Portuguese military officer
- Arnaldo Vieira de Carvalho (1867–1920), Brazilian physician
- Auliʻi Cravalho, American actress and singer
- Beth Carvalho, Brazilian singer
- Brennen Carvalho, American football player
- Bruno Carvalho (disambiguation), several people
- Charlene de Carvalho-Heineken, American-born Dutch heiress
- Daniel da Cruz Carvalho, Portuguese football player
- Daniel da Silva Carvalho, Brazilian football player
- David Nunes Carvalho, American handwriting expert
- Dennis Carvalho (1947–2026), Brazilian television director, actor and voice actor
- Edgar Patricio de Carvalho Pacheco, Angolan football player
- Edílson Pereira de Carvalho, Brazilian football referee
- Eleazar de Carvalho, Brazilian music conductor
- Emanuel Nunes Carvalho, American rabbi, 18th century
- Evandro Carvalho, American politician
- Evaristo Carvalho (1941–2022), São Tomé and Príncipe prime minister
- Felipe Carvalho, Uruguayan football player
- Flávio de Carvalho (1899–1973), Brazilian architect and artist
- Flávio de Carvalho Jr., Brazilian chess master
- Gracie Carvalho, Brazilian model
- Graciella Carvalho (born 1985), Brazilian beauty contest winner
- Gui Carvalho, Brazilian basketball player
- Isabel Carvalho (born 1977), Portuguese artist, writer, editor and printer
- Januario Antonio de Carvalho, Hong Kong official, 19th century
- Jaqueline Carvalho, Brazilian volleyball player
- João de Sousa Carvalho, Portuguese composer, 18th century
- Joaquim Carvalho, Portuguese soccer player
- José Cândido Carvalho, Brazilian writer
- Karina Carvalho, Australian TV news anchor
- Laura de Carvalho Rizzotto aka Laura Rizzotto, Latvian-Brazilian musician
- Léon Carvalho, French impresario and stage director
- Leticia Carvalho (born 1973), Brazilian oceanographer and international civil servant
- Lígia Maria de Abreu Carvalho (1957–1993), Brazilian chess master
- Luiz Carvalho, Brazilian breaststroke swimmer
- Luís Cláudio Carvalho da Silva, Brazilian footballer
- Luiz Fernando Carvalho, Brazilian director
- Maria das Graças Carvalho Dantas, Brazilian-Spanish politician
- Manuel Carvalho da Silva, coordinator of the General Confederation of the Portuguese Workers
- Mariana Carvalho (politician, born 1994), Brazilian politician
- Marie Caroline Miolan-Carvalho, French operatic soprano
- Michel de Carvalho, husband of Charlene de Carvalho-Heineken
- Mordecai Baruch Carvalho, Tunisian rabbi
- Nádia Carvalho (1955–2022), Brazilian actress and voice actress
- Otelo Saraiva de Carvalho, Portuguese military officer
- Paulo de Carvalho, Portuguese singer
- Pedro Carvalho (rugby union), Portuguese rugby union player
- Pedro Carvalho (actor), Portuguese actor
- Peter Carvalho, Indian football player
- Renata Carvalho, Brazilian actress, playwright and theater director
- Ricardo Carvalho, Portuguese football player
- Ricardo Carvalho Calero, Galician professor
- Roger Carvalho, Brazilian footballer
- Ronald de Carvalho, Brazilian poet and diplomat
- Scheila Carvalho, Brazilian dancer and model
- Sebastião de Melo, Marquis of Pombal, Portuguese statesman
- Solomon Nunes Carvalho, American painter and photographer
- Taynara Melo de Carvalho as Tay Melo, Brazilian professional wrestler
- Victor Caetano (born 1997), Brazilian footballer
- William Carvalho, Portuguese professional footballer

== Other ==
- Mr Joe B. Carvalho, Indian film
- Pepe Carvalho, fictional private detective in the novels of Manuel Vázquez Montalbán

== See also ==
- Carballo (disambiguation)
- Carvalhoi (disambiguation)
