= Carballo (disambiguation) =

Carballo may refer to:

In people:

- Carballo (name), the family name Carballo
- Diego de Souza Carballo, a Uruguayan footballer
- José Rodríguez Carballo, a Spanish Roman Catholic priest
- Julio Adalberto Rivera Carballo, was president of El Salvador
- Manuel Carballo (epidemiologist), epidemiologist
- Manuel Carballo (gymnast) (born 1982), Spanish artistic gymnast
- Marcelo Carballo, a Bolivian football defender
- María Elena Carballo, the Minister of Youth and Culture in Costa Rica
- Miguel Ángel Carballo, an Argentine professional golfer
- Pablo Marcos Carballo, an Argentine Air Force Air Commodore
- Ramiro Carballo, a Salvadoran professional soccer player
- Carlos Velasco Carballo, (born 16 March 1971) is a Spanish professional football referee
- Jesus Carballo, (born 26 November 1976) Spanish former gymnast who competed in the 1996 Summer Olympics and again in 2004
- Néstor Carballo, a Uruguayan football defender for Uruguay in the 1954 FIFA World Cup
- Ramiro Carballo,(March 1978) Salvadoran professional football player for the Salvadoran Premier League.
- Marcelo Carballo,(December, 1974) Bolivian football defender playing for first division club Wilstermann
- Héctor Federico Carballo,(March, 1980) Argentine footballer currently playing for CA Mitre in Argentina.
- Ezequiel Carballo,(November, 1989) is an Argentine footballer currently playing as a striker.
- Hugo Carballo,(April, 1944) Chilean footballer who played for clubs of Argentina and Chile.

In places:

- Carballo, a municipality in the Province of A Coruña, Spain
- Carballo (Narcea), a civil parish in Asturias, Spain

In music:

- Carballo, the name of the closing track of the Everything Is Green album by New York band The Essex Green
