= Carballo (name) =

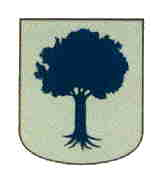
Carballo Family Seal

Carballo is a Galician, Spanish, Catalan and Basque surname, originating from the Galician and Portuguese words for oak. It references the family's settlements surroundings of forest on mountainous terrain in Carballo, Galicia, northwestern Spain. Over the years, the surname has become more frequent in other countries, and the name has had variations in its spelling. It became widely renowned in the early 1600s in the Spanish colonization of the Americas or New Spain and greatly expanded during the 1800s. It spread from South America, Central America, Mexico, and North America, also including the Philippine Islands, Cuba, and Puerto Rico, territories of Spanish Colonialism or colonial expansion under the Crown of Castile during Spanish holdings in the Age of Discovery.

== Etymology ==
Carballo has many variations in its spelling, including Carvallo, Carbello, Carvalho, Carbalho, Caraballo, Carbajo, Carvajal, Caballer, Caballe, Carballino, partly because of illiteracy in early times. Surnames like Carballo transform their pronunciation and spelling as they travel across villages, family branches, and countries. In times when literacy was uncommon, names such as Carballo were written down based on their pronunciation when people's names were written in government records. This could have led to misspellings of Carballo. Researching the misspellings and alternate spellings of the Carballo last name is vital to understanding the possible origins of the name.

Some of the first spelling variations for the origins of the old name Carballo were found in the County of Castile in medieval Spain. While the patronymic and metronymic surnames, which are derived from the name of the father and mother, respectively, are the most common form of a hereditary surname in Spain, occupational surnames also emerge during the late Middle Ages. Many people, such as the Carballo family, adopted the name of their occupation as their surname. The surname Carballo was an occupational name for a knight or a knight's servant.

== Carballo family ==
The name Carballo is documented as far back as 759 AD to Avilense Carballo alongside Morales, and Sebastian recorded by "Menendez Valdez, Miriano". There was a religious crusade with the Archbishop of Spain, the King of Spain and the country of Italy. The first records found are of the early 16th century, starting with a military captain in the Spanish royal navy who was made Marquis for his leadership in a Spanish war. His name is Ferdinand Carballo.

== Discoverers and voyagers ==
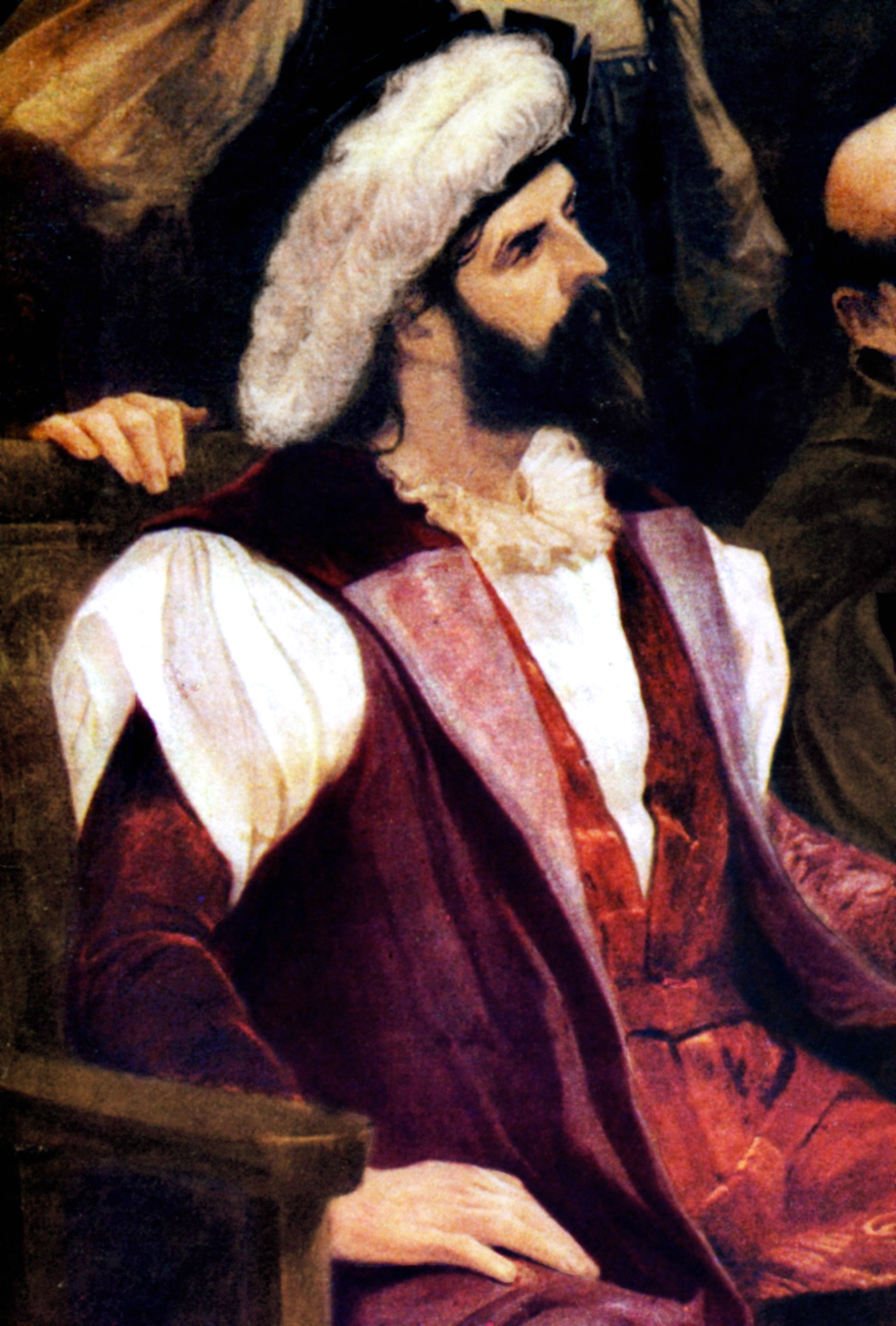
Pedro Álvares Cabral (1468–1520)

The Carballo family began its travel to the Americas about the same time as Christopher Columbus. Some of the first Spanish voyagers and or settlers of this family name or its variants were among the earliest explorers or Conquistadors of the New World were Juan de Cavallón, a Spanish military captain, who sailed to the Americas in the early 1500s. He claimed the territory of Costa Rica for the Spanish Crown and died in Mexico in 1565. Other early migrants to the New World included Gutierre de Caballos, who sailed to the Americas in 1512.

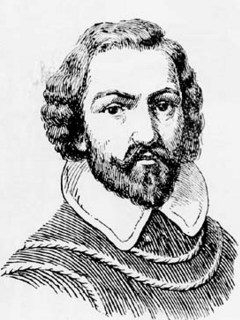
Juan Rodríguez Cabrillo (1499)

Joao Lopez Carvalho, maritime pilot of the ship Concepción, acted as captain-general on May 2, 1521, who took command after Ferdinand Magellan's death in the Philippines (April 27, 1521). Pedro Álvares Cabral (1468–1520) a Portuguese nobleman, military commander, navigator and explorer regarded as the discoverer of Brazil. Cabral conducted the first substantial exploration of the northeast coast of South America and claimed it for Portugal. Juan Rodríguez Cabrillo (1499–1543) was a navigator and explorer known for exploring the west coast of North America on behalf of the Spanish Empire. Cabrillo was the first European explorer to navigate the coast of present-day California in the United States. Port captain at Cádiz, Juan Bautista Topete y Carballo, (May 24, 1821 – October 29, 1885), a Spanish naval commander and politician, born in San Andrés Tuxtla, Mexico. His father and grandfather were also Spanish admirals. Spaniard captain, Rodrigo Flores de Valdez Carballo, (c.1585), Villa de Cangas de Tineo, Principado de Asturias, Kingdom of León.

The motto of the Carballo family is Upwards and Onwards, derived from Spain's Plus Ultra, which translates to "Further Beyond" in Latin.

== The Carvalho and Carvallo families ==
Carvalho
The Portuguese branch of the lineage is traced back to Bartolomeo Domingues de Carvalho', whose son Fernao Gomez de Carvalho was a military officer under the son of King Dinis of Portugal. One of the sons of Fernao, Gil Fernandes de Carvalho, was made a nobleman in Spain as part of the Order of the Caballeros de Santiago.

The coat of arms of the Carvalho family is described as follows: "Three ostrich feathers on top of the navy blue shield. On the navy blue shield, there is one bright golden eight-point star surrounded by eight white crescent moons."

Another important ancestor is Sebastião José de Carvalho e Mello, Marquês de Pombal (1699–1782), a Portuguese statesman who was the virtual ruler of the country during the reign (1750–77) of Joseph Emanuel. Sebastião was born in Lisbon on May 13, 1699, and educated at the University of Coimbra.

In 1738, he was appointed Ambassador to London and seven years later was sent to Vienna in a similar capacity. In 1750, Joseph I of Portugal appointed him minister of state and he soon proved his administrative talents. When the devastating 1755 Lisbon earthquake struck, he organized the relief efforts and planned its rebuilding.

He was made Chief Minister in 1756, and his powers were practically absolute from then on. Sebastião abolished slavery in Portugal, reorganized the educational system, and published a new code of laws. He affected the reorganization of the army, the introduction of new colonists into the Portuguese settlements, and the establishment of an East India Company and other companies for trade with Brazil. Agriculture, commerce, and finances were all improved. The king made him a marquis in 1770. Sebastião's power ended with the death of the king, and he retired to Pombal, Paraíba, where he died on May 8, 1782.

Carvallo
The Carvallo name is the Lusitan form of the Galician name Carballo. Its origin is derived from the name of the place where one lived, or the property owner was from and the founder of the lineage.

Carvallo was taken directly from "Carballo," which was a place in the province of Lugo in Galicia. Hence, someone from that province was someone from Carballo. Carballo comes from the Portuguese word carvalho, which means oak. Therefore, this name means the place where the oaks come from.

In Portugal, Carvalho is also the name of a province in the district of Pe acova, within the Carvalho Mountains. In Spain, during the Reconquista, the name Carballo was extended from Galicia to the Iberian Peninsula and to the Canary Islands.

The spelling of the name Carvallo, with a "v", dates its origins back to Viscaya or the Biscay. During most recent findings, several members of this lineage sailed for the New World in the latter 19th century, arriving in countries like Chile, Argentina, Mexico, the United States, and Venezuela.

The lineage that established itself in Venezuela built roots in Caracas and Valencia. Most of the members of this lineage became businessmen, lawyers, politicians, and economists.

On the branch that settled itself in Valencia, six members have been governors of the city and its state over the last 100 years.

== Sports players ==
- Diego de Souza Carballo, Uruguayan soccer player.
- Manuel Carballo, (1982) Spanish artistic gymnast
- Marcelo Carballo, Bolivian football defender
- Miguel Ángel Carballo, Argentine professional golfer
- Carlos Velasco Carballo, (1971) Spanish professional football referee
- Jesus Carballo, Spanish gymnast, 1996 and 2004 Summer Olympics
- Néstor Carballo, Uruguayan football defender in the 1954 FIFA World Cup
- Marcelo Carballo,(1974) Bolivian football defender
- Héctor Federico Carballo, (1980) Argentine soccer player.
- Ezequiel Carballo, (1989) Argentine soccer player.
- Hugo Carballo, (1944) Chilean soccer player.
- Wendy Carballo (born 2002) Uruguayan professional footballer, played in the 2018 South American U-17 Women's Championship
- Ramiro Carballo Salvadoran footballer, (born 1978) Five FIFA World Cup qualification matches and played at the 2007 CONCACAF Gold Cup
- Javier López Carballo (born 2002) Spanish professional footballer Deportivo Alavés
- Ignacio Pedro Moreno Carballo, (1951) football player for Spain's La Liga
- Leandro Carballo, baseball pitcher, 1987 California Angels.
- Andy Carballo, baseball pitcher, 2007 Metropolitanos de La Habana
- Michael Victor Carballo, baseball outfielder – 2013 Great Falls Voyagers
- Gary Carballo, baseball player, third basemen – Baseball City Royals, 1992
- Jose Carballo, (1994) first base/catcher- Bethune-Cookman Wildcats
- Enrique Carballo,(1980) baseball pitcher, 1998 AZL México Stars
- Julio Carballo, (1968) baseball shortstop, 1990 Northwest League
- Pablo Juan Carballo, (1958) baseball 1st/3rd baseman/outfielder,1978 New York-Pennsylvania League
- Valeria Carballo, open race car driver, Venezuelan, EuroFormula 2011
- Carvalho Leite (1912–2004), Brazilian soccer player.
- Ricardo Carvalho (1978), Portuguese soccer player. AS Monaco in Ligue 1, played central defense.
- Kléber de Carvalho Corrêa (born 1980), Brazilian soccer player.
- Daniel da Silva Carvalho (born 1983), Brazilian soccer player.
- Alan Carvalho (born 1989), Brazilian soccer player.
- Carvalho Leite (1912–2004), Brazilian soccer player
- Fernando Carvallo (born 1948), Chilean soccer player and technical director
- José Carvallo (born 1986), Peruvian soccer player
- Aníbal Carvallo (born 1990), Chilean soccer player

== Other notable Carballo's ==
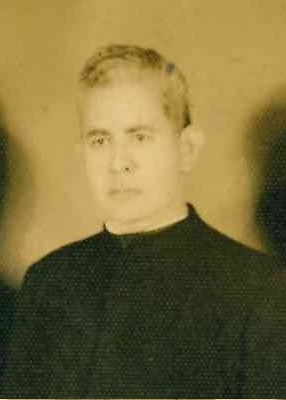
Salomón Carballo

- The first Lord of Carballo, Don Pedro Alvarez de Carballo, captain general Alcazar
- Adolfo Cesar Carballo, (d-, April 10, 2004) army specialist, served Operation Iraqi Freedom, 1st Battalion, 21st Field Artillery Regiment, 1st Cavalry Division, Fort Hood, Texas
- Bishop Salomón Carballo, (1949) director of the Salesians College of San Juan Bosco El Salvador
- María Elena Carballo, Costa Rican politician
- Manuel Carballo, (1941) epidemiologist, executive director of the International Centre for Migration, Health and Development, New York City.
- Anthony P. "Tex" Carballo, (April 17, 2016) served in the US Navy, Korean War
- Henry Edwin Carballo, (December 12, 2025) served in the US Army Vietnam War

== Other spellings ==
Carvalho

- 2nd Marquês de Pombal, Henrique José de Carvalho e Melo (1748–1812)
- Delfim Carlos de Carvalho (1823–1896), Brazilian military.
- Otelo Saraiva de Carvalho (1936–2021), Portugal infantry lieutenant colonel and veteran of the war in Angola,
- Beth Carvalho (born 1946), Brazilian singer
- Paulo de Carvalho (born 1947), Portuguese singer.
- Mônica Carvalho (born 1971), actress and former Brazilian model

Carvallo

- Vicente Carvallo y Goyeneche (1742–1816), Chilean writer and military.
- Delfín Carvallo (1844–1882), lieutenant colonel in Chilean army, fought in the war against Spain, the Arauco War and the Pacific War.
- Andrés Héctor Carvallo (1862–1934), President of the Republic of Paraguay
- Pilar Carvallo (c. 1950-), Chilean geneticist.
- Bernardino Piñera Carvallo (born September 22, 1915) Roman Catholic Archbishop of La Serena

== Gallery ==
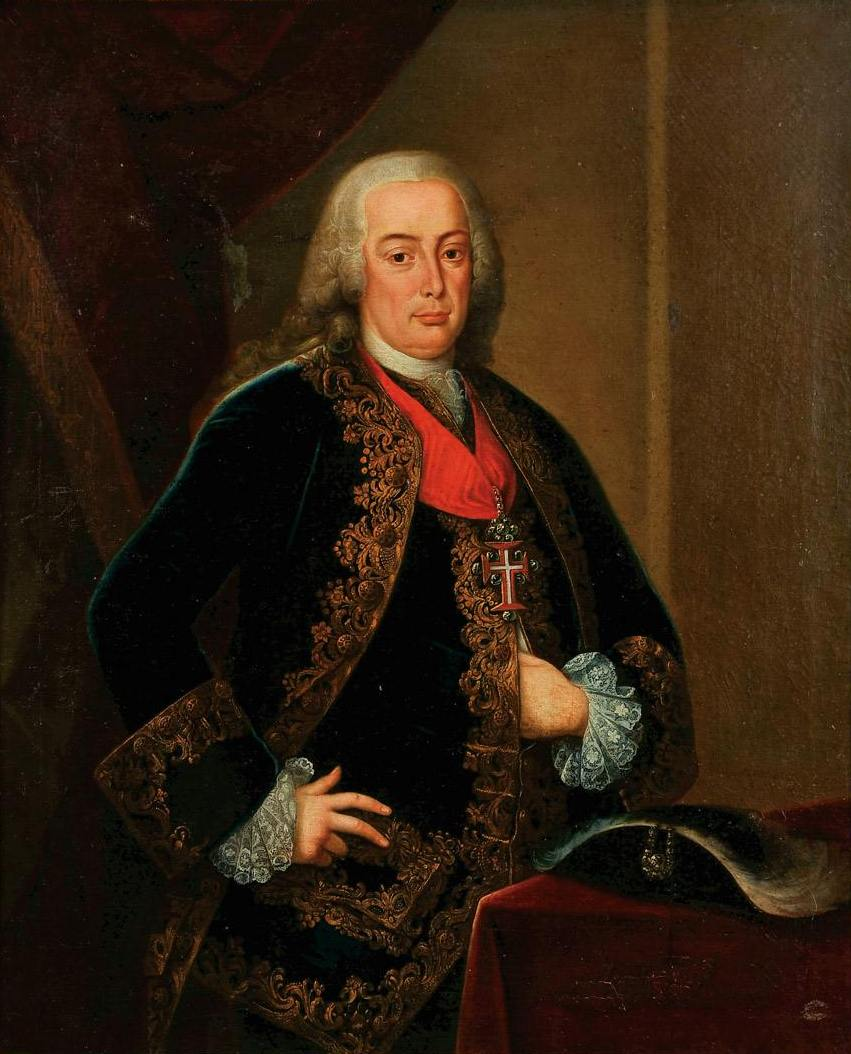
Sebastião José de Carvalho e Melo, 1st Marquis of Pombal, 1st Count of Oeiras (1699–1782)

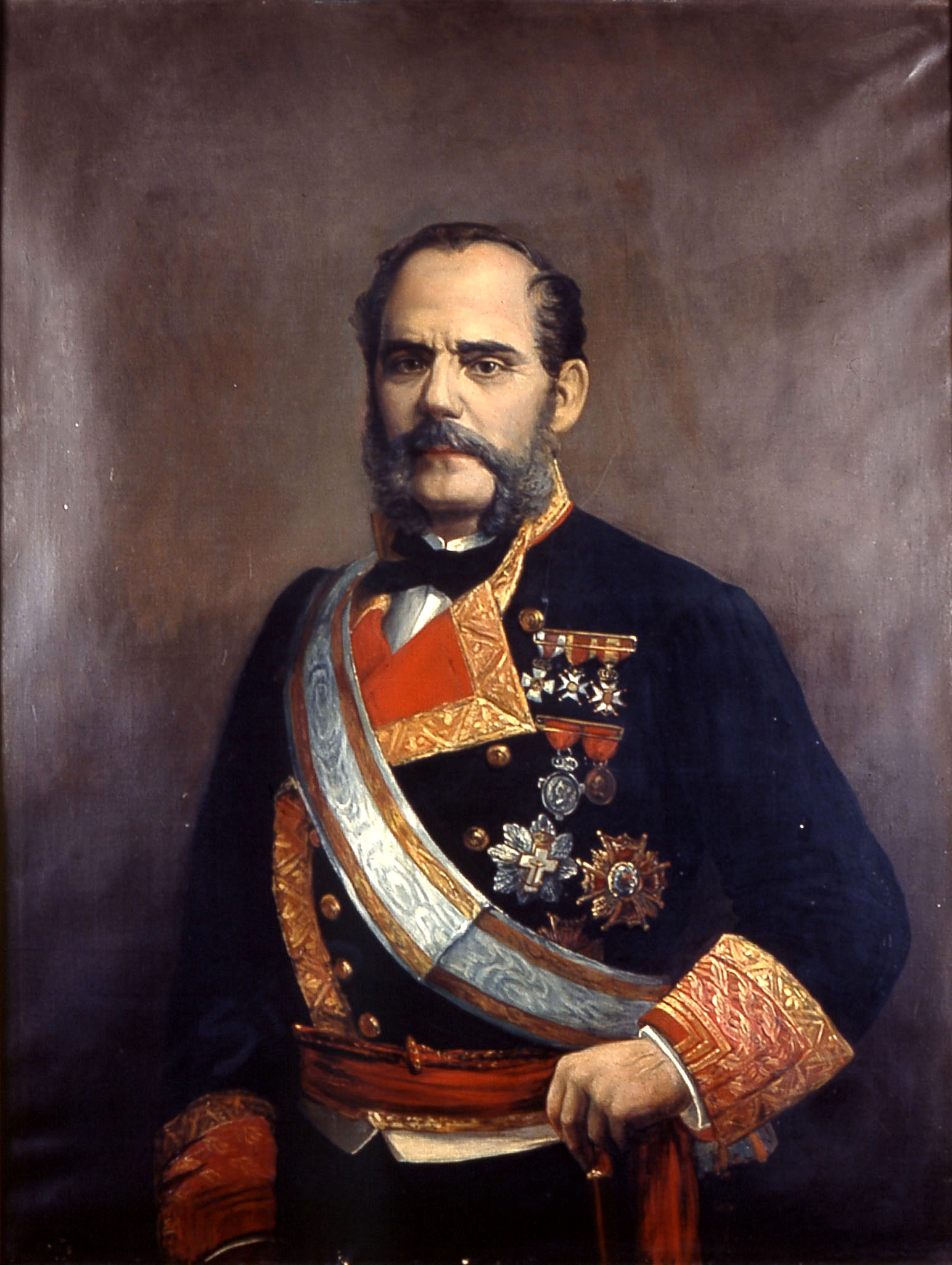
Juan Bautista Topete y Carballo (1821–1885) Spanish naval commander and politician

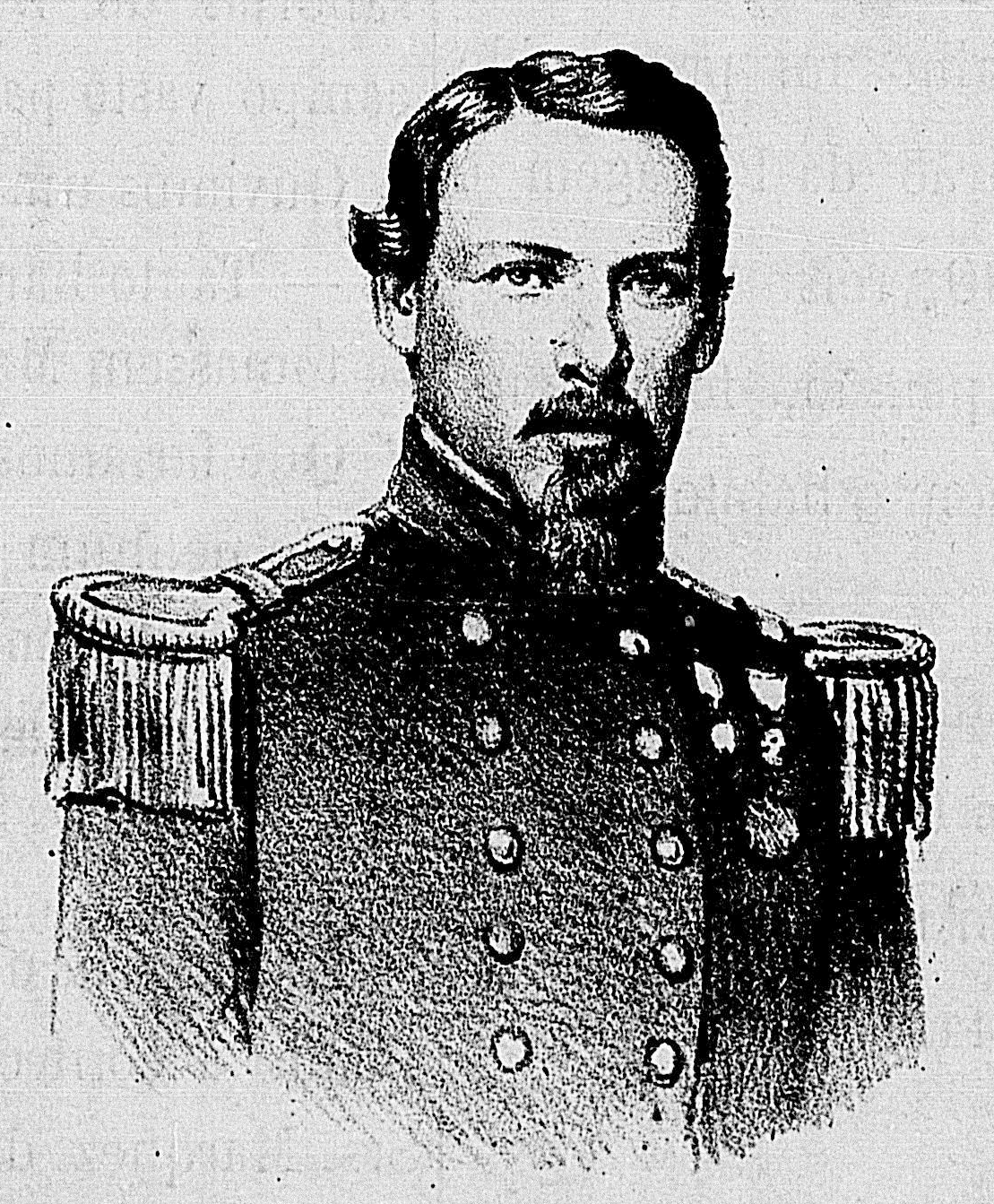
Delfim Carlos de Carvalho, Brazilian admiral who fought in the War of the Triple Alliance (1823–1896)

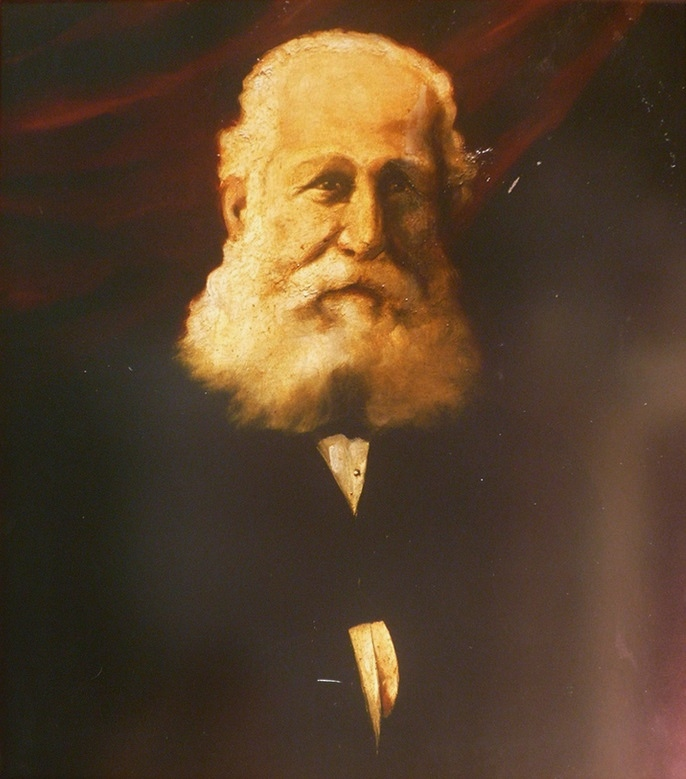
António Augusto Carvalho Monteiro, Brazilian millionaire, collector and bibliophile (1848–1920)

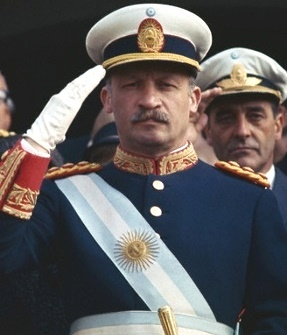
Juan Carlos Onganía Carballo, President of the Republic of Argentina (1966–1970)

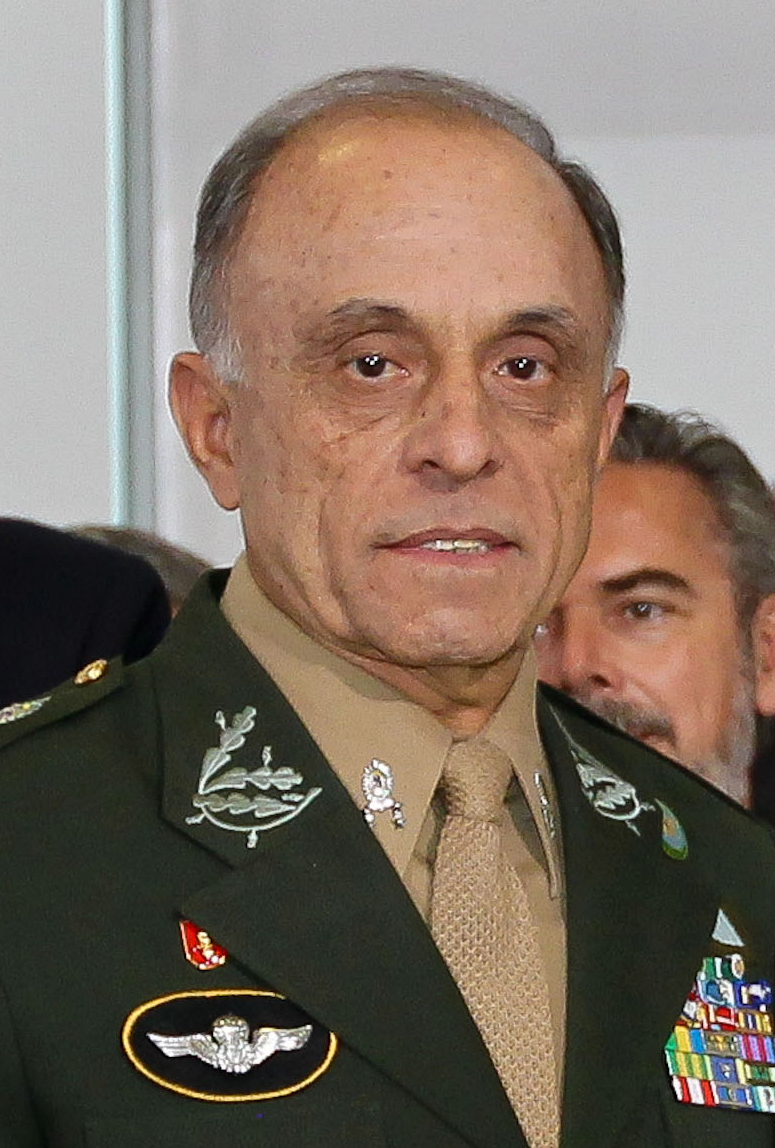
Army General José Elito Carvalho Siqueira, Present Chief of the Institutional Security Cabinet of Brazil

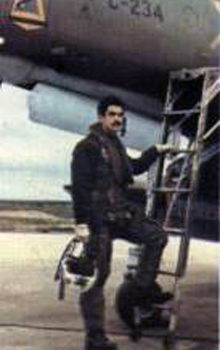
Argentine Air Force captain Pablo Carballo, awarded with the Argentine Nation to the Heroic Valour in Combat Cross (1982)

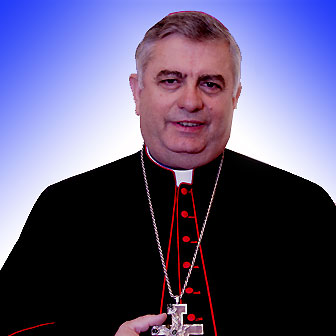
Archbishop José Rodríguez Carballo, OFM, Institutes of Consecrated Life and Societies(2013)

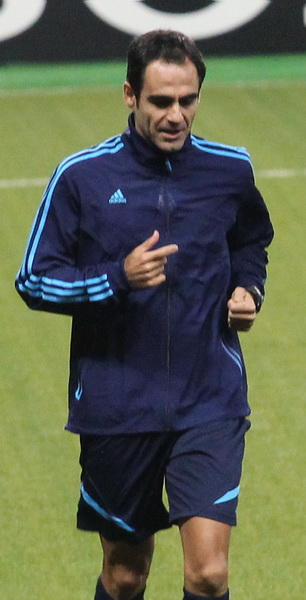
Carlos Velasco Carballo (born 1971) Spanish professional football referee

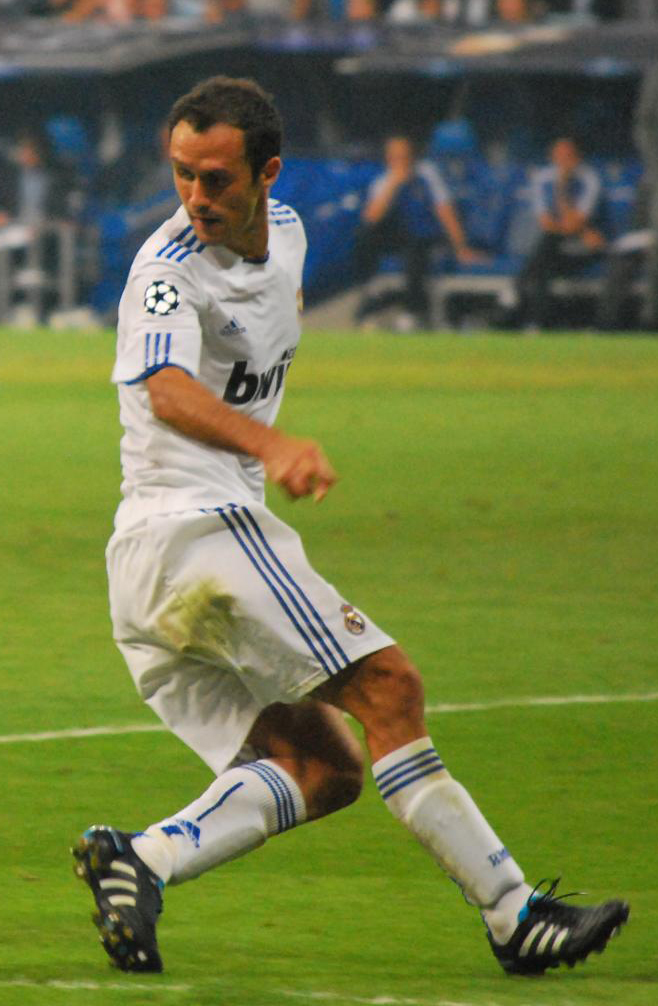
Ricardo Carvalho, Portuguese footballer, Monaco in Ligue 1, central defense

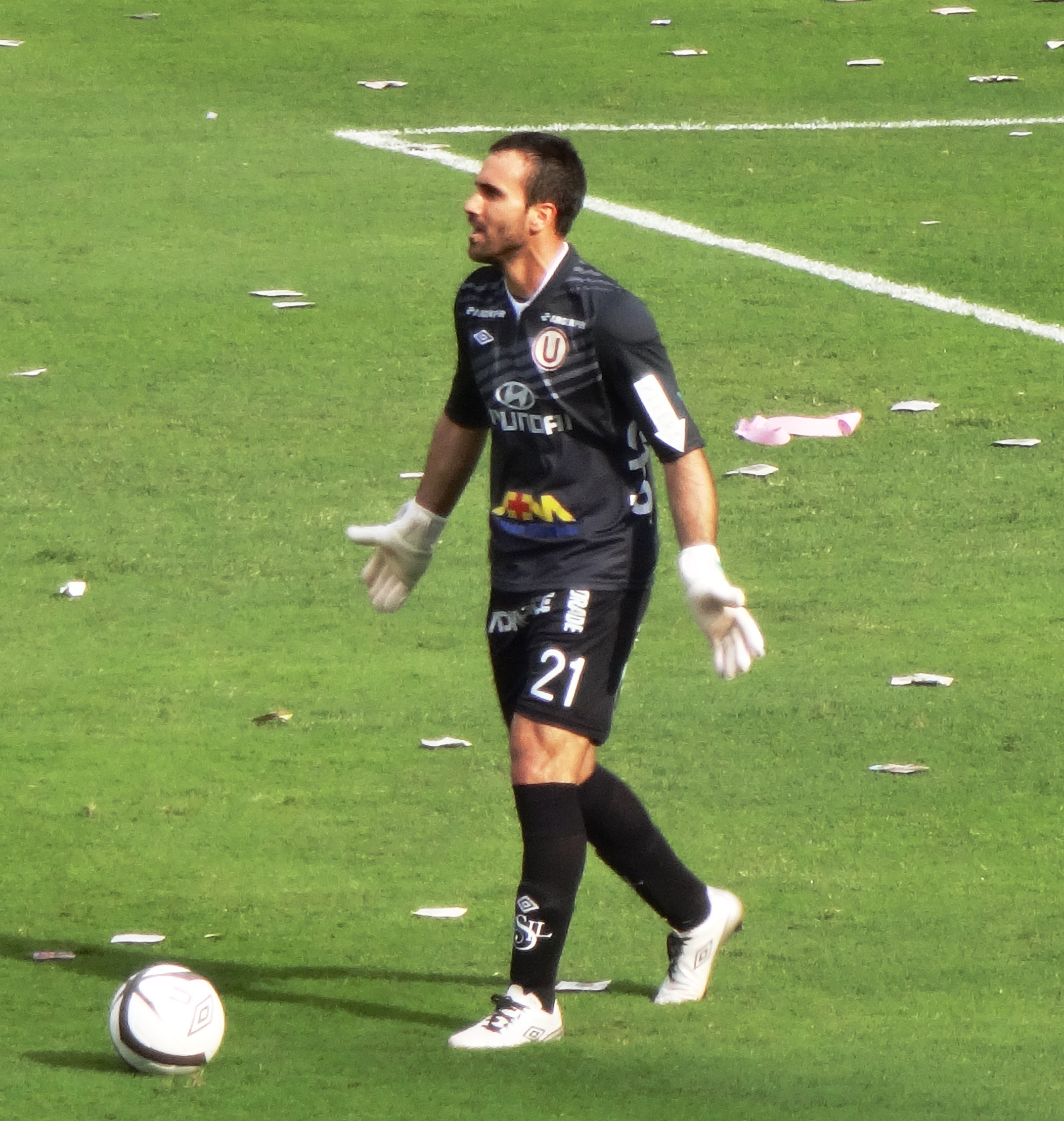
José Carvallo (1986), Peruvian goalkeeper. 2nd. playoff 2013

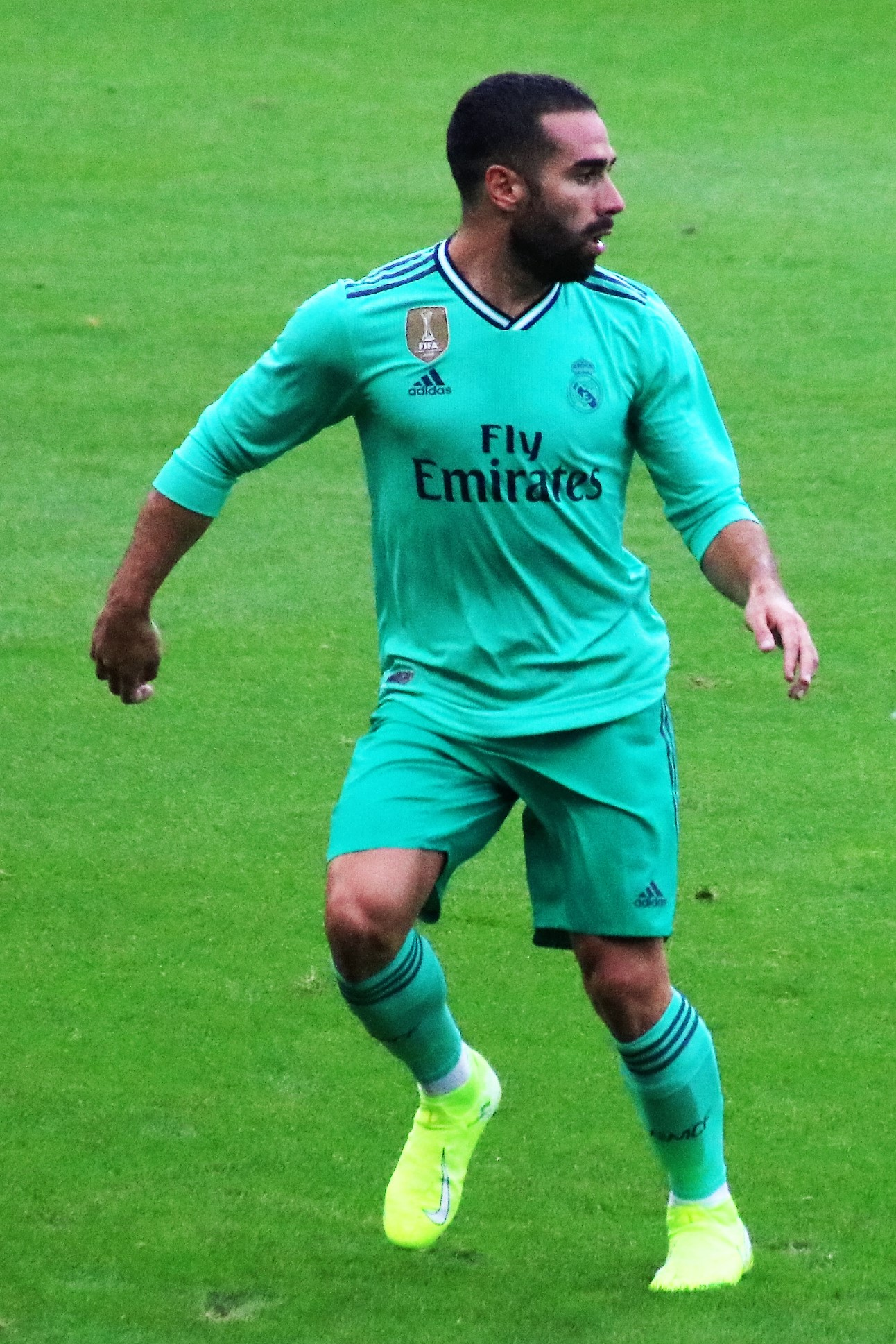
Dani Carvajal, Spanish footballer, Real Madrid right-back wing

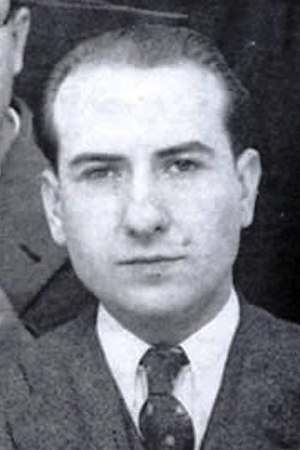
Ricardo Carballo (1910–1990), Spanish philologist and Professor University of Santiago de Compostela

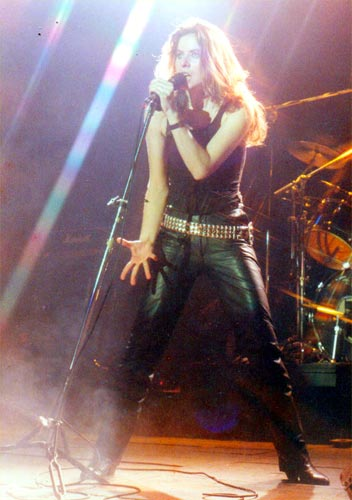
Celeste Carballo (born 1956) Argentine singer-songwriter in rock, blues, hard rock, punk

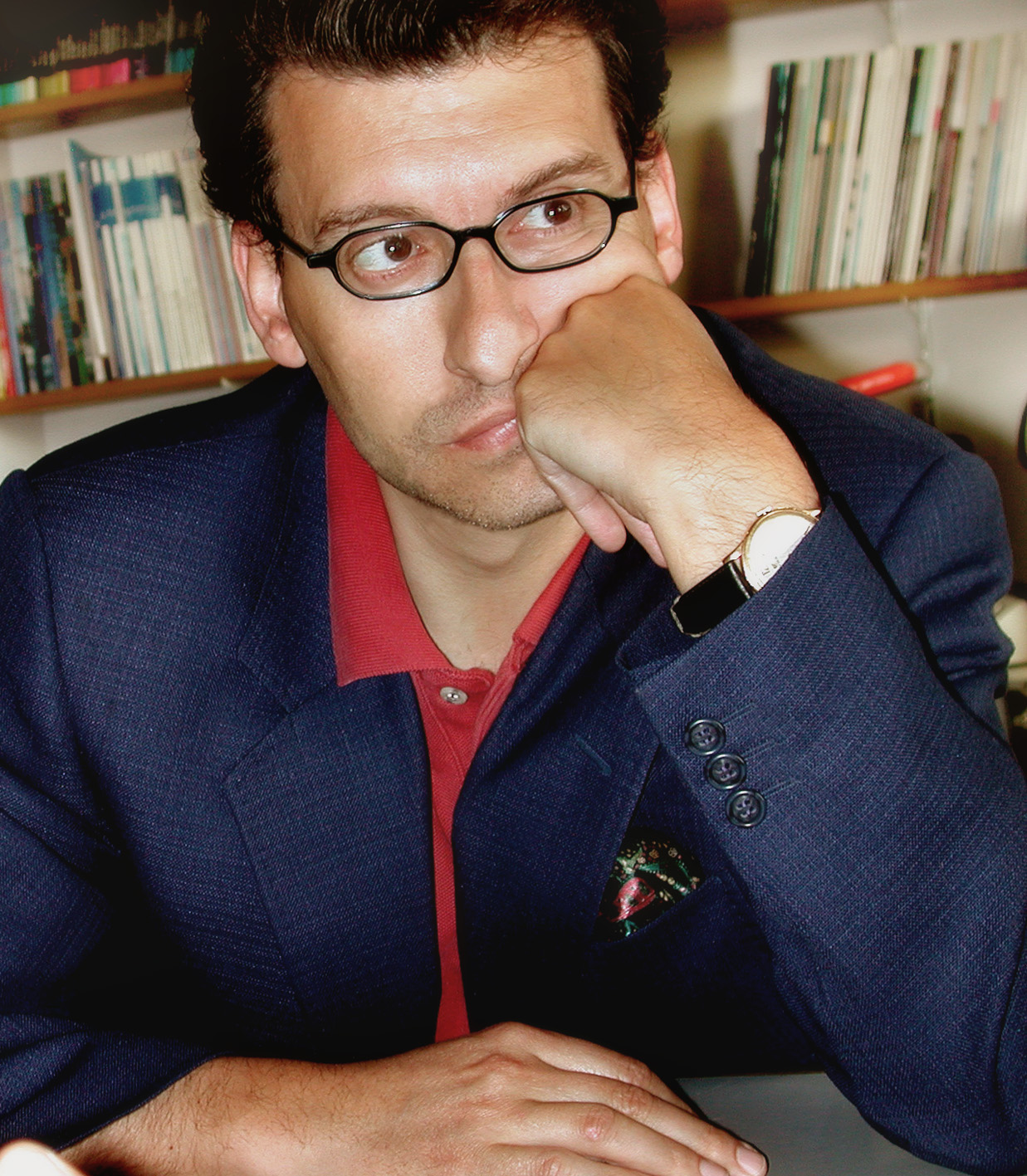
Javier Carballo (born 1961) Spanish entrepreneur, developed children's theme park Micropolix 2004

== Historical timeline for migration and military veteran burials ==
Travels

- From 1820 to 1948, most Carballo immigrants to the U.S. came from Spain, Cuba, and Puerto Rico.
- 1914–1918 World War I: 49 Carballo draft registrants, with most registering in New York City.
- 1920: 44 Carballo households, 29% owned a home. 83.3% of the homeowners and 60% of home renters were literate.
- 1939–1945 World War II: 13 Carballo soldiers joined the U.S. Army

Military burials

- World War II 1939–1945 5 burials observed
- Korean War 1950–1953 3 burials observed
- Vietnam War 1961–1973 2 burials observed
- Iraqi War 2003–2007 1 burial observed
