= Carvalho (disambiguation) =

Carvalho is a Portuguese surname.

Carvalho may also refer to:

- Carvalho (Penacova), civil parish in Portugal
- Karvalo, Kannada novel published as Carvalho in English
- Carvalho (crater), crater on Mercury
- Carvalho (footballer) (born 1952), Brazilian footballer

== See also ==
- Carballo (disambiguation)
- Carvalhoi (disambiguation)
