= Cannibal Sea =

Studio album by The Essex Green
- Released: 2006
- Genre: Indie pop
- Label: Merge Records

The Essex Green chronology
The Long Goodbye (2003)	Cannibal Sea (2006)	Hardly Electronic (2018)

Cannibal Sea is the third album by indie rock band The Essex Green. It was released in March 2006 by Merge Records.

== Background ==
Essex Green formed in 1997 in New York City. A part of The Elephant Six Collective, they released an EP and their debut album on Kindercore Records, followed by a second album, The Long Goodbye on Merge Records in 2003. Cannibal Sea was recorded in a number of studios, including producer Britt Meyers home studio, and released in April 2006. The cover artwork was designed by Maggie Fost.

== Critical response ==
Professional ratings
Review scores
Source	Rating
Absolutepunk.net	(88%) link
Allmusic	link
Pitchfork Media	(7.2/10) link

Critical reaction to the album was mixed to positive. It currently holds a 78% rating, based on 16 critics' reviews, on the review aggregator site Metacritic, indicating "generally favorable" reviews. Of these, 13 are "positive", whilst 3 are considered "mixed." There are no "negative" reviews of the album. Most positive reviews praise the album for its innovative approach to pop, while criticisms include the fact that it is a bit "mellow," "familiar," and "empty." Nate Dorr of PopMatters wrote that while Cannibal Sea was unlikely to surprise listeners stylistically, it "manages enough variation to keep the tracks from running together," and praised its consistent songwriting and harmony arrangements. Reviewing the album for Slant Magazine, Preston Jones described it as "innocent, faintly psychedelic, and disarmingly melodic," adding that its light indie-pop sound suited the band's strengths. Marc Hogan of Pitchfork rated the album 7.2/10, describing it as a polished set of melodic pop songs drawing on 1960s influences.

== Track listing ==
All tracks written by The Essex Green.

No.	Title	Length
1.	"This Isn't Farmlife"	4:06
2.	"Don't Know Why (You Stay)"	3:26
3.	"Penny and Jack"	2:53
4.	"Snakes in the Grass"	3:33
5.	"Rue de Lis"	3:15
6.	"Cardinal Points"	4:26
7.	"Rabbit"	2:24
8.	"Uniform"	3:22
9.	"The Pride"	3:13
10.	"Sin City"	2:32
11.	"Elsinore"	3:24
12.	"Slope Song"	3:33

== Personnel ==
The following people contributed to Cannibal Sea.

- Chris Ziter – vocals, guitar
- Sasha Bell – vocals, keyboards
- Jeff Baron – guitar
- Brent Arnold – performer
- Kevin Barker – performer
- Britt Meyers – producer, performer
