= José Caraballo =

José Caraballo may refer to:

- José Caraballo (painter) (1930–1992), Puerto Rican painter
- José Caraballo (footballer) (born 1996), Venezuelan footballer
