= Emanuel Nunes Carvalho =

Early American Jewish religious leader and lexicographer

- Born: 1771; London, England
- Died: 1817 (aged 45–46); Philadelphia, Pennsylvania, US

Emanuel Nunes Carvalho (1771, London, England – 1817, Philadelphia, Pennsylvania, US) was an American Jewish religious leader and lexicographer.

== Career ==
Emanuel Nunes Carvalho was born in London, England in 1771. In 1799, Carvalho, whose merchant father had emigrated from Portugal to Amsterdam to Britain, was hired as hazzan for the Jewish community in Bridgetown, Barbados. However, he and his wife, the former Sarah Moreira, found the climate bad for their health, so they sailed to New York in 1806, where he tried to support them by teaching oriental languages. Soon he and one of his merchant brothers, David Nunes Carvalho, immigrated to Charleston, South Carolina.

In 1811, Emanuel Nunes Carvalho became the hazzan of Charleston's Jewish community, as well as ran a Jewish school there and taught Christian clergymen Hebrew. In 1813, he became a naturalized American citizen in Charleston. In 1814, Nunes Carvalho was selected as the hazzan of Philadelphia's Congregation Mikveh Israel, where he served for three years until his death. While in Charleston, he may have owned a slave, but had none in the 1810 census, nor by his death in Philadelphia.

In Philadelphia, Rabbi Nunes Carvalho published A Key to the Hebrew Tongue (Philadelphia, 1815). His A Sermon, preached on Sunday, July 7, 1816, on Occasion of the Death of the Rev. Mr. Gershom Mendes Seixas (Philadelphia, 1816) was the first Jewish sermon printed in the United States.

== Family ==
Carvalho's brother David Nunes Carvalho helped found the first reformed congregation in the United States, the Reformed Society of Israelites, in Charleston in 1825. His nephew, Solomon Nunes Carvalho, was a famous artist, photographer, explorer and inventor. His great-nephew David Nunes Carvalho was an ink, paper and handwriting expert who helped prove the innocence of Alfred Dreyfus.

== Death ==
Carvalho died in Philadelphia, Pennsylvania, in 1817.

== Sources ==
- Goldman, Yosef; Kinsberg, Ari (2006). Hebrew Printing in America 1735-1926: A History and Annotated Bibliography. Brooklyn, New York : Goldman. ISBN 978-1-59975-685-1.
