= The Long Goodbye (The Essex Green album) =

Studio album by The Essex Green
- Released: May 2003
- Recorded: 2002
- Genre: Indie pop
- Length: 38:04
- Label: Merge Records

The Essex Green chronology
Everything Is Green (1999)	The Long Goodbye (2003)	Cannibal Sea (2006)

Professional ratings
Review scores
Source	Rating
AllMusic	4/5 stars
Pitchfork	6.2/10

The Long Goodbye is the second album by indie rock band The Essex Green. It was released in May 2003 on Merge Records.

== Track listing ==
1. "By the Sea"
2. "The Late Great Cassiopia"
3. "Our Lady in Havana"
4. "Lazy May"
5. "Southern States"
6. "Julia"
7. "Old Dominion"
8. "Sorry River"
9. "Chartiers"
10. "Whetherman"
11. "The Boo Hoo Boy"
12. "Berlin"
