= Caraballo =

Caraballo (Spanish pronunciation: [kaɾaˈβaʝo]) is a Spanish surname. Notable people with the surname include:

- Alejandra Caraballo (born 1990 or 1991), American civil rights attorney
- Edward Caraballo (born c. 1961), American photojournalist
- Erwin Caraballo (born 1981), Venezuelan sport wrestler
- Francisco Caraballo (born 1983), Venezuelan baseball player
- José Caraballo (1930–1992), Puerto Rican painter
- Ramon Caraballo (born 1969), Dominican Republic baseball player
- Wilfredo Caraballo (born 1947), Puerto Rican politician

== See also ==
- Caraballo Mountains, mountain range of Luzon, Philippines
