= Javier Carballo =

Spanish entrepreneur

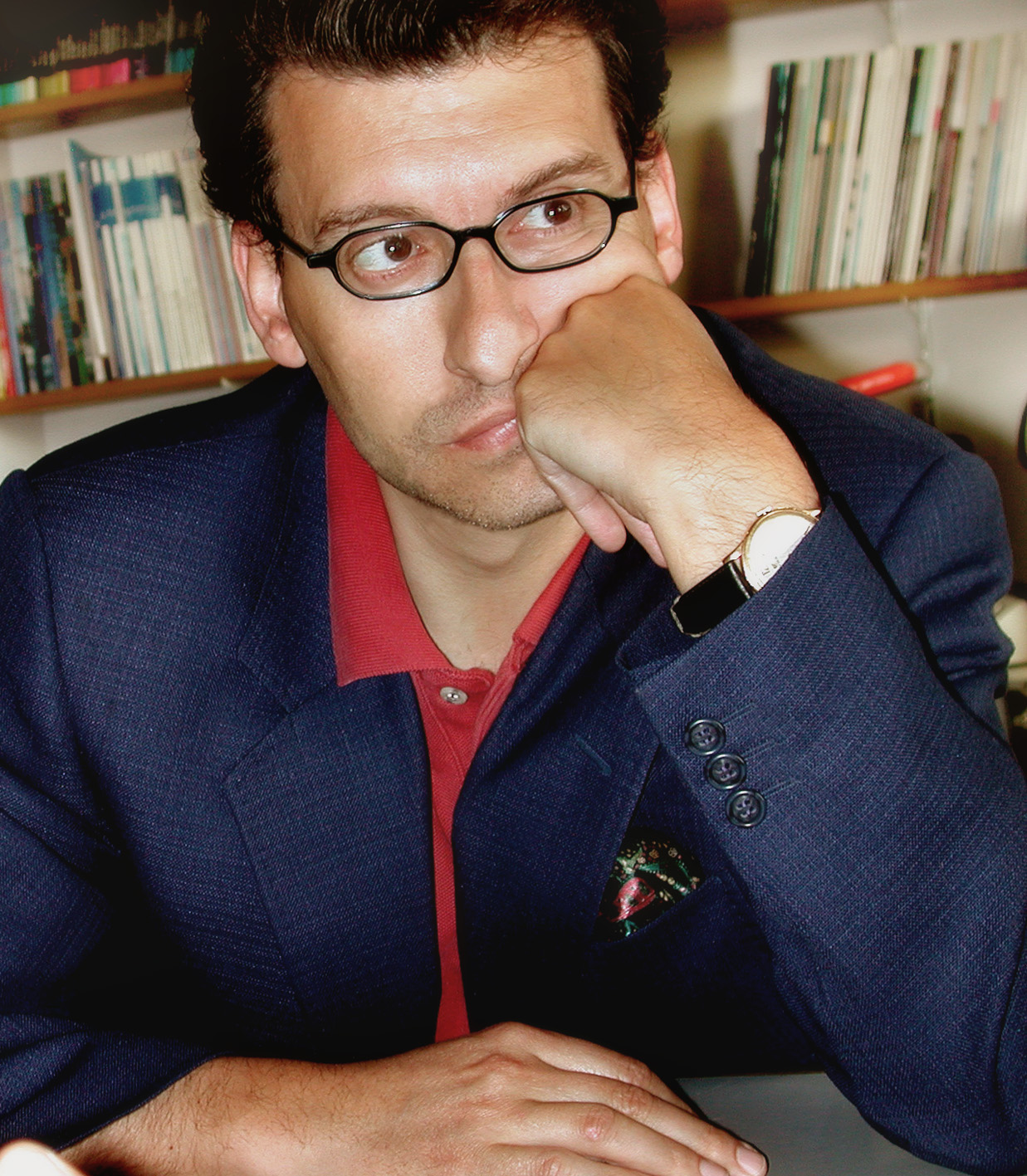
- Javier Carballo in 2008
- Born: 19 August 1961 (age 64); Madrid, Spain
- Occupation: Entrepreneur
- Years active: 1977–date
- Children: 3

Javier Carballo (born 19 August 1961) is a Spanish entrepreneur who has developed his professional career mainly in the new technologies and entertainment sectors.

== Personal life ==
Carballo was born in Madrid on 19 August 1961. He attended secondary school Salesianos of Atocha, also in Madrid. In 1985, he graduated in Marketing and Commerce at ESIC Business & Marketing School, and followed different courses at IESE Business School, in Madrid; at École Supérieure des Sciences Économiques et Commerciales-ESSEC, in Paris; and at University of Michigan.

Having lived in France and the United States, in 1990, Carballo returned to Spain to work in the organization of the Barcelona Olympic Games as Purchasing and Sponsors Director. From 1993, he resides permanently in Madrid though with short professional stays in countries such as China and Mexico. Added to his business activity, he participates in philanthropic activities, is visiting professor at ESIC Business & Marketing School and participates in conferences on innovation and entrepreneurship.

He is the father of three children.

== Business activity ==
Javier Carballo founded several companies in the last 14 years. In 1999 creates Loyalt-eCommerce, Internet portal that will become later the professional services website of the company of telecommunications Vodafone.

In 2004 together with a pool of financial investors founded a company in Madrid to develop a themed park for children called Micropolix. Opened in 1999 by the President of the Community of Madrid Doña Esperanza Aguirre, in its 9400 m2 recreates a real city with all its common occupations (firefighters, police, supermarket, airport, road safety circuit,...). There, children aged 5 to 13 years, play grown-up, understanding how society works and learning at the same time universal values such as tolerance and coexistence. The success of the concept was absolute and only two years after its opening the park had already received over 1,5 million visitors. Since then the park has deserved wide praise to its educational merits. Amid the honors received: "Childhood 2009 Award"; "Protagonist of Education 2012 Award". In 2009 Javier Carballo was awarded with the prestigious "Best Entrepreneur of the Year" and in early 2010 he opted to divest from the company to start new challenges.

== Awards ==
- Accesit to Aster Award (1984)
- Aster Award in the area of Commercial Research (1985)
- Aster Award for Best Entrepreneur of the Year 2009

== Philanthropy ==
Javier Carballo is a member of Rotary International, the largest and oldest humanitarian service organization in the world with one and half million members spread across hundreds of countries, since 1905 contributing to various projects of social improvement. Among them the best known global project: the so-called Polio-Plus program aimed at total eradication of polio. Since its inception in 1985, Rotarians have helped to make this project reach its goal contributing a total of over 500 million dollars and tens of thousands of volunteer man-hours for the inoculation of more than one billion vaccines to children around worthe ld.

== Articles ==
- Es Emocion y es Alma, AESIC Magazine, March 2010
- Oportunidades en el sector del ocio, AESIC Magazine, July 2012
