= Januario Antonio de Carvalho =

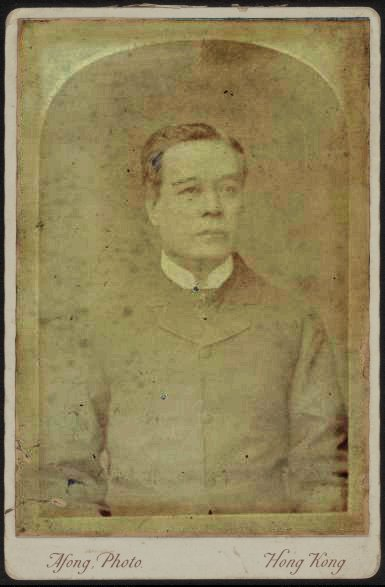
Januario Carvalho by Lai Afong, 1886

Januario Antonio de Carvalho (1830–1900) was a prominent member of the Portuguese community in Hong Kong during the late 19th century. He arrived in Hong Kong from Macao in 1842, and later became the Chief Cashier of the Colonial Treasurer of Hong Kong. On October 7, 1878, he was nominated by the Governor General of Hong Kong John Pope Hennessy to be Colonial Treasurer (with a seat in the Legislative Council of Hong Kong). He would have been the first Portuguese member of the council, but his nomination was met with indignation from the British Home Office, which viewed Carvalho as an "alien" because of his Portuguese descent and thus unsuited for the position. After his rejection, Hennessy appointed Carvalho a Justice of the Peace. Carvalho later petitioned for, and was granted, status as a naturalized British subject on December 28, 1883.

== Family relationships ==
Carvalho married Mariana Joaquina Braga, daughter of another prominent Portuguese family (Braga, originally from Macao) resident in Hong Kong. They had six children: Sarah Maria (b. 1857), Josephina Maria (b. 1858), Maria Pulqueria (b. 1860), Edmundo Arthur (b. 1860), Edith Maria (b. 1862), and Carlos Francisco (b. 1867). Josephina Maria and Maria Pulcheria did not marry.

Sarah married Sr. Rodrigues and had three children, Bernadete Maria Rodrigues, Luis Gonzaga Rodrigues, and Geovanina Maria Rodrigues—all of whom lived and died in Hong Kong.

Edmundo married Clara Evangelina Noronha (granddaughter of Delfino Noronha—owner of the colonial printing press and leader of the Portuguese community in Hong Kong) and later became the Chief Cashier of Hong Kong like his father. As the Second World War approached, Edmundo left Hong Kong for France, and later Portugal. He and Clara had two sons, Robert and Arthur. Robert (Los Angeles) died at the age of 30. Arthur (San Francisco) had three children: George (Pulitzer Prize winning journalist for the San Francisco Chronicle), Virginia (first female photojournalist for the San Francisco Chronicle), and Juanita. Descendants of Robert and Arthur live today in California, Washington State, and Ohio.

Carlos married Guilhermina (Nina) Cabral (daughter of the Colonial Treasurer of Macao) and became director general of the Hong Kong Shanghai Banking Corporation (HSBC), based in Shanghai. Carlos died in 1925 in Hong Kong.

Januario Carvalho's older brother Marcos (1826-1882) owned an estate called Craigengower on Caine Road in Hong Kong, which later became the Craigengower Cricket Club in Happy Valley, Hong Kong.
