= Mariana Carvalho (politician, born 1994) =

Brazilian politician (born 1994)

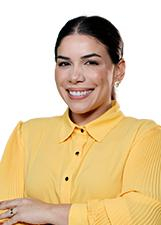
- Carvalho in 2024

Member of the Chamber of Deputies
- Incumbent
- Assumed office 30 November 2023
- Constituency: Maranhão

Personal details
- Born: Tacilla Mariana Carvalho Silva; 2 July 1994 (age 32) Imperatriz, Maranhão, Brazil
- Party: PL (2025–present)
- Other political affiliations: PSL (2018–2020); PSC (2020–2023); PODE (2023); Republicanos (2023–2025)

Tacilla Mariana Carvalho Silva (born 2 July 1994) is a Brazilian politician. From 2023 to 2024, she was a member of the Chamber of Deputies. In the 2020 municipal elections, she was a candidate for mayor of Imperatriz.
