= The Essex Green =

American indie rock band

- Origin: Brooklyn, New York, US
- Genres: Indie rock, indie pop, neo-psychedelia
- Years active: 1997–2007, 2016–present
- Label: Kindercore/Merge/Low Transit Industries
- Members: Jeff Baron; Sasha Bell; Chris Ziter
- Website: essexgreen.com

The Essex Green is an American indie rock band from Brooklyn that has released four albums to date. The band is primarily composed of songwriters Jeff Baron, Sasha Bell and Chris Ziter, and specializes in a classic sound inspired by 1960s–1970s pop and folk in the tradition of bands like the Left Banke and Fairport Convention.

== History ==
The band was formed by members of the Burlington, Vermont, band Guppyboy when Baron, Bell, Ziter and Michael Barrett moved to Brooklyn. The Essex Green formed in 1997, adding drummer Tim Barnes, and began to play shows around New York. They issued a split 7-inch single with the Sixth Great Lake (a Guppyboy/Essex Green-related side project) in 1999. They were asked by Robert Schneider to be a part of the Elephant Six Collective and recorded a self-titled EP, later signing to Kindercore Records, who released their first full-length album later that year. After a number of tours and the release of some EPs and singles, the group signed with Merge Records who released their second album in 2003. After a world tour, they headed back to the studio in fall of 2005 to begin work on their third album, Cannibal Sea, which was released in March 2006. Their fourth album, Hardly Electronic was released in 2018.

== Discography ==
=== Albums ===
- The Brooklyn Basement Tapes Volume One – 1997
- The Brooklyn Basement Tapes Volume Two – 1997
- Everything Is Green – Kindercore/Low Transit Industries – 1999
- The Long Goodbye – Merge Records/Low Transit Industries – 2003
- Cannibal Sea – Merge Records – 2006
- Hardly Electronic – Merge Records – 2018

=== Singles and EPs ===
- Split single with the Sixth Great Lake (7-inch) – Sudden Shame – 1999
- Essex Green EP – Elephant6 – 1999
- Happy Happy Birthday to Me Singles Club: April (7-inch) – HHBTM – 2000
- Split single with the Smallgoods (7-inch) – Low Transit Industries – 2003
