= Solomon Nunes Carvalho =

American painter, photographer, author and inventor

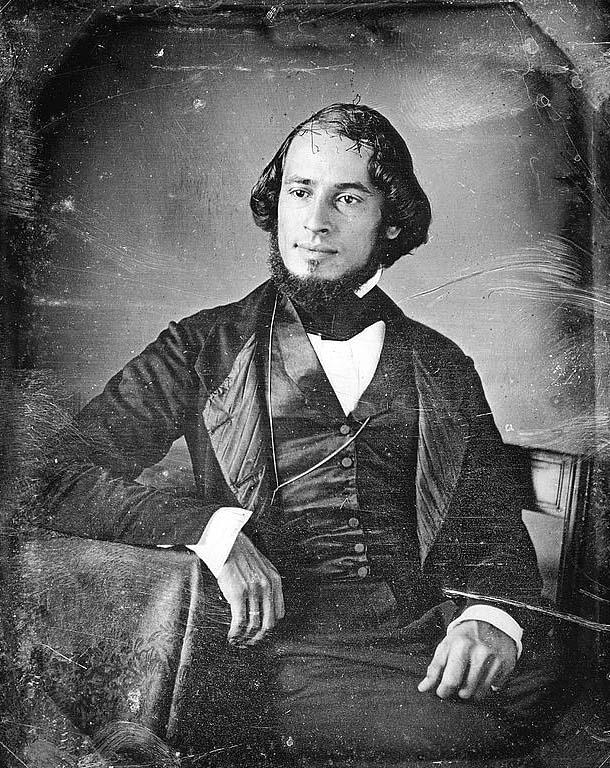
- A portrait of the artist
- Born: 27 April 1815; Charleston, South Carolina, U.S.
- Died: 21 May 1897 (aged 82); Pleasantville, New York, U.S.
- Known for: Photography, exploration
- Children: David

Solomon Nunes Carvalho (April 27, 1815 – May 27, 1897) was an American painter, photographer, author and inventor. He may be best known as an explorer who traveled through the territory of Kansas, Colorado and Utah with John C. Frémont on his fifth expedition. Many famous images of the Old West are based on images he made, although many others have been lost or confused with those taken by Mathew Brady and other contemporaries.

== Early and family life ==
He was born in 1815 in Charleston, South Carolina to Sarah Cohen D'Azevedo and her husband David Nunes Carvalho, who were both born in England to Jewish families of Portuguese descent. He was named after his grandfather (1743-pre-1811), who had escaped persecution in Portugal and lived in Amsterdam before finally settling in Britain, from which his two sons would emigrate to Barbados and then America. This Solomon's father, David Nunes Carvalho would help establish the first Reform Jewish congregation in the United States, the Reformed Society of Israelites, in Charleston in 1825. His brother (Solomon's uncle), Emanuel Nunes Carvalho, was a cantor and rabbi in Barbados, Charleston and Philadelphia, where he died in 1817. By 1840, David Nunes Carvalho had moved his family to Philadelphia, where they lived in Mulberry Ward with a free black servant. According to family tradition, the younger Carvalho studied with Thomas Sully.

Isaac Leeser (1806–1868), hazzan of Congregation K.K. Mikveh Israel married Solomon Nunes Carvalho and Sarah Miriam Solis (1824–1894) on October 15, 1845, in Philadelphia. By 1850 they lived with his father and family in Baltimore, and had a son David and daughter Charity. Solomon Carvalho considered his Jewish identity important as he traveled through the Atlantic coastal states on business. He was a board member of the Philadelphia Hebrew Education Society in 1849–1850. The following year, he became a member of New York's historic Congregation Shearith Israel, in whose cemetery (established that year), he would ultimately be buried. Solomon and his wife Sarah would help found Baltimore's Beth Israel Sephardic synagogue, although it disbanded in 1859. Sarah also founded the Baltimore Hebrew English Sunday School (before financial reasons led the family to relocate to New York City) and a small synagogue in Harlem (the Hand-in-Hand Congregation) in 1870.

== Career ==
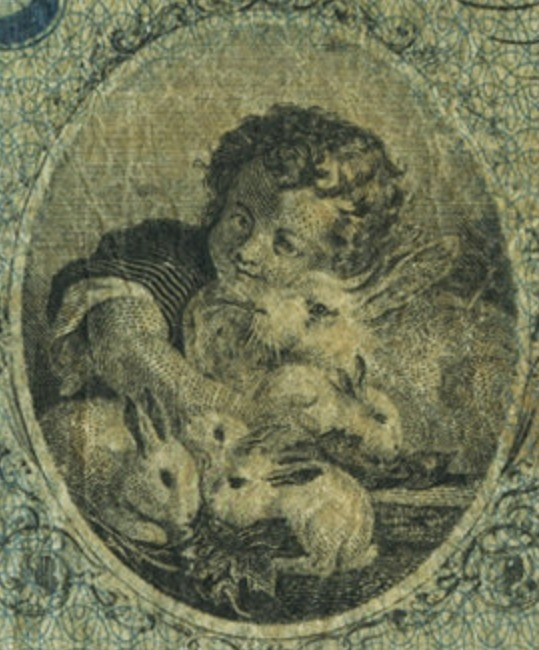
Artistic vignette adapted from the painting, Child with Rabbits by Carvalho

His father had established a workshop in Philadelphia, Pennsylvania by the time Solomon was 19, and another in Baltimore, Maryland by 1849, where both became interested in portrait photography using the daguerreotype method. They also had offices of some type in Charleston, South Carolina and in New York City. A portrait Solomon painted at age 25, "Child with Rabbits" would later be incorporated into national bank notes of several U.S. state banks.

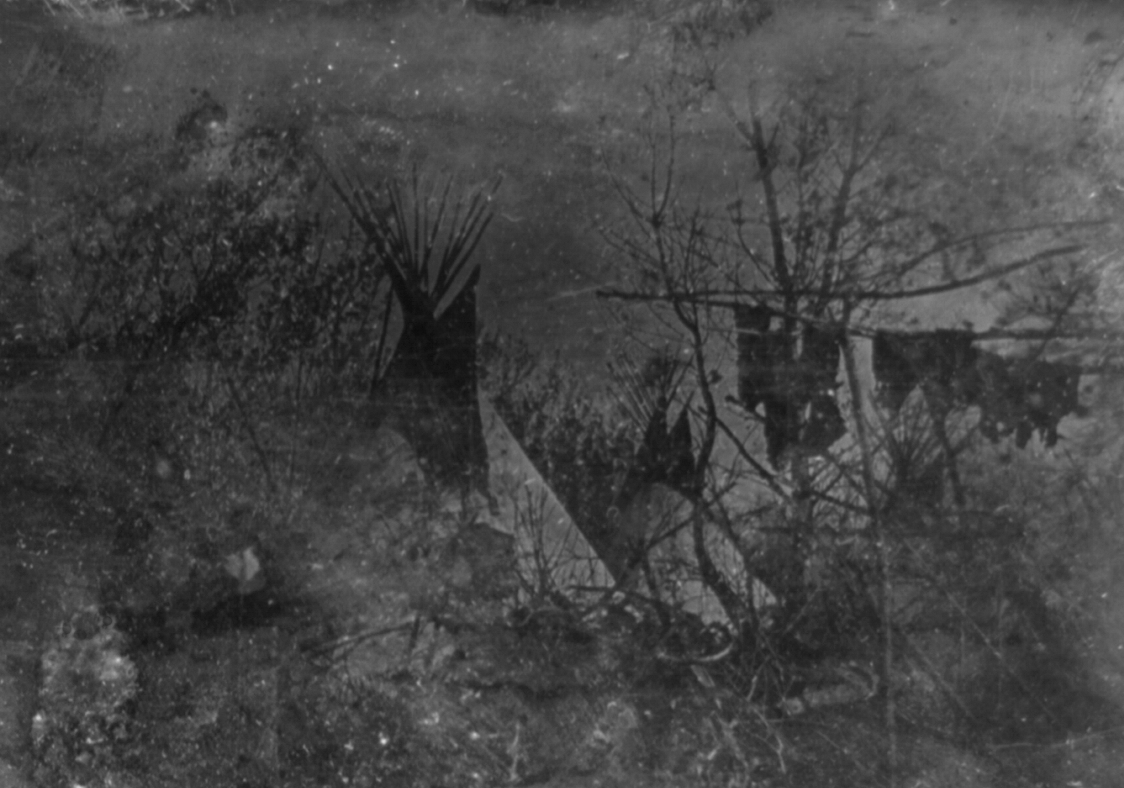
A daguerreotype by Solomon Carvalho of a Plains Indian village in Kansas Territory taken during the Frémont Expedition in 1853

In 1853, Colonel John C. Frémont, who had made several trips exploring the west and had unsuccessfully tried to make daguerreotypes to document his group's journeys, invited the young artist to accompany him as he attempted to prove that a “central route” near the thirty-eighth parallel would be the best path for a planned transcontinental railroad. Accepting the challenge, Carvalho traveled from New York to St. Louis by rail, and then took a steamboat up the Missouri River to Westport in Missouri. During the trip, despite the frigid weather which made chemical combinations difficult, Carvalho made near daily portraits of expedition members, the Native Americans they met, and the landscape. Solomon Carvalho would nearly die on that trip of scurvy, starvation and frostbite, and he and his friend Frederick W. von Egloffstein would be nursed back to health by kindly Mormons in Parowan, Utah and Salt Lake City, as Frémont and several other surviving members would continue to California. Carvalho later recovered enough to reach Los Angeles, California and its small Jewish community, helping them organize the Hebrew Benevolent Society. A major part of his near 300 daguerreotypes taken during the expedition were lost in a fire. The surviving ones would later be given by Fremont to Mathew Brady to copy on wet plate negatives, and they became mixed up with others of Brady's work.

Carvalho published his diary of the five-month journey, Incidents of Travel and Adventure in the Far West; with Colonel Fremont's Last Expedition (1860), possibly before Frémont's presidential campaign or to fulfill a promise made to Mormon leaders during his recuperation.

After the American Civil War, Carvalho moved his family to New York City, but cataracts impaired his continuing portrait work by 1869, and would ultimately blind him. He became an inventor, and two patents he received for steam superheating in 1877 and 1878 would not only win the Medal of Excellence from the American Institute of New York, but achieve financial security for the family. He and Sarah remained active in New York's Jewish community, and he tried to harmonize modern scientific thought and the biblical story of creation found in the book of Genesis in his final years, although that work was never published.

== Death and legacy ==
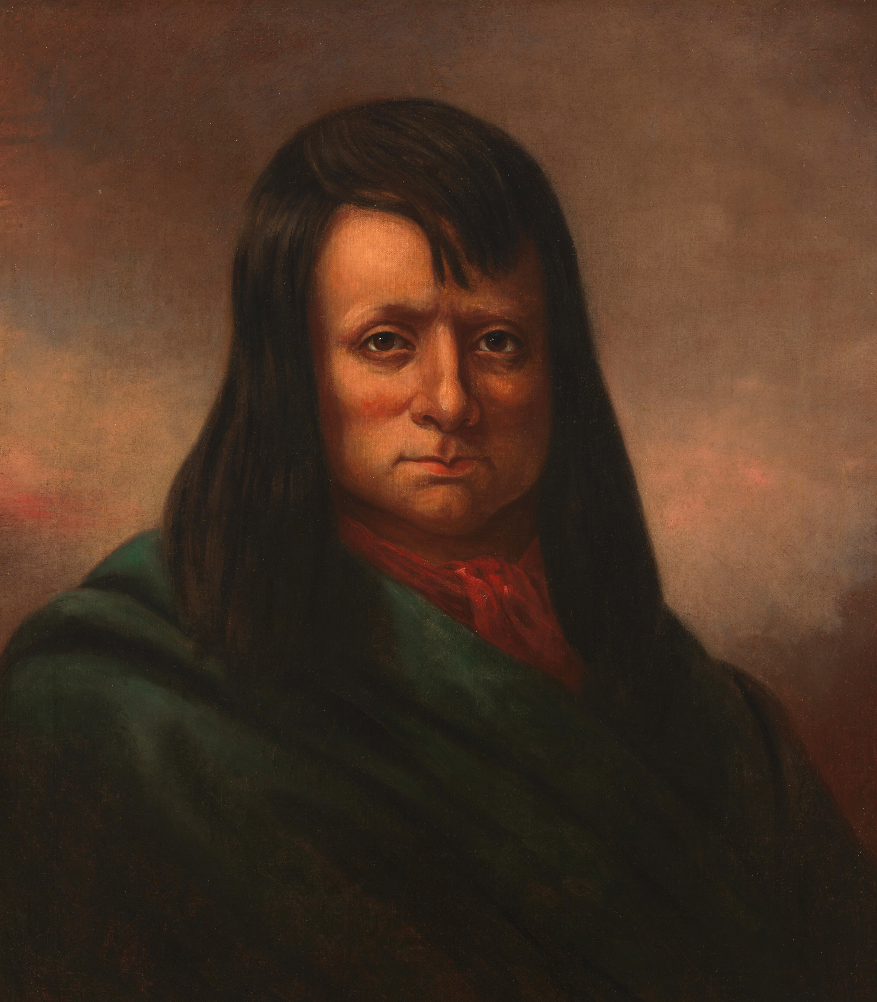
Portrait of the Ute Chief, Walkara, by Carvalho

Solomon Carvalho died in 1897 in Pleasantville, New York.

His son David Nunes Carvalho became a famous paper, ink and handwriting analyst and author, with his forensic work acknowledged by Arthur Conan Doyle, although his testimony at the second trial of Alfred Dreyfus (that Major Esterhazy wrote the treasonous notes) would fail to acquit the accused officer. Carvalho is considered a pioneer in travel photography as were, for example, Francis Bedford, George Wilson Bridges, Maxime Du Camp, and Francis Frith. Carvalho's words, "Emigration is a gate to the Salt Lake Valley, veiled in obscurity, and unknown to the citizens of the United States" – Solomon Carvalho 1852, were memorialized on Emigration Canyon Monument in one of Salt Lake City's parks. A historic marker dedicated to Col. Fremont and Solomon Carvalho's contribution was raised on Wild Horse Butte in Utah.

Filmmaker Steve Rivo made a documentary film entitled Carvalho's Journey, that was released in 2015 and has aired on PBS.
