= António Inocêncio Moreira de Carvalho =

António Inocêncio Moreira de Carvelho

71st Civil Governor of the Autonomous District of Horta
- In office 1 January 1940 – 12 June 1942
- Preceded by: -
- Succeeded by: Joaquim José Gomes Belo
- Constituency: Faial

71st Civil Governor of the District of Horta
- In office 17 March 1939 – 31 December 1940
- Preceded by: José Rodrigues da Silva Mendes
- Succeeded by: -
- Constituency: Faial

Personal details
- Born: António Inocêncio Moreira de Carvelho; 6 January 1894 Lisbon
- Died: 12 September 1942 (aged 48) Lisbon
- Citizenship: Portuguese
- Occupation: Military officer

António Inocêncio Moreira de Carvalho CvA • GOC (Lisbon, 6 January 1894 — Lisbon, 12 September 1942) was a Portuguese military officer, whose military career propelled him into various political positions within the Estado Novo of Portugal, including specifically the Civil Governor of the District of Horta.

== Biography ==
Although born in Lisbon, António de Carvalho was linked by familial descent to the island of Faial.

=== Career ===
He began his military career as a volunteer in 1911, joining the 4th Cavalry Regiment in Lisbon. By 1916 he was promoted to militia ensign, concluding the course in the Practical School of Militia Officers (Portuguese: Escola Prática de Oficiais Milicianos) and participated in classes in the Instituto Industrial e Comercial de Lisboa (Lisbon Industrial and Commercial Institute).

In 1918, during a period in the Guarda Nacional Republicana (National Republican Guard) he was involved in the maintenance of the regime of the First Portuguese Republic, and was promoted by 1919 to the position of lieutenant in the militia.

He became adjunct-to-camp of various generals, and in 1926 became an attaché. Following 1929 he was involved in the Polícia de Segurança Pública commission, and nominated commandant of the police for the District of Setúbal, a position he held from 1 April 1929 to 21 March 1939. During this time he was responsible for repressing labour movements in Setúbal and other localities in the district, particularly in 1939, when he pursued fugitives from the Spanish Civil War. He was decorated for his services and in 1938 he was promoted to captain in the Portuguese Military.

=== Civil Governor ===
For his loyalty to the Estado Novo regime, he was nominated to the position of Civil Governor to the District of Horta after a visit by Marcelo Caetano to the Azores, at the time responsible for elaborating a new political status for the autonomous districts of the Ilhas Adjacentes. By 1940, the districts were transformed into autonomous districts, an privileging the westernmost islands with the administrative autonomy that already existed in the other islands.

He was installed in the position on 17 March 1939, a few months before the outbreak of the Second World War in the Ministry of the Interior, in the presence of Dr. Mário Pais de Sousa. The islands position was central in external politics during this period, to the point that an Expeditionary Corp was sent to secure the sovereignty of Portuguese territory. He arrived on board the packet steamer Carvalho Araújo and received in a formal reception on 29 April.

Of his term as civil governor there is a general consensus that he was a positive successor of the previous politician in the position, as noted in the opinion piece "Dois Homens" (Two Men), M. da Costa Melo:

"...Moreira de Carvalho was a dignified successor to captain Silva Mendes. In his path in Work, Justice and Truth, he completed the work started and completed his own...[accomplishing]...a weighted pacification policy".

His functions as Civil Governor occurred during a period of great change in the administrative district, a period of great social tension and politics that resulted in Horta becoming a strategic point for the submarine cables and a port for international replenishment. This opinion that governor Moreira de Carvalho was a pacificator in a district that lived in a period of tension was reinforced by Dr. José Joaquim Gomes Belo, then rector of the Horta Lyceum, when he took up his post:

"...does not offset the assertion that for this peace [which you can enjoy here now] and who all play an active role, we must not fail to recognize that it was he your great worker. It was he who was able to bring together and give conscience to our desires and to live without hardships that overlapped the saturation and fatigue brought on by struggles woven of a lack of understanding, of injured vanities or malnourished pride."

As Gomes Belo put it, Carvalho' s three years in office were "three years of peace", and that they "require our gratitude", referring to the populace of the district. His term occurred following the outbreak of the Second World War, and Portuguese neutrality meant that Horta acted between Allies and Axis forces (and their forces regularly transited the waters or competed in anti-submarine tactics). At the same time, an influx of Portuguese troops on the islands meant that economic conditions worsened, driving a wedge between locals and continentals. He was able to maintain the peace and stability that allowed President Óscar Carmona to visit the district.

=== Later life ===
Shortly after the President's visit to the district, Moreira do Carvalho began to journey between Lisbon and Terceira due to ailments, which were respectively reported by the local newspapers. By 23 July 1942, he embarked on a Pan American flight with his family for Lisbon, "...searching for the best treatments for his failing health...": at the time of his absence was considered a permanent. He died in Lisbon shortly after (on 12 September 1942) from his continuing medical condition: he was only 48 years old. A year earlier, his administration named a group of residential homes alongside the public garden as Bairro Moreira de Carvalho, that then pertained to the Albergue de Mendicidade da Horta . Although constructed of wood, the small neighbourhood survived until the 20th century, and later became a reference in the local toponymy.

For his efforts to squelch the labour movement in Setúbal and capture of Spanish republican fugitives, he was awarded Knight in the Military Order of Avis (5 October 1929) and Grand-Official in the Military Order of Christ (19 November 1941).
