= Graciella Carvalho =

Brazilian beauty contest winner

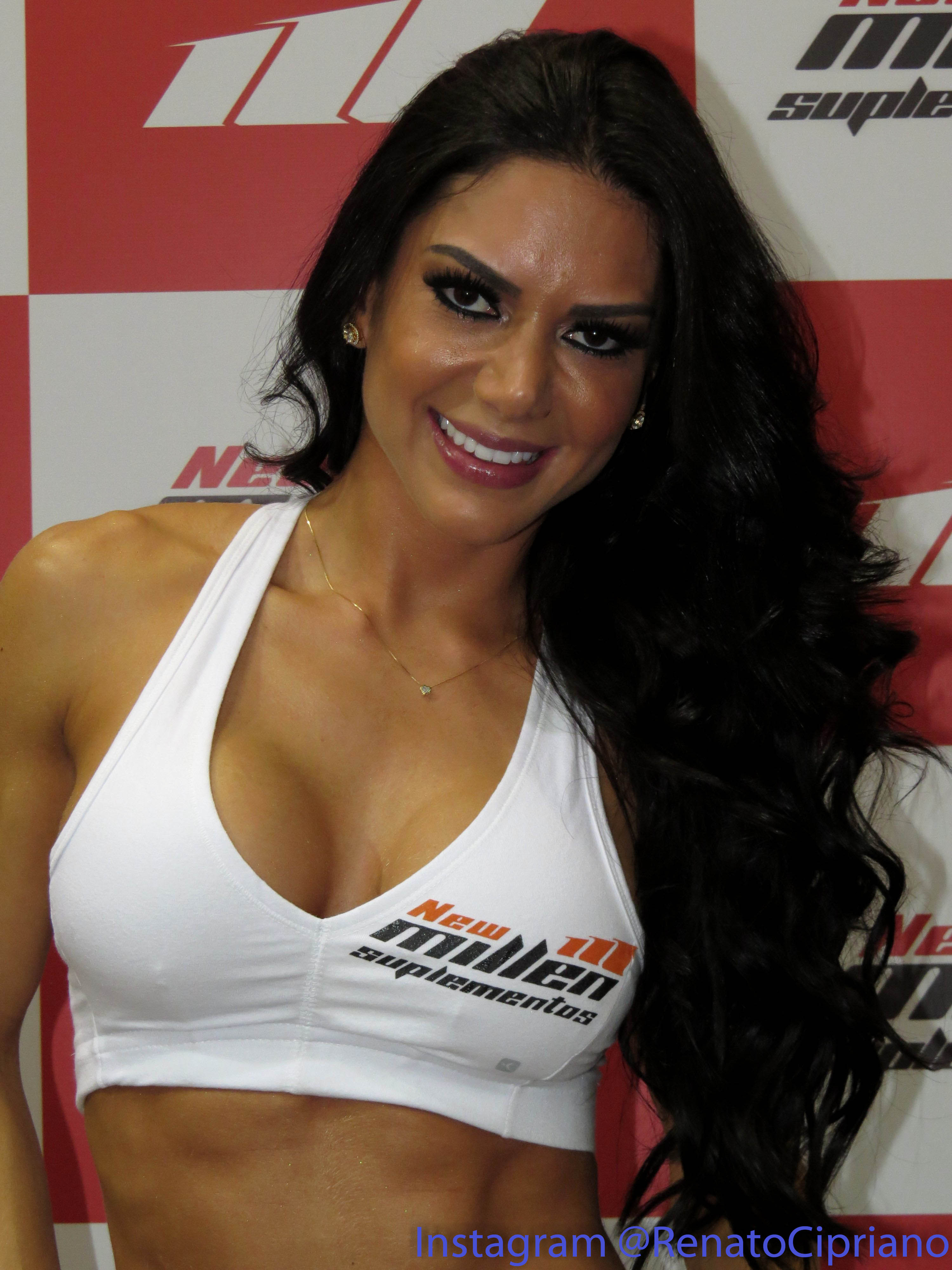
- Carvalho in 2014
- Born: Graciella Carvalho; October 31, 1985 (age 40); Santo André, São Paulo, Brazil
- Occupation: Beauty Contest Winner
- Years active: 2011–present
- Modeling information
- Height: 5 ft 5.75 in (1.67 m)
- Hair color: Black
- Eye color: Brown
- Website: www.graciellacarvalho.com.br

Graciella Carvalho (born October 31, 1985) is a Brazilian beauty contest winner. She placed second in the Miss Bum Bum Brazil 2011 Beauty Contest, a nationwide contest held since 2011.
