= Micropolix =

Micropolix is a privately held Spanish family entertainment center company currently operating in San Sebastian de los Reyes, Madrid, based one edutainment (education + entertainment). Its main attractiveness is that Micropolix presents kids the opportunity to play and learn how to be adults, playing different activities based on values and allowing them to work in adult jobs and earn currency to then be able to play other activities and learn about them too. Micropolix has received more than 2.5 million guests since its opening, making it the most well known edutainment brand in Spain.

== Overview ==
Every Micropolix is themed as a child-sized replica of a real city, including buildings, shops and theaters, as well as vehicles and pedestrians moving along its streets. In this city, children aged 4 through 16, work in branded activities from retail El Corte Ingles, investigating in a I+D*i food lab Pascual or even learning how to be a responsible driver at Renault circuit. More than 40 different activities counting on one hundred roles. The children earn Eurix (Micropolix’s currency) while performing the tasks, and the money is kept in the Micropolix bank for children to spend on the activities.

Four years after its opening more than 2.5 million visitors had visited the site. Along these years Micropolix has been featured in many print and TV media, spotlighting its blending of creativity, entrepreneurship and education.

== History ==
Micropolix was created and developed by Spanish entrepreneur Joe L. Garrigo, starting operations in December 2008 after several years of ardouos design, development and preparation. He was its main designer and General Creative Director until he divested from the company to start news projects in 2012.

== Awards and recognition ==
Micropolix has been awarded from various organizations that -aware of their uniqueness- have highlighting its educational values: "Childhood 2009 Award"; "Protagonist of Education 2012 Award".
