= Hardly Electronic =

Studio album by The Essex Green
- Released: June 29, 2018
- Length: 53:57
- Label: Merge

The Essex Green chronology
Cannibal Sea (2006)	Hardly Electronic (2018)

Professional ratings
Aggregate scores
Source	Rating
Metacritic	75/100
Review scores
Source	Rating
AllMusic	4/5 stars
Blurt	3/5 stars
Exclaim!	9/10
Paste	8.3/10

Hardly Electronic is the fourth studio album by American indie rock band The Essex Green. It was released on June 29, 2018 under Merge Records.

== Critical reception ==
Hardly Electronic was met with "generally favorable" reviews from critics. At Metacritic, which assigns a weighted average rating out of 100 to reviews from mainstream publications, this release received an average score of 75, based on 7 reviews. Aggregator Album of the Year gave the release an 80 out of 100 based on a critical consensus of 6 reviews.

== Track listing ==
Hardly Electronic track listing
No.	Title	Length
1.	"Sloane Ranger"	4:02
2.	"The 710"	3:45
3.	"Don't Leave It in Our Hands"	4:20
4.	"In the Key of Me"	3:50
5.	"Modern Rain"	4:11
6.	"Catatonic"	3:37
7.	"Patsy Desmond"	4:16
8.	"Bye Bye Crow"	2:44
9.	"Waikiki"	2:49
10.	"January Says"	4:23
11.	"Slanted by Six"	3:38
12.	"Smith & 9th"	3:30
13.	"Another Story"	4:12
14.	"Bristol Sky"	4:40

== Personnel ==
Musicians

- Jeff Baron – vocals
- Sasha Bell – guitar
- Christopher Ziter – drums

Production

- Fred Kevorkian – mastering
- Matt Boynton – mixing
