= Edgar Pacheco =

Edgar Pacheco may refer to:

- Edgar Pacheco (footballer, born 1977), Angola-born Portuguese football forward
- Edgar Pacheco (footballer, born 2000), Portuguese football winger
- Édgar Pacheco (born 1990), Mexican football midfielder
