= María Elena Carballo =

Costa Rican politician and government minister

María Elena Carballo (born 1958) is a Costa Rican politician. She was the Minister of Youth and Culture in Costa Rica in 2006–2010.

== Early life and education ==
Carballo has a degree from the University of Costa Rica and a PhD in Literary Studies from Brandeis University. She was a Fulbright scholar. La casa peterna, a book that Carballo co-wrote, won the 1993 National Essay Prize.
