= David Nunes Carvalho =

American photographer and handwriting expert

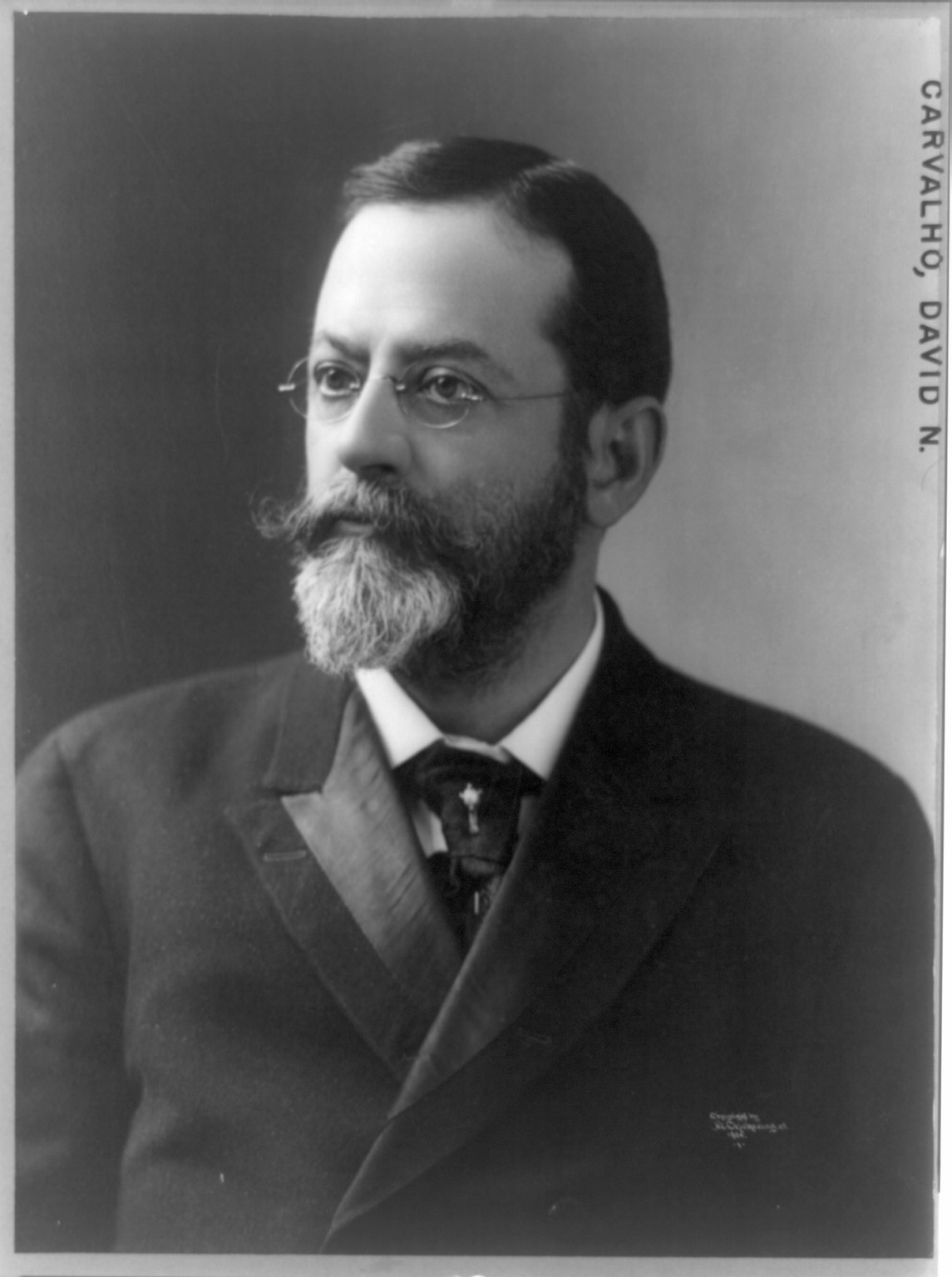
- Born: September 29, 1848; Philadelphia, Pennsylvania, U.S.
- Died: June 29, 1925 (aged 76); New Rochelle, New York, U.S.
- Father: Solomon Nunes Carvalho

David Nunes Carvalho (September 29, 1848 - June 29, 1925) was an American ink and handwriting expert who provided testimony in notable legal cases and was the author of Forty Centuries of Ink, a book about ink analysis.

== Early life and education ==
Carvalho was born in 1848, the son of noted artist Solomon Nunes Carvalho and Sarah Miriam Solis. He studied at New York College, where he specialized in organic chemistry and photography. He married Annie M. Abrams and they had six children. The family lived in Breezy Point in Far Rockaway, New York. In 1899 Carvalho sued The Jamaica Bay Turnpike Company to keep them from building a bridge connecting Rockaway Beach to Brooklyn claiming it would "completely destroy the character" of his property. In 1911 he bought a "country estate" in Roslyn, NY.

== Career ==
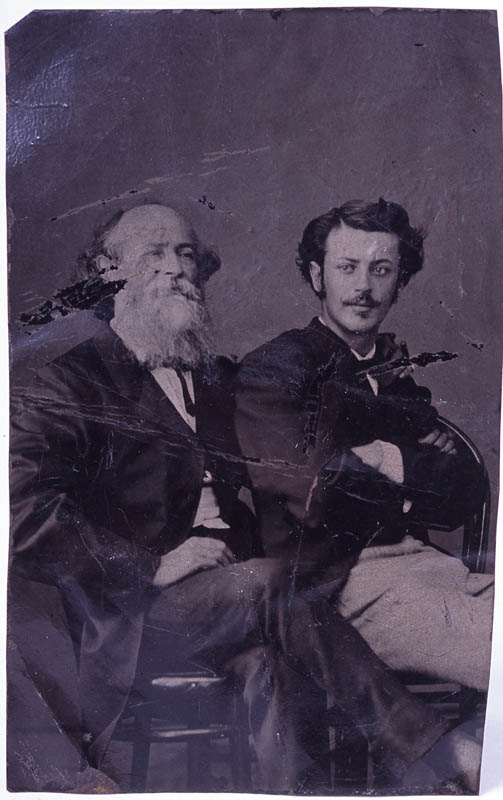
Carvalho and his father in 1872

Carvalho did early work with his father in his father's photography studio. He worked at a photography studio in New York City from 1877 through 1885. He worked with New Jersey Stereoscopic View Company likely in the 1870s and was working for the Bachrach Photo-Engraving Company in 1875. He filed for several patents for improving the photography process.

- Patent 225458A a method to shorten exposure times by painting the studio an orange pea green color and coating the collodion negative with a film of violet colored collodion
- Patent 234171A a method of producing photographic images
- Patent 237246 a method for focusing frames using celluloid
- Patent 237247 a method for photo backgrounds using celluloid
- Patent 237248 a method for printing frames using celluloid
- Patent 1353720 a method of coating documents to protect them from being erased

== Handwriting analysis ==
Carvalho maintained a large collection of handwriting and ink samples and was called upon to testify in legal cases which involved handwriting, especially the signatures on wills, testifying in over 2000 cases. He would investigate the inks used to sign documents chemically as well as microscopically. He received a regular salary from the New York Detective Bureau to consult on cases requiring handwriting analysis. He was also sometimes called on to examine fingerprints. He was scornful of graphology as a means of identifying personality traits stating "I have had the pleasure, so to speak, of sending thousands of forgers to state's prison. Yet with all my study of their penmanship, I never learned an important thing about their characters." He believed that the study of handwriting was an exact science.

His personal collection contained "items that are representative of ordinary handwriting from the 10th to the 20th centuries, written in English, French, Latin, German, and Dutch. The bulk of the items are from the 17th to the 19th centuries. Samples, on paper and vellum, include indentures, letters, receipts, and pages of accounts... also a small set of examples of alphabets from many countries; 19th century examples of engraved death and marriage announcements; engraved portraits of writing masters; examples of minute calligraphy."

The Hartford Daily Courant reported "Sir Conan Doyle stated in a lecture in New York that Mr. Carvalho's powers exceeded those given to Sherlock Holmes." Notable cases he was involved in included the William Marsh Rice case, the People v. Molineux, and the Dreyfus Affair which garnered him international attention as he offered a deposition against the findings of Alphonse Bertillon. He offered testimony that Eric Muenter and Frank Holt were separate people, a determination later found to be incorrect. In 1906 the Keowee Courier called him "the most prominent expert examiner of questioned handwriting, inks and paper in America" after his testimony in a local murder trial.

Carvalho wrote a few books on the topic of handwriting analysis. Forty Centuries of Ink explored how and where ink has been produced, examined its ingredients and its effect on different forms of paper, and discussed how it was used throughout history by different cultures. He critiqued the use of modern colored aniline inks as being impermanent and unsuitable for creating public records. He spent the later part of his career attempting to create a way to make ink, "unerasable" resulting in his 1920 patent creating such a method.

== Death and legacy ==
Carvalho died of pneumonia in 1925.

While he was well-known during his lifetime, his career as a handwriting expert was outlined and further promoted the 1929 book, Crime in Ink, written by his daughter Claire Carvalho and Boyden Sparkes. The book, outlining many of his famous cases, received positive reviews and was serialized in Red Book Magazine. The David N. Carvalho Collection of rare books and manuscripts is at the Free Library of Philadelphia. His collection of incunabula was cataloged by biographer Henrietta C. Bartlett before being sold for $1,385.95 in 1917.
