= Everything Is Green =

Studio album by The Essex Green
- Released: 1999
- Genre: Indie pop
- Label: Kindercore Records

The Essex Green chronology
Everything Is Green (1999)	The Long Goodbye (2003)

Professional ratings
Review scores
Source	Rating
Allmusic	4/5 stars

Everything Is Green is the first album by indie rock band the Essex Green. It was recorded at Studio 45 in Hartford, CT and Marlborough Farms in Brooklyn and released in 1999 by Kindercore Records.

== Track listing ==
1. "Primrose"
2. "The Playground"
3. "Mrs. Bean"
4. "Tinker"
5. "Everything Is Green"
6. "Sixties"
7. "Saturday"
8. "Grass"
9. "Big Green Tree"
10. "Carballo"
