= José Caraballo (painter) =

Puerto Rican artist

- Born: 1930; Santurce, Puerto Rico
- Died: 1992 (aged 61–62); Collegedale, Tennessee
- Occupation: artist

Jose Caraballo (born 1930 in Santurce, Puerto Rico) moved to New York City with his parents at the age of 14. In 1947 Jose studied graphics and sculpture in a Greenwich Village workshop. That same year he had the good fortune to meet the great Mexican artist Rufino Tamayo at the Rufino Tamayo Studio at the Brooklyn Museum of Art where Rufino Tamayo was teaching art. Jose Caraballo exhibited paintings in 1950 in Chicago. He then exhibited at the Oller-Campeche-Gallery in Puerto Rico, Galleria II, Galleria Tito, Allen Rich Galleries, Duncan Galleries in Paris, France, and many other Galleries throughout New York. Jose Caraballo also had exhibits at the Museum of the City of New York, Livingston College, Howard University in Washington, Cornell Medical Center, Mount Sinai Hospital, and El Museo del Barrio in NYC. Jose Caraballo has had extensive television coverage of his paintings and other works of art.

In 1979, while President of the Hispanic Arte League (H.A.L), Jose Caraballo organized the 1st Latin American Art Biennial in NYC. For that exhibition Jose invited his friend Rufino Tamayo to attend as guest of honor. Rufino Tamayo was by then the most famous living artist in Mexico so it was a great honor for Jose Caraballo that Rufino Tamayo accepted the invitation and came to NYC to spend a few weeks with Jose Caraballo and his family. Rufino Tamayo helped inspire the works in stencil that Jose Caraballo would create after that visit. Jose Caraballo was one of the first artists to depict the life and culture of the Taino Indians of Borinquen. Caraballo also explored other aspects of Puerto Rican culture and artistic horizons, through his paintings, drawings, graphics, and tapestries. He was awarded "The Palma Julia de Burgos" Cultural award in 1978.

In 1978 Jose Caraballo was included in the famous book "Painting and Sculpture of the Puerto Ricans" by Peter Bloch. This is part of what Peter Bloch wrote "It is Jose Caraballo who first made a specialty of Taino themes, in drawings, paintings, graphics and relief work. When he had thoroughly explored Borinquen's pre-history in his art, he continued with other aspects of Puerto Rican culture and history but also creates surrealist and semi-abstract work which is always ingenious and fascinating. In his paintings and drawings on Puerto Rican themes he cultivates a stylized realism. His horizons are wide; and he is one of the truly eminent Puerto Rican artists". Peter Bloch also included 4 images of linocuts and pen and ink drawings by Jose Caraballo in this book.

Jose Caraballo died in Collegedale, Tennessee in 1992 at the age of 62. His work continues to be exhibited throughout the US.

== See also ==
- List of Puerto Ricans
