= Ramiro Carballo =

Salvadoran footballer (born 1978)

Personal information
- Full name: Ramiro Ernesto Carballo Henríquez
- Date of birth: 16 March 1978 (age 48)
- Place of birth: Colón, La Libertad, El Salvador
- Height: 1.75 m (5 ft 9 in)
- Position: Defender

Youth career
- 1993–1996: Alianza

Senior career*
| Years | Team | Apps | (Gls) |
| 1997–2002 | Alianza | 353 | |
| 2003–2004 | San Salvador FC | 28 | |
| 2005–2009 | Alianza | | |
| 2010 | Isidro Metapán | 10 | |
| 2010–2014 | UES | 110 | |
| 2014 | Luis Ángel Firpo | 16 | (1) |
| 2014–2016 | Juventud Independiente | 78 | (5) |
| 2016–2017 | Municipal Limeño | | |

International career
| 1999–2007 | El Salvador | 16 | (0) |
- * Club domestic league appearances and goals

Ramiro Ernesto Carballo Henríquez (born 16 March 1978) is a Salvadoran former professional footballer who played as a defender.

== Club career ==
Ramiro Carballo was born in Colón, La Libertad, El Salvador. He came through the youth ranks at Alianza and made his professional debut for the club in 1997.

He had a short spell with San Salvador six years later, only to return to Alianza after only one season.

After another four years later he left Alianza for another short stint, with Isidro Metapán. Later joined UES in 2010.

On 12 August 2013, Carballo played his 500th game in the Salvadoran Primera División playing for UES against Isidro Metapán, despite losing 1–0.

He announced his retirement from football on 5 August 2017, He played 603 games in the primera division.

== International career ==
Carballo made his debut for El Salvador in an October 1999 CONCACAF Gold Cup qualification match against Canada and has earned a total of 15 caps, scoring no goals.

He has represented his country in 5 FIFA World Cup qualification matches and played at the 2007 CONCACAF Gold Cup.

His final international game was a September 2007 friendly match, against Ecuador.
