= All Days Are Nights: Songs for Lulu =

Studio album by Rufus Wainwright
- Released: March 23, 2010
- Recorded: December 2009
- Genre: Pop
- Length: 47:48
- Labels: Decca (US), Polydor (UK)
- Producers: Rufus Wainwright, Pierre Marchand

Rufus Wainwright chronology
Milwaukee at Last!!! (2009)	All Days Are Nights: Songs for Lulu (2010)	House of Rufus (2011)

Singles from All Days Are Nights: Songs for Lulu
- 1. "Who Are You New York?" Released: March 2, 2010 (Canada)

All Days Are Nights: Songs for Lulu is the sixth studio album by Canadian-American singer-songwriter Rufus Wainwright, first released in Canada through Decca Records on March 23, 2010. The album was produced by Wainwright (with Pierre Marchand on three tracks), and mixed by Marchand, who produced Wainwright's second album, Poses (2001).

All Days Are Nights is Wainwright's first release since the death of his mother, folk singer Kate McGarrigle, who died from cancer in January 2010. While Wainwright is known for lush orchestrations and arrangements, this album contains piano and voice work, with twelve original songs. Three songs are settings of William Shakespeare's sonnets ("Sonnet 10", "Sonnet 20", and "Sonnet 43").

== Conception and development ==
Following larger projects such as his tribute concert series to Judy Garland and subsequent album release (Rufus Does Judy at Carnegie Hall, 2007), Release the Stars (2007), and annual Christmas shows billed as the "McGarrigle Christmas Hour", Wainwright intended for his next studio release to be a simpler piano and voice album.

=== Title ===
The first part of the title, "All Days Are Nights", comes from the final couplet of William Shakespeare's "Sonnet 43" ("All days are nights to see till I see thee..."). When asked about the reference to "Lulu", which appears in the second part of the album's title, Wainwright stated in a November 2009 interview that Lulu is a "dark, brooding, dangerous woman that lives within all of us", similar to the Dark Lady character in Shakespeare's sonnets. Wainwright claimed that his Lulu was Louise Brooks in the 1929 movie Pandora's Box. He also stated in an interview with Jian Ghomeshi that Lulu is a reference to the opera of the same name by Alban Berg, which was adapted from Frank Wedekind's plays Earth Spirit (or Erdgeist, 1895) and Pandora's Box (or Die Büchse der Pandora, 1904), the latter of which inspired the aforementioned film by G. W. Pabst.

=== Promotion ===
Images used for the album insert and other promotional material were taken during a photo shoot with photographer Kevin Westenberg on January 5, 2010, at Park Avenue Armory in New York City. On March 15, 2010, Wainwright previewed the album by performing an intimate concert at Rose Bar in the Gramercy Park Hotel in New York City. Celebrities in attendance included Eva Amurri, Penn Badgley, Drew Barrymore, Alexis Bledel, Alan Cumming, Scarlett Johansson, Michael Kors, Lucy Liu, Natasha Lyonne, Kyle Martino, Lou Reed, Susan Sarandon, Christian Siriano, Amber Tamblyn, and Zachary Quinto.

"Who Are You New York?" was first released as a single in digital format on the Canadian iTunes Store on March 2, 2010.

== Songs ==
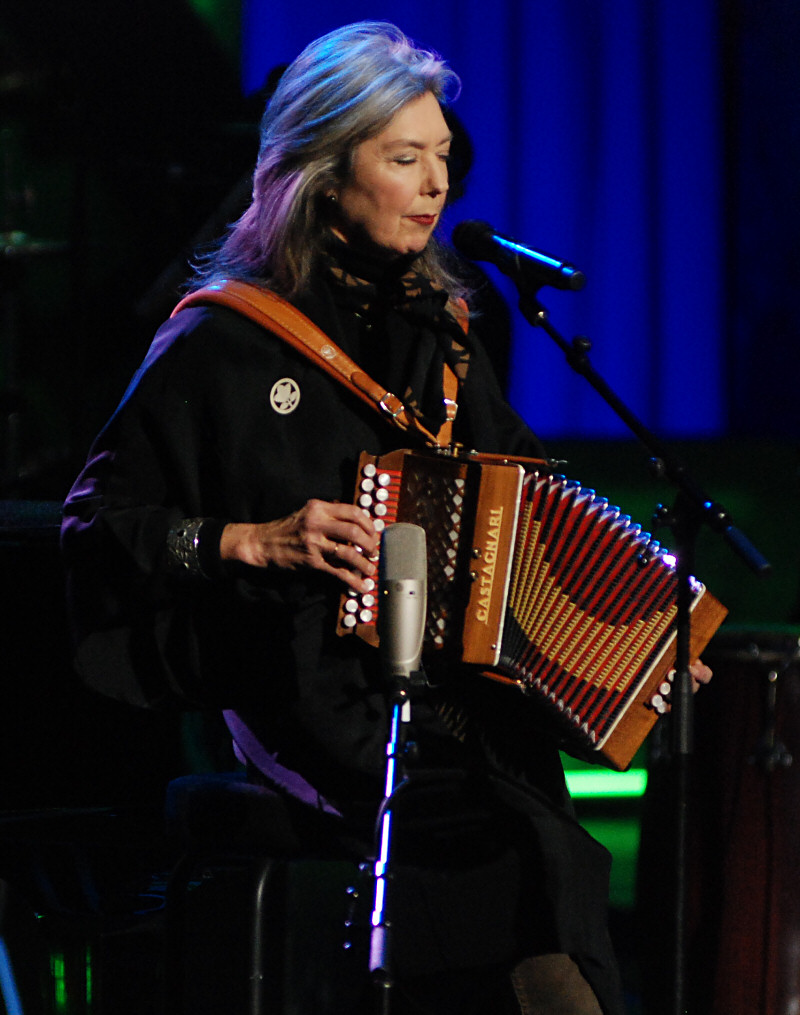
Kate McGarrigle, Wainwright's mother and the subject of "Zebulon"

In the album's opening track, "Who Are You New York?", Wainwright uses rolling arpeggios while recounting an "obsessive search for an unnamed object of desire". The song was originally written for a film, but was rejected by the movie's producers (to Wainwright's apparent relief). References to New York City in the song's lyrics include Grand Central Terminal, Madison Square Garden and the Empire State Building. "Sad with What I Have", described as an "abyss of self-pity", contains a reference to Bluebeard, the title character in a 1697 fairy tale by Charles Perrault.

"Martha" consists of conversational lyrics inspired by Wainwright's sister Martha. Wainwright claimed the song is about the "finite nature of time – you can go on and on, and one day, everybody's gone and there's nothing you can do about it." One NME reviewer described the upbeat track "Give Me What I Want and Give It to Me Now!", just over two minutes in length, as a "seemingly ritzy show-tune, undercut by a vague hint of something sinister looming up ahead." Directed towards critics of his opera, Wainwright considers the song one of the most personal tracks on the album.

"True Loves" is an aphoristic reflection on love that concludes "A heart of stone never goes anywhere". "The Dream" is a melancholic song about the "sense of loss you feel after waking from a beautiful vision". In the "sweet-scented" ballad "What Would I Ever Do with a Rose?", Wainwright poetically meditates on love and nature. "Les feux d'artifice t'appellent" is the closing aria from Wainwright's debut opera, Prima Donna, which premiered at the Manchester International Festival in July 2009. On the album, Wainwright taps on the piano's sounding board and runs his hands along its strings to simulate the "crackle and cascade" of fireworks (which light up the Paris skyline in the opera).

"Zebulon", which has a "slow sad melody", contains references to an old crush, as well as to Wainwright's mother (folk singer Kate McGarrigle) and sister. Wainwright wrote the song while his mother was sick and staying at the Royal Victoria Hospital in Montreal, as evident by the line "My mother's in hospital, my sister's at the opera". The Edmonton Journal's Sandra Sperounes described the song as a reenactment of Wainwright's "plodding" steps, which steadily build into a "promise of triumph or, at the very least, temporary relief from pain". Both Wainwright and his mother claimed the song to be one of their favorites, the former even considering it one of the most "profound" pieces on the album.

=== Sonnets ===
Three of the songs on the album are adaptations of Shakespeare's sonnets—"Sonnet 10", "Sonnet 20", and "Sonnet 43". Wainwright composed music for each of the sonnets, along with several others, when collaborating with avant-garde stage director Robert Wilson and the Berliner Ensemble on a project known as "Sonette". The production premiered in Berlin in April 2009, and contained 24 sonnets, each stylized with cross-dressing actors, "lavish costumes, huge hair-dos and [Wilson's] trademark lighting and puppet-like choreography.

"Sonnet 10", considered one of Shakespeare's procreation sonnets (which encourage the young man to marry and father children), marks the first time the poet indicates his own devotion to the young man.

Regarding the sonnets, Wainwright stated: "I had never really immersed myself in them and I came out the end with the traditional view that they could be the greatest pieces of literature ever written." NME music reviewer Luke Lewis suggested that listeners might find "Sonnet 43" pretentious due to its "oblique, wonky melodies" and "Sonnet 10" difficult depending on their tolerance for "piano-led whimsy and Elizabethan circumlocution". However, he complimented "Sonnet 20" for its less abstract melodies. The Times music critic Peter Paphides commented that the sonnets reined in Wainwright's grandiose tendencies, setting them apart from original music featured on the album.

== Tour ==
To promote the album, Wainwright began touring in April 2010 with a series of concerts throughout Ireland and the United Kingdom. His North American tour began on June 15 at the Luminato festival in Toronto, one night after the North American debut of his opera, Prima Donna.

During the tour, Wainwright performed songs from the album as a song cycle, with no applause permitted in between. Wainwright toured alone, both due to the simpler piano and voice sound of the album and because declining ticket prices did not allow him to perform with a large band. However, concerts did include an accompanying film by Scottish video artist Douglas Gordon and some "glam-ish costuming" by fashion designer Zaldy Goco, who created a 17-foot-long, black feathered cape for Wainwright. Wainwright acknowledged that touring would be a challenge, as All Days Are Nights: Songs for Lulu contains some of his "most difficult" and "technically demanding" work. Regarding his tour and ability to face his grief over his mother's death, Wainwright admitted: "This is such new territory for me and there are moments when I think I'm doing fine and two seconds later I'm on the floorboards so it's uncharted. I'm just figuring it out as I go along. It's what we all go through... but it's still very tough."

== Performances by other artists ==
The whole song cycle of All Days Are Nights was performed by opera singers (Corinne Winters, Liza Forrester, Andrew Garland, and Joshua Jeremiah) at Lincoln Center in New York City on November 17, 2011, under the title Who Are You New York?: The Songs of Rufus Wainwright. It was presented by the New York City Opera prior to the US premiere of Wainwright's opera Prima Donna at the NYCO.

On March 1, 2012, Canadian mezzo-soprano Wallis Giunta performed the complete song cycle in a concert at the Jane Mallett Theatre in Toronto, and has continued to perform selections regularly in recital.

The song cycle was also sung by soprano Janis Kelly and mezzo-soprano Angelika Kirchschlager during concerts with Wainwright on March 9, 2014, in Sankt Pölten, Austria and June 14, 2015, in Ludwigsburg, Germany.

== Critical reception ==
Professional ratings
Aggregate scores
Source	Rating
Metacritic	72/100
Review scores
Source	Rating
AllMusic	4/5 stars
The A.V. Club	A−
Drowned in Sound	7/10
Entertainment Weekly	B
The Guardian	4/5 stars
Pitchfork	3.9/10
PopMatters	6/10
Rolling Stone	3.5/5 stars
Slant Magazine	3.5/5 stars
The Times	3/5 stars

Overall, critical reception of the album was positive. NME's Luke Lewis admitted that the album would not be to everyone's tastes, but asserted that lovers of Wainwright's voice will see this collection as its "purest, most uninterrupted expression yet". Furthermore, he complimented Wainwright's theatrical performance (despite his attempt at a stripped-down record), stating that "there's always a sense in which he's putting on a show, even when it's just him alone at a piano." Stockyard wrote that some of the Shakespeare sonnets Wainwright included on the album came out "difficult, clunky" and less than beautiful when set to music, but noted that "[p]erhaps it's not such an insult to say that [Wainwright has] failed to enhance Shakespeare." Sandra Sperounes called the album "far from perfect", mostly due to its lack of accessibility in "tone, subject and structure". Though Sperounes praised Wainwright for his ambitions, she criticized him for "dwell[ing] on his misery as most of his songs slowly plod along, with only a brief flurry of notes to punctuate the occasional phrase, as if he's mustering up the strength to make it through another minefield."

After asserting that "darkness" is a central theme to the album, music critic T'Cha Dunlevy wrote that the lack of lush orchestrations and arrangements Wainwright is known for emphasized his solitude, "exposing him in ways we haven't heard before." A reviewer for BBC claimed the album is successfully intimate and intense, and suggested it would be appropriate for "either a wet afternoon or long candlelit nights of soul searching". The Daily Telegraph published a five-star review stating that the album was Wainwright's "most moving and durable album to date" and concluded that his mother would be very proud of the collection.

== Track listing ==
William Shakespeare, author of three sonnets appearing on All Days Are Nights: Songs for Lulu

All songs written by Wainwright, unless otherwise noted.

1. "Who Are You New York?" – 3:42
2. "Sad with What I Have" – 3:06
3. "Martha" – 3:12
4. "Give Me What I Want and Give It to Me Now!" – 2:08
5. "True Loves" – 3:52
6. "Sonnet 43" (William Shakespeare, Wainwright) – 4:28
7. "Sonnet 20" (Shakespeare, Wainwright) – 2:59
8. "Sonnet 10" (Shakespeare, Wainwright) – 2:56
9. "The Dream" – 5:27
10. "What Would I Ever Do with a Rose?" – 4:23
11. "Les feux d'artifice t'appellent" (Wainwright, Bernadette Colomine) – 5:57
12. "Zebulon" – 5:38

iTunes Store pre-order bonus track (Canada, United States):

- "Zebulon" (live)

United Kingdom digipack bonus track:

- "Les feux d'artifice t'appellent" (alternate version)

== Personnel ==
- Rufus Wainwright – vocals, piano, record producer
- Tom Arndt – package coordinator
- Adam Ayan – mastering
- Pat Barry – creative coordinator
- Daniel Boldoc – piano technician
- Carlos Cicchalli – production coordination
- Douglas Cordon – photography
- Caroline Kousidonis – producer
- Pierre Marchand – mixing
- Amy Maybauer – A&R
- Evalyn Morgan – A&R
- Frederik Pedersen – assistant photographer
- Julian Peplos – design
- Cary Rough – assistant photographer
- Tom Schick – engineer
- Pascal Shefteshy – engineer, assistant
- Jörn Weisbrodt – handwriting
- Zeynep Yücal – producer

== Charts ==
Chart (2010)	Peak position
Austrian Albums Chart	75
Belgium Albums Chart	52
Top Canadian Albums	4
Danish Albums Chart	31
Dutch Albums Chart	38
French Albums Chart	160
Greek Albums Chart	13
Norwegian Albums Chart	27
Spanish Albums Chart	41
UK Albums Chart	21
Scottish Albums (Official Charts)	15

== Release history ==
All Days Are Nights: Songs for Lulu was first released through Decca in Canada on March 23, 2010, followed by the United Kingdom through Polydor on April 5, the European Union on April 12, and the United States through Decca on April 20. A digipak version of the album released in the U.K. contained an alternate version of "Les feux d'artifice t'appellent" as a bonus track. Canadians that pre-ordered the album using iTunes received a live version of "Zebulon" as a bonus track.

Region	Date	Distributing label	Format
Canada	March 23, 2010	Decca	CD
United Kingdom	April 5, 2010	Polydor	CD, digipack
European Union	April 12, 2010	Polydor	CD
United States	April 20, 2010	Decca	CD, vinyl
