= Sonnet 10 =

« » Sonnet 10
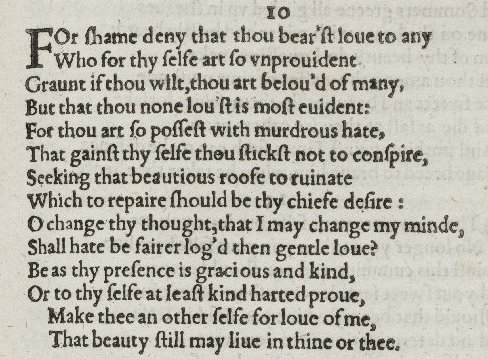
- Sonnet 10 in the 1609 Quarto
Q1
Q2
Q3
C
For shame, deny that thou bear’st love to any,
Who for thyself art so unprovident.
Grant, if thou wilt, thou art belov’d of many,
But that thou none lov’st is most evident;
For thou art so possess’d with murderous hate
That ’gainst thyself thou stick’st not to conspire,
Seeking that beauteous roof to ruinate
Which to repair should be thy chief desire.
O, change thy thought, that I may change my mind!
Shall hate be fairer lodg’d than gentle love?
Be, as thy presence is, gracious and kind,
Or to thyself at least kind-hearted prove:
Make thee another self, for love of me,
That beauty still may live in thine or thee.
—William Shakespeare
4
8
12
14

Sonnet 10 is one of 154 sonnets written by the English playwright and poet William Shakespeare. It is a procreation sonnet within the Fair Youth sequence.

In the sonnet, Shakespeare uses a rather harsh tone to admonish the young man for his refusal to fall in love and have children. It also continues and amplifies the theme of "hatred against the world" which appears rather suddenly in the last couplet of Sonnet 9. The two sonnets may be said therefore to be linked (like Sonnets 5 and 6 or Sonnets 15 and 16) even though the linkage takes a different form.

== Structure ==
Sonnet 10 is a typical English or Shakespearean sonnet. The English sonnet consists of three quatrains followed by a couplet, and follows the typical rhyme scheme of the form: ABAB CDCD EFEF GG. It is written in iambic pentameter, a type of poetic metre based on five pairs of metrically weak/strong syllabic positions per line. Line ten exemplifies a regular iambic pentameter line:

  ×    /    ×  /  ×   /       ×   /  ×   / 
Shall hate be fairer lodged than gentle love? (10.10)

...while the first two lines exhibit, respectively, a final extrametrical syllable (or feminine ending), and a likely initial reversal:

 ×    /    × /   ×    /   ×       /    × /(×)
For shame deny that thou bear'st love to any,

  /  ×    ×  /   ×    / ×   / × / 
Who for thy self art so unprovident. (10.1-2)

/ = ictus, a metrically strong syllabic position. × = nonictus. (×) = extrametrical syllable.

Though this is not the only possible scansion of the first two lines, the extra emphasis demanded by "thou" to prevent the ictus from resting on "bear'st", and the extra emphasis falling on "who" in an initial reversal, may be seen as pointing up the accusatory tone in the poem.

== Synopsis and analysis ==
The procreation theme is repeated, though for the first time a personal relationship between the poet and the youth is stated, even to the extent that the youth is asked to have a child to please the poet. In looking after himself alone the youth is accused of being "unprovident", of not disposing of his wealth properly and of not thinking of the future (pro + videre = to look in advance).

The poem stresses the charm of the youth. According to Shakespeare, the youth must concede ("Grant"), if he is so disposed ("if thou wilt"), that he is loved by many, as was Narcissus, who in Golding's words, "the hearts of divers trim yong men his beautie gan to move, / And many a Ladie fresh and faire was taken in his love." Like Narcissus, who "to be toucht of man or Mayde . . wholy did disdaine," the youth also refuses to be touched by or to love another.

The middle lines toy with imagery of political rebellion, mentioning conspiracies and destruction of houses. The youth is like the biblical house, which if it "be deuided agaynst it selfe, that house can not continue" (Mark 3.25; BB). The verse was used of the house of Satan and was a familiar topic of sermons.

The youth is also instructed to "change thy thought", a change similar to the biblical imperative of metanoia, to change one's mind, often translated as "repent", so that the poet will be of a different "mind" or memory.

== Further references ==
- Baldwin, T. W. (1950). On the Literary Genetics of Shakspeare's Sonnets. University of Illinois Press, Urbana.
- Hubler, Edwin (1952). The Sense of Shakespeare's Sonnets. Princeton University Press, Princeton.
- Schoenfeldt, Michael (2007). The Sonnets: The Cambridge Companion to Shakespeare's Poetry. Patrick Cheney, Cambridge University Press, Cambridge.

First edition and facsimile

- Shakespeare, William (1609). Shake-speares Sonnets: Never Before Imprinted. London: Thomas Thorpe.
- Lee, Sidney, ed. (1905). Shakespeares Sonnets: Being a reproduction in facsimile of the first edition. Oxford: Clarendon Press. OCLC 458829162.

Variorum editions

- Alden, Raymond Macdonald, ed. (1916). The Sonnets of Shakespeare. Boston: Houghton Mifflin Harcourt. OCLC 234756.
- Rollins, Hyder Edward, ed. (1944). A New Variorum Edition of Shakespeare: The Sonnets [2 Volumes]. Philadelphia: J. B. Lippincott & Co. OCLC 6028485. — Volume I and Volume II at the Internet Archive

Modern critical editions

- Atkins, Carl D., ed. (2007). Shakespeare's Sonnets: With Three Hundred Years of Commentary. Madison: Fairleigh Dickinson University Press. ISBN 978-0-8386-4163-7. OCLC 86090499.
- Booth, Stephen, ed. (2000) [1st ed. 1977]. Shakespeare's Sonnets (Rev. ed.). New Haven: Yale Nota Bene. ISBN 0-300-01959-9. OCLC 2968040.
- Burrow, Colin, ed. (2002). The Complete Sonnets and Poems. The Oxford Shakespeare. Oxford: Oxford University Press. ISBN 978-0192819338. OCLC 48532938.
- Duncan-Jones, Katherine, ed. (2010) [1st ed. 1997]. Shakespeare's Sonnets. Arden Shakespeare, third series (Rev. ed.). London: Bloomsbury. ISBN 978-1-4080-1797-5. OCLC 755065951. — 1st edition at the Internet Archive
- Evans, G. Blakemore, ed. (1996). The Sonnets. The New Cambridge Shakespeare. Cambridge: Cambridge University Press. ISBN 978-0521294034. OCLC 32272082.
- Kerrigan, John, ed. (1995) [1st ed. 1986]. The Sonnets ; and, A Lover's Complaint. New Penguin Shakespeare (Rev. ed.). Penguin Books. ISBN 0-14-070732-8. OCLC 15018446.
- Mowat, Barbara A.; Werstine, Paul, eds. (2006). Shakespeare's Sonnets & Poems. Folger Shakespeare Library. New York: Washington Square Press. ISBN 978-0743273282. OCLC 64594469.
- Orgel, Stephen, ed. (2001). The Sonnets. The Pelican Shakespeare (Rev. ed.). New York: Penguin Books. ISBN 978-0140714531. OCLC 46683809.
- Vendler, Helen, ed. (1997). The Art of Shakespeare's Sonnets. Cambridge, Massachusetts: The Belknap Press of Harvard University Press. ISBN 0-674-63712-7. OCLC 36806589.
