= Julien Civange =

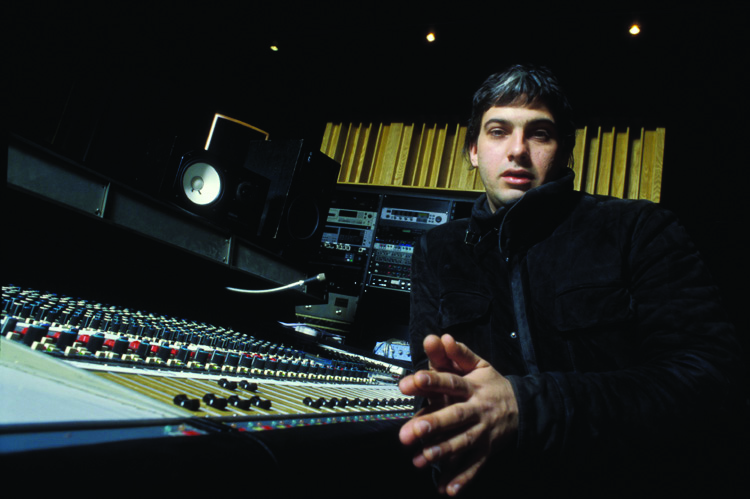

Background information
- Occupations: Producer, composer, lyricist, author
- Formerly of: La Place

Julien Civange is a French musician, composer, lyricist, and producer. He was born in Paris, France.

== Early career ==
Civange began working as a DJ at age 10 on the French underground radio Carbone 14. He later worked as a musical reporter for French magazines, radio and TV stations. Civange later left his reporting career at the age of 17. He has met numerous musicians (Bo Diddley, Charlie Burchill, Joe Strummer, Téléphone) who contributed to his musical autodidact background.

== La Place ==
At 16, Julien Civange created the rock band La Place, with two school friends. In its very first version the band sounds like a mix of punk energy and funk music. David Bowie who wanted the "best beginners band of the moment" invited La Place as an opening band for his concert with Tin Machine at la Cigale (1989).

Following Tour Sauvage and hundreds of live shows before various change of line-up and 4 years stuck in a basement, from which they emerge to make 7 concerts with Simple Minds (April–May 1995). Two months after, they were invited by the Rolling Stones at the Olympia (July 1995).

After this concerts, the band who had never had a label until then signed with an indie one (La Bande Son Canal +) and recorded their first and only album.

== Emmaus Mouvement ==
In 1998, following many encounters with Abbé Pierre, musician, producer Julien Civange proposed to add his contribution to the 50th anniversary of the Emmaus Mouvement by gathering together on one album a number of different musicians who supported the idea behind the Emmaus Mouvement – that is to say, the fight against all forms of exclusion. However, there was one condition – that every musician had to create a specific piece of music for the occasion or offer an as yet unpublished/unrecorded work. French singer Jean-Louis Aubert composed a very beautiful song "veille sur moi", Stephan Eicher recorded a duet with the group Bratsch, Joe Strummer improvised a folk cover version of " Junco Partner ", Linton Kwesi Johnson (LKJ) did a duet with Shurik'n and Imothep of the group IAM, Marianne Faithfull recorded the poems of Shakespeare, the group Les Rita Mitsouko recorded "Le Juste Prix", and Rachid Taha offered "54". Manu Chao, the group "Air", Cassius, Mars IV, Les Négresses Vertes, FFF and Howie B also participated in the album that was produced by Virgin Records.

Director, photographer Raymond Depardon made the promotional film for the album. Thanks to a competition by Steven Rubin, Fuji Laboratories and the film director David Fincher (Seven, The Game) 450 reels of film were released throughout France and shown just before the movie Fight Club.

The album was well received by both the public and the press, and therefore achieved its goal : for Emmaus Mouvement to touch a wide public particularly young people whilst celebrating its 50th anniversary through music.

== Music2Titan (2005) ==
Its more "abstract" production is Music2titan : Four musical themes composed with Louis Haeri that were placed on board ESA's Huygens probe in October 1997. Their vocation is to strengthen ESA and NASA's Cassini–Huygens mission to Saturn and Titan with the aim to leave trace of our humanity to the unknown and build awareness about this adventure. "Hot Time", "Bald James Deans", "Lalala" and "No Love" have reached Titan in January 2005 after a 7 years and 4 billion kilometer journey. Never will human signs have traveled and landed so far.

In 2004, Julien Civange organised the distribution and promotion of these music throughout the world by putting in place a system of distribution that is uniquely online (more adapted to follow the planning of a space mission than a physical distribution ! ) with all the iTunes Music Stores of Apple around the planet. Since then, from Cupertino the ITMS team supervises the release of the 4 pieces of music. Quick Time also actively participates in the promotion of this intergalactic event.

The ongoing progress and news is released by the media around the world, the site www.music2titan.com created for the occasion receives millions of visits from more than 110 countries and thousands of e-mails from around the globe.

The depositions of support flowed in from around the world, from the simple man in the street to the stars of the scientific world, to the stars of the entertainment world, like Mick Jagger who declared in a press statement : Mick Jagger said:

"Music has always been at the centre of cultures all over the world and I believe it will continue to play an important part in thousands of years time. Music has a role in the same way as technology and science in reflecting the age we live in and generally exploring new areas beyond the accepted boundaries and beyond earth. The music on board the spacecraft offers a very human touch to the project and at the same time provides an important educational aspect to the mission about outer space and contributes positively to the debate about whether there is any other planet or moon which can potentially sustain life."

== The Born HIV Free campaign (2010) ==
In 2010, Julien Civange designed and supervised the Born HIV Free campaign for the Global Fund, for which he brought together numerous artists and partners. The campaign originated and supported by Carla Bruni, was launched on May 19, 2010 to spread awareness of the struggle to create an AIDS-free generation by 2015 and to garner popular support for its continued donor financing.

Designed as an online and offline awareness campaign targeting the general public in Europe, and with the assistance from partners - Google, YouTube, Orange, MSN, 43 Internet partner firms, 20 TV channels and 20 press groups in 11 European countries, bill-boarding (JC Decaux), entertainment companies (Live Nation, Vivendi) and fashion companies (Tiffany). These partners helped convey a creative and educational campaign supported by artists including Paul McCartney, U2, Amy Winehouse and Jean-Paul Gaultier, together with up-and-coming young creative such as like H5 and the Bonzoms. On June 27, Paul McCartney gave his support to the Born HIV Free campaign by allowing his concert at Hard Rock Calling in Hyde Park to be exclusive streamed through the Born HIV Free YouTube channel, garnering over 11 million views. McCartney's donated set was the first European show to be streamed live on YouTube. Thousands watched and signed the Born HIV Free petition. Amy Winehouse offered the use of her song "Back to Black" for Bonzom's movie "Baby in the Sky". U2 offered the use of their song « "With or Without You" for the movie inside. Jean-Paul Gaultier created a special Born HIV Free "marinière"

The first step of the Born HIV Free campaign ended in New-York on October 5, 2010, following the pledges made by donors to the Global Fund for the subsequent three years (2011-2013). The $11.7 billion that was pledged to the Global Fund marked the largest collective pledge in its history. However, the total pledges fell short of the estimated resources needed to meet demand from developing countries seeking to further scale up their disease programs.

== Other artistic contributions ==
Civange has also composed and produced music or supervised soundtracks for movies, theatre productions and art installations.

== Filmography ==
- Faut que ça danse! directed by Noémie Lvovsky (2007)
- Actrices directed by Valeria Bruni Tedeschi (2007)
- Roberto Succo directed by Cédric Kahn (2001) (Festival de Cannes official selection competition)
- The Dreamers directed by Bernardo Bertolucci
- Choses secrètes directed by Jean Claude Brisseau (2002)
- Looking 4 Jimmy directed by Julie Delpy (2002)
- T'es où Mère Grand directed by François Chalet (Animation)
- Marie K et le loup directed by Marie Caillou (Animation
- Micro Loup directed by Richard Mc Guire (Animation)

== Theatre ==
- Hamlet (2003) co-produced by Théâtre des Amandiers de Nanterre (France) and Théâtre du Nouveau Monde (Montréal, Canada). Directed by Moshe Leiser and Patrice Caurier, with Charles Berling, Gabriel Arcand, Christiane Cohendy, Maurice Deschamps
- Caligula: directed by Charles Berling au Théâtre de l'Atelier (2006)

== Art and photography ==
- The Diary of John Doe installation by Bryan Mc Cormack
- Lude by Joséphine Michel
- Up / Down / Out by Nicolas Merault with Bryan Mc Cormack
- See nothing, Hear nothing, Know nothing by Bryan Mc Cormack

== Articles and references ==
- Music2Titan - European Space Agency (ESA) publication 1
- Music2Titan - European Space Agency (ESA) publication 2
- Music2Titan - European Space Agency (ESA) publication 3
- Music2Titan NASA publication
- Music2Titan on Radio France
- Born HIV Free - participation of Paul McCartney
- Roberto Succo review

Citations
