= Sonnet 14 =

Poem by William Shakespeare

« » Sonnet 14
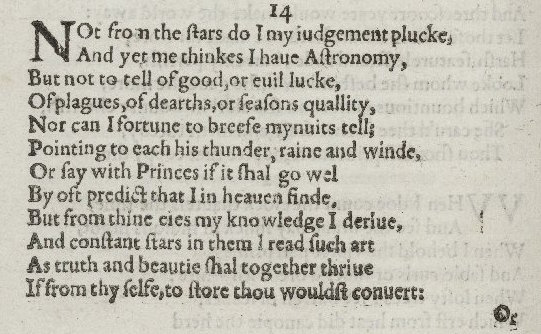
- The first twelve lines of Sonnet 14 in the 1609 Quarto
Q1
Q2
Q3
C
Not from the stars do I my judgement pluck;
And yet methinks I have astronomy,
But not to tell of good or evil luck,
Of plagues, of dearths, or seasons’ quality;
Nor can I fortune to brief minutes tell,
Pointing to each his thunder, rain and wind,
Or say with princes if it shall go well,
By oft predict that I in heaven find:
But from thine eyes my knowledge I derive,
And, constant stars, in them I read such art
As “truth and beauty shall together thrive,
If from thyself to store thou wouldst convert”;
Or else of thee this I prognosticate:
“Thy end is truth’s and beauty’s doom and date.”
—William Shakespeare
4
8
12
14

Sonnet 14 is one of 154 sonnets written by the English playwright and poet William Shakespeare. It is a procreation sonnet within the Fair Youth sequence.

== Structure ==
Sonnet 14 is an English or Shakespearean sonnet, which consists of three quatrains followed by a couplet. It follows the traditional rhyme scheme of the form: ABAB CDCD EFEF GG. Like many of the others in the sequence, it is written in a type of metre called iambic pentameter, which is based on five pairs of metrically weak/strong syllabic positions per line.

Typically English sonnets present a problem or argument in the quatrains, and a resolution in the final couplet. This sonnet suggests this pattern, but its rhetorical structure is more closely modeled upon the older Petrarchan sonnet which arranges the octave (the first eight lines) in contrast to the sestet (the final six lines).

Line 3 exemplifies a regular iambic pentameter:

 ×   /   ×  /   ×   /    ×  / ×   / 
But not to tell of good, or evil luck, (14.3)

/ = ictus, a metrically strong syllabic position. × = nonictus.

== Historical Context ==
Some critics argue that the Fair Youth sequence follows a story-line told by Shakespeare. Evidence that corroborates this is that the sonnets show a constant change of attitude that would seem to follow a day-by-day private journal entry. Furthermore, there is an argument that the Fair Youth sequence was written to Henry Wriothesley, 3rd Earl of Southampton. Critics believe that Shakespeare would like him to marry and have an heir so that his beauty would live forever. To this day the relationship between Henry Wriothesly and Shakespeare is debated due to the fact that some believe it was romantic in nature, and not platonic. Regardless most critics agree that Shakespeare wrote this sonnet in order to convince him to produce an heir.

== Exegesis ==
Sonnet 14 contains a speaker that may not know how to predict the future or what will happen, but they do know the value of procreating to retain one's beauty throughout the ages.

=== Quatrain 1 ===
Quatrain 1 has multiple references to astronomy, and other literature. Edward Dowden argues that Philip Sidney's Astrophel and Stella is an influence in this sonnet due to the nature of both of the sonnets. For example, Sonnet 26 of Sidney's Astrophel and Stella has a line "though duskie wits doe scorne Astrology.. who oft bewares my after following case, by only those two starres in Stella's face." A. L. Rowse points out in both of these poems the speaker is unable to predict the future by using astrology, and can only predict the future through the object of their poem's eyes.

According to Frederick Fleays, lines 3-4 are possible references to plagues that occurred in 1592–1593, and the dearths that followed in 1594–1596. Alfread Rollins also states there was an irregularity in the seasons in 1595–1596, which all could have influenced these lines from Shakespeare.

=== Quatrain 2 ===
Lines 8–9 have influences from Ovid's Amores and Shakespeare's own "Love Labor's Lost". George Steevens points out that Shakespeare's early comedy included a line stating "From women's eyes this doctrine I derive." In the context of Sonnet 14 it is explaining the importance of procreation, and that it is necessary. Ovid's Amores has a similar line "at mihe te comitem auroras usque futuram- per me perque oculos, siders rostra, tuos." Both Samuel Johnson and George Steevens noted the similar meaning and that it indicates Roman influence on Shakespeare's poetry.

=== Quatrain 3 ===
Lines 10-11 are saying that one can see that truth and beauty would thrive together; if only you would focus on the business of making provisions for yourself.

=== Couplet ===
Shakespeare uses the portentous polysyllabic verb prognosticate with the alliteration 'doom and date' which is the stock in the trade of astrologers. This is Shakespeare's prognostication, and it is delivered with a smile. West believed this due to the emphasis against the metre on 'this'. Line 14 is saying that when one is dead, their truths and beauties come to an end as well.

== Interpretations ==
- Marianne Faithfull, for the 1999 compilation album, Emmaüs Mouvement (Virgin France)
- Ioan Gruffudd, for the 2002 compilation album, When Love Speaks (EMI)
