= Sonnet 18 =

Sonnet by William Shakespeare

« » Sonnet 18
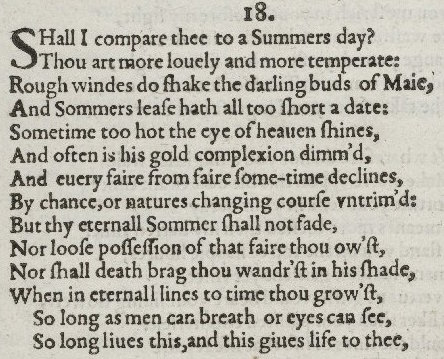
- Sonnet 18 in the 1609 Quarto of Shakespeare's sonnets
Q1
Q2
Q3
C
Shall I compare thee to a summer’s day?
Thou art more lovely and more temperate:
Rough winds do shake the darling buds of May,
And summer’s lease hath all too short a date:
Sometime too hot the eye of heaven shines,
And often is his gold complexion dimmed;
And every fair from fair sometime declines,
By chance, or nature’s changing course, untrimmed:
But thy eternal summer shall not fade,
Nor lose possession of that fair thou ow’st;
Nor shall Death brag thou wander’st in his shade
When in eternal lines to time thou grow’st:
So long as men can breathe or eyes can see,
So long lives this, and this gives life to thee.
—William Shakespeare
4
8
12
14

Sonnet 18 (also known as "Shall I compare thee to a summer's day") is one of the best-known of the 154 sonnets written by the English poet and playwright William Shakespeare.

In the sonnet, the speaker asks whether he should compare the Fair Youth to a summer's day, but notes that he has qualities that surpass a summer's day, which is one of the themes of the poem. He also notes the qualities of a summer day are subject to change and will eventually diminish. The speaker then states that the Fair Youth will live forever in the lines of the poem, as long as it can be read. There is an irony being expressed in this sonnet: it is not the actual young man who will be eternalised, but the description of him contained in the poem, and the poem contains scant or no description of the young man, but instead contains vivid and lasting descriptions of a summer day, which the young man is supposed to outlive.

== Structure ==
Sonnet 18 is a typical English or Shakespearean sonnet, having 14 lines of iambic pentameter: three quatrains followed by a couplet. It also has the characteristic rhyme scheme: ABAB CDCD EFEF GG. The poem reflects the rhetorical tradition of an Italian or Petrarchan Sonnet. Petrarchan sonnets typically discussed the love and beauty of a beloved, often an unattainable love, but not always. It also contains a volta, or shift in the poem's subject matter, beginning with the third quatrain.

The couplet's first line exemplifies a regular iambic pentameter rhythm:

 ×  /   ×   /   ×    /     ×  /     ×   / 
So long as men can breathe or eyes can see, (18.13)

/ = ictus, a metrically strong syllabic position. × = nonictus.

== Context ==
The poem is part of the Fair Youth sequence (which comprises sonnets 1–126 in the accepted numbering stemming from the first edition in 1609). It is also the first of the cycle after the opening sequence now described as the procreation sonnets. Some scholars, however, contend that it is part of the procreation sonnets, as it addresses the idea of reaching eternal life through the written word, a theme they find in sonnets 15–17. In this view, it can be seen as part of a transition to sonnet 20's time theme.

== Analysis ==
"Complexion" in line six, can have two meanings:

1. The outward appearance of the face as compared with the sun ("the eye of heaven") in the previous line, or
2. The older sense of the word in relation to the four humours.

In Shakespeare's time "complexion" carried both outward and inward meanings, as did the word "temperate" (externally, a weather condition; internally, a balance of humours). The second meaning of "complexion" would communicate that the beloved's inner, cheerful, and temperate disposition is constant, unlike the sun, which may be blotted out on a cloudy day. The first meaning is more obvious: a negative change in his outward appearance.

The word, "untrimmed" in line eight, can be taken two ways: First, in the sense of loss of decoration and frills, and second, in the sense of untrimmed sails on a ship. In the first interpretation, the poem reads that beautiful things naturally lose their fanciness over time. In the second, it reads that nature is a ship with sails not adjusted to wind changes in order to correct course. This, in combination with the words "nature's changing course", creates an oxymoron: the unchanging change of nature, or the fact that the only thing that does not change is change. This line in the poem creates a shift from the mutability of the first eight lines, into the eternity of the last six. Both change and eternity are then acknowledged and challenged by the final line.

"Ow'st" in line ten can carry two meanings, each common at the time: "ownest" and "owest". "Owe", in Shakespeare's day, was sometimes used as a synonym for "own". However, "owest" conveys the idea that beauty is something borrowed from nature – that it must be paid back. In this interpretation, "fair" can be a pun on "fare", or the fare required by nature for life's journey. Other scholars have pointed out that this borrowing and lending theme within the poem is true of both nature and humanity. Summer, for example, is said to have a "lease" with "all too short a date". This monetary theme is common in many of Shakespeare's sonnets, as it was an everyday theme in his budding capitalistic society.

== Recordings ==
- Paul Kelly, for the 2016 album, Seven Sonnets & a Song
- Chuck Liddell Video on YouTube
- David Gilmour Video on YouTube
- Bryan Ferry, for the 1997 album Diana, Princess of Wales: Tribute
