= Emmaus Mouvement =

Emmaüs Mouvement

Compilation album by Various artists
- Released: November 1999
- Genre: Chanson, folk, Pop, Reggae, Rock
- Label: Virgin
- Producer: Julien Civange

Emmaüs Mouvement: 1949–1999 Emmaüs a 50 ans is a compilation album for the 50th anniversary of the Emmaüs Mouvement, founded by Abbé Pierre in 1949.

== Background and recording ==
After many encounters with Abbé Pierre, musician and producer Julien Civange proposed to add his contribution to the 50th anniversary of the Emmaüs Mouvement by gathering together on one album a number of different musicians who supported the idea behind the Emmaüs Mouvement — that is to say, the fight against all forms of exclusion. However, there was one condition — that every musician had to create a specific piece of music for the occasion or offer an as yet unpublished/unrecorded work.

Jean-Louis Aubert composed a very beautiful song "Veille sur moi", Stephan Eicher recorded a duet with the group Bratsch, Joe Strummer improvised a folk cover version of "Junco Partner", Linton Kwesi Johnson did a duet with Shurik'n and Imothep of the group IAM, Marianne Faithfull recorded the poems of Shakespeare, the group Les Rita Mitsouko recorded "Le Juste Prix", and Rachid Taha offered "54". Manu Chao, the groups "Air", Cassius, Mars IV, Les Négresses Vertes, and FFF, and Howie B also participated in the album.

The album was released in November 1999 through Virgin Records France.

== Reception ==
To celebrate the event, the French media got involved in the promotion of the album, through speaking about it and offering space and airtime. Also with the participation of FNAC, a launching concert was organised in FNAC Champs-Élysées, collecting together Jean-Louis Aubert, Stephane Eicher, and Linton Kwesi Johnson, who all performed in front of a packed-out audience whilst under the watchful eye of Abbé Pierre.

Raymond Depardon made the promotional film for the album. Thanks to a competition by Steven Rubin, Fuji Laboratories, and the film director David Fincher (Seven, The Game) 450 reels of film were released throughout France and shown just before the movie Fight Club.

The album was well received by both the public and the press, and therefore achieved its goal: for Emmaüs Mouvement to touch a wide public particularly young people whilst celebrating its 50th anniversary through music.

== Track listing ==
No.	Title	Writer(s)	Performer	Length
1.	"Veille Sur Moi"	Jean-Louis Aubert	Jean-Louis Aubert	4:14
2.	"Tek Chance"	Geoffroy Mussard, Linton Kwesi, Pascal Perez	Linton Kwesi Johnson feat. Shurik'n and Imothep	4:06
3.	"Tous les jours"	Manu Chao	Manu Chao	3:23
4.	"Sonnet 14"	William Shakespeare	Marianne Faithfull	1:04
5.	"Le Juste Prix"	Catherine Ringer, Fred Chichin	Les Rita Mitsouko	4:06
6.	"Ceux à qui ça va bien"	Mani Matter, Pierre Geering (transl.), arr. by Bratsch, Ronan Le Bars, and Stephan Eicher	Stephan Eicher and Bratsch	2:19
7.	"Remember (Strings version)"	Jean-Benoît Dunckel, Jean-Jacques Perrey, Nicolas Godin, David Whitaker (strings arr.)	Air	2:23
8.	"Amnésie internationale"	Marco Prince, Marta Marugan, FFF		6:19
9.	"Junco Partner"	Traditional, arr. by Joe Strummer	Joe Strummer	2:33
10.	"54"	Rachid Taha, Rabah Mezouane, Bruno Maman	Rachid Taha	4:07
11.	"Club 73"	Boom Bass, Philippe Zdar	Cassius	4:03
12.	"Ne reste pas seul"	Mars IV	Mars IV	3:14
13.	"Leaving Home"	Howard Bernstein	Howie B	3:49
14.	"Bamboo Land"	Bamboo Man, Jean-Louis Aubert	Bamboo Man feat. Jean-Louis Aubert	1:55
15.	"Trabendo"	Howie B, Iza Mellino, Jean-Marie Paulus, Matias Canavese, Michel Estrade, Ochowlack, Stéfane Mellino	Les Négresses Vertes	5:20

== Personnel ==
1. "Veille sur moi"
  - Jean-Louis Aubert – bass, guitar, keyboards, vocals, lyrics and music
  - Manu Katché – drums
  - Le Baron guitar
  - Dominique Blanc-Francard (DBF) – mixing
  - Bénédicte Schmitt – recording
2. "Tek Chance"
  - Lyrics by Geoffroy Mussard, Linton Kwesi Johnson
  - Music by Pascal Perez
  - Linton Kwesi Johnson, Shurik'n and Imothep – performers
  - Philippe Beneytout – recording and mixing
3. "Tous les jours"
  - Manu Chao lyrics, music, performer, recording, and co-production
  - Renaud Letang – recording and co-production
4. "Sonnet 14"
  - William Shakespeare – writer
  - Marianne Faithfull – performer
5. "Le Juste Prix"
  - Fred Chichin – guitar, music
  - Catherine Ringer – keyboards, vocals, lyrics
  - Dominique Blanc-Francard (DBF) – mixing
  - Les Rita Mitsouko – performers
  - Bénédicte Schmitt – mixing assistant
  - Ayodele "Ski" Shekoni – programming and producer
6. "Ceux à qui ça va bien" ("Dene wos guet geit")
  - François Castellio – accordion
  - Bratsch – arrangement
  - Stephan Eicher – arrangement, vocals
  - Ronan Le Bars – arrangement, bagpipes
  - Nano Peylet – clarinet
  - Pierre Jacquet – double bass
  - Dan Gharibian – guitar
  - Mani Matter – lyrics and music
  - Pierre Geering – lyrics (translation)
  - Bruno Girard – violin
  - Pascal Colomb – recording
  - Jeff Ginouves – recording assistant
7. "Remember (Version Corde)" (strings version)
  - Air performers
  - David Whitaker – conductor, strings arrangement
  - Lyrics by Jean-Benoît Dunckel, Jean-Jacques Perrey, and Nicolas Godin
  - Music by Jean-Benoît Dunckel and Nicolas Godin
  - Alex Gopher – mastering
  - Stéphane "Alf" Briat – mixing
8. "Amnésie internationale"
  - FFF – performers, music
  - Lyrics by Marco Prince and Marta Marugan
  - Marta Marugan – vocals (Spanish voice)
  - Yarol Poupaud – recording and mixing
  - Freddy Martineau – recording assistant, mixing assistant
9. "Junco Partner"
  - Joe Strummer performer, arrangement
10. "54"
  - Rachid Taha – lyrics, music, and vocals
  - Bruno Maman – acoustic guitar, bass, music
  - Abdelouab Abrit Goblet – drums
  - Hassan Lachal – drum (derbouka)
  - Steve Hillage – electric guitar
  - Hakim Hamadouche – lute
  - Rabah Mezouane – lyrics translation
  - Frédéric Blanc-Garin – recording
  - Antoine Gaillet – recording assistant
  - Pete Hofmann – mixing
  - Barny – mixing assistant
11. "Club 73"
  - Cassius – performers
  - Written by Boom Bass and Philippe Zdar
12. "Ne reste pas seul"
  - Mars IV writers, performers
  - Pete Hofmann – mixing
  - Greg Flemming – mixing assistant
  - Programmed by James Bambury and Yul
13. "Leaving Home"
  - Howie B – performer and writer (as Howard Bernstein)
14. "Bamboo Land"
  - Bamboo Man – performer and writer (lyrics)
  - Jean-Louis Aubert – featured performer and writer (music and lyrics)
15. "Trabendo"
  - Les Négresses Vertes – performers
  - Written by Howie B, Iza Mellino, Jean-Marie Paulus, Matias Canavese, Michel Estrade, Ochowlack, Stéfane Mellino
  - Howie B – producer and mixing
  - Co-produced by Jeremy Shaw and Will O'Donovan
- Julien Civange – executive producer
- Elise Luguern – executive producer assistant
- Mastered by – John Davis and Tim Young
- Virgin France – label and distributor
- Raymond Depardon – promo film
- Russ – artwork (front painting)
- Design by Antoine Leroux and Polux
