= Music in space =

Music from a spacecraft in outer space

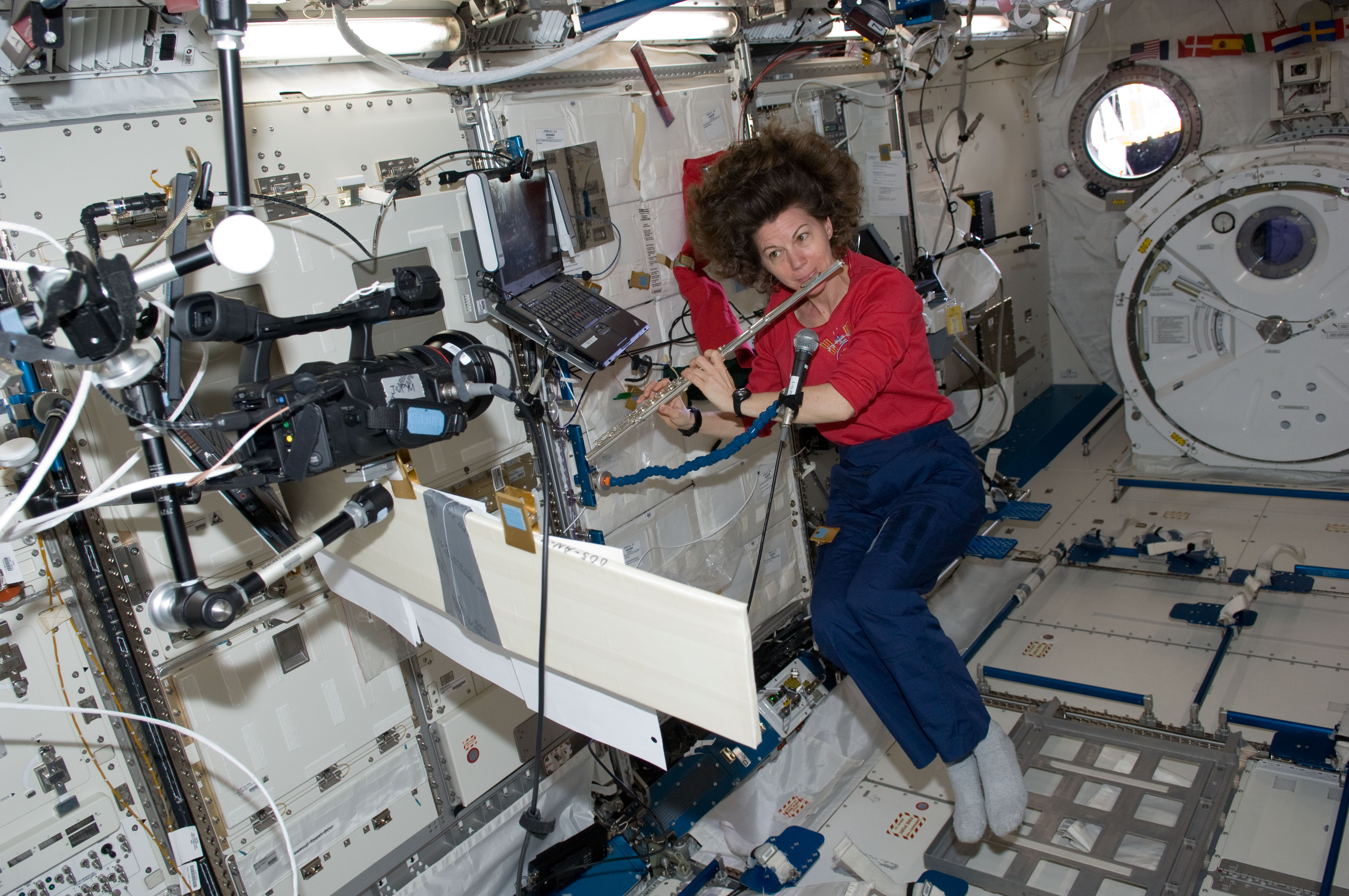
NASA astronaut Catherine Coleman plays a flute aboard the International Space Station in 2011.

Music in space is music played in or broadcast from a spacecraft in outer space. The first ever song that was performed in space was a Ukrainian song “Watching the sky and thinking a thought” (Ukrainian: «Дивлюсь я на небо та й думку гадаю») sung on 12 August 1962 by Pavel Popovich at a special request of Sergei Korolev. According to the Smithsonian Institution, the first musical instruments played in outer space were an 8-note Hohner "Little Lady" harmonica and a handful of small bells carried by American astronauts Wally Schirra and Thomas P. Stafford aboard Gemini 6A. Upon achieving a space rendezvous in Earth orbit with their sister ship Gemini 7 in December 1965, Schirra and Stafford played a rendition of "Jingle Bells" over the radio after jokingly claiming to have seen an unidentified flying object piloted by Santa Claus. The instruments had been smuggled on-board without NASA's knowledge, leading Mission Control director Elliot See to exclaim "You're too much" to Schirra after the song. The harmonica was donated to the Smithsonian by Schirra in 1967, with his note that it "...plays quite well".

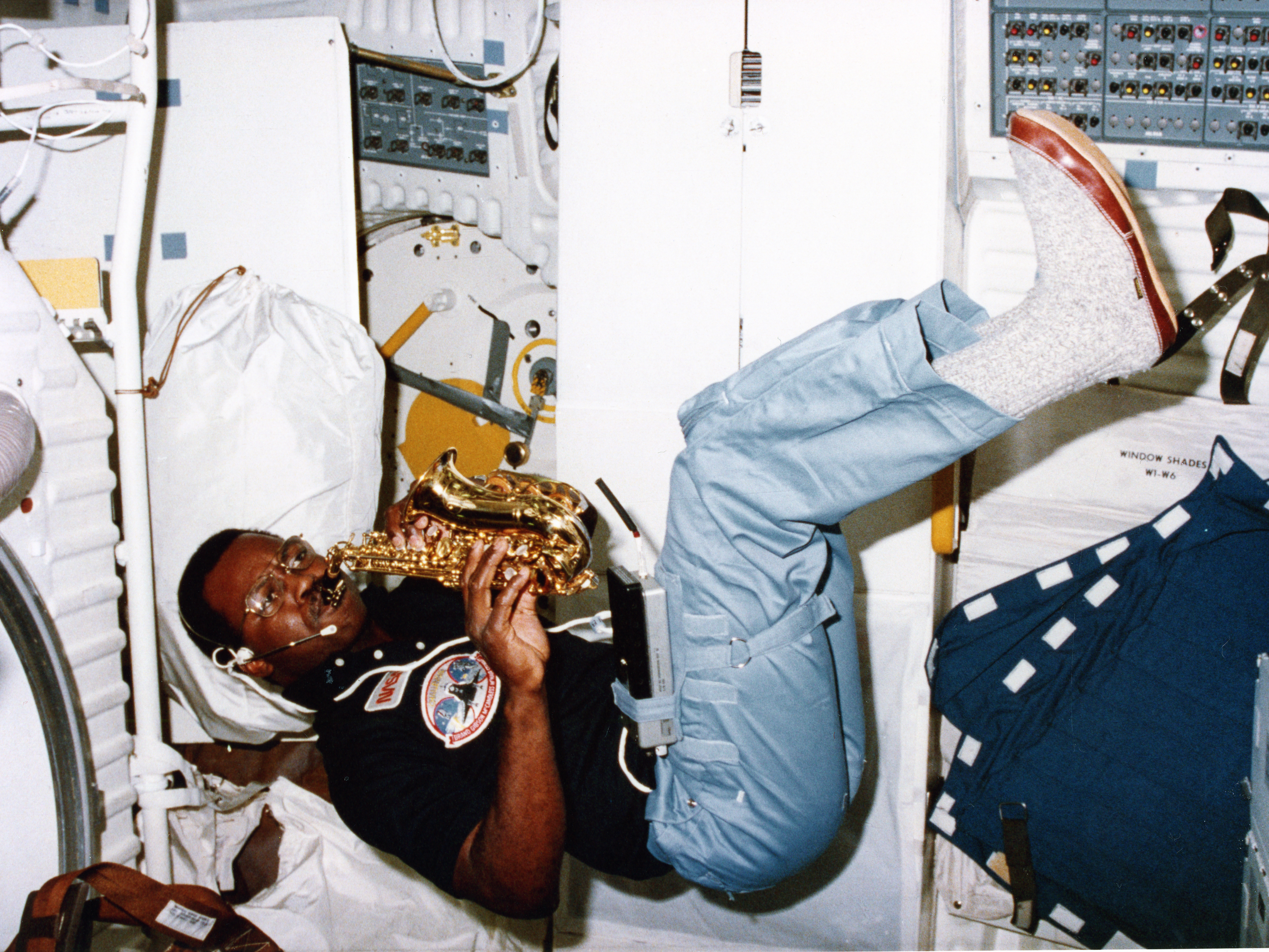
NASA astronaut Ronald McNair plays a saxophone aboard Space Shuttle Mission 41-B in 1984.

In the 1970s music tape cassettes were brought to the American space station Skylab, while Soviet cosmonauts Aleksandr Laveikin and Yuri Romanenko brought a guitar to the space station Mir in 1987. Musical instruments must be checked for gases they may emit before being taken aboard the confined environment of a space station. As of 2003, instruments that have been aboard the International Space Station include a flute, a keyboard, a guitar, a saxophone, and a didgeridoo.

Music in space has been a focal point of public relation events of various human spaceflight programs. NASA astronaut Carl Walz played a rendition of the Elvis Presley song "Heartbreak Hotel" aboard the ISS in 2003 which was also recorded and transmitted to Earth. Canadian Space Agency astronaut Chris Hadfield, commander of Expedition 35 to the International Space Station, recorded a music video of the song "Space Oddity" by David Bowie aboard the space station. The first music video ever shot in space, the video went viral and received widespread international media coverage after being posted to YouTube. Bowie himself later called the cover "possibly the most poignant version of the song ever created". Hadfield also recorded his own album titled Space Sessions: Songs from a Tin Can.

== Dongfanghong I ==
Dongfanghong I (simplified Chinese: 东方红一号; traditional Chinese: 東方紅一號; pinyin: Dōngfānghóng Yīhào; lit. 'The East is Red 1') was the People's Republic of China's first space satellite, launched successfully on 24 April 1970 as part of the PRC's Dongfanghong space satellite program. The satellite carried a radio transmitter which broadcast the song of the same name, Dōngfānghóng or "The East Is Red"; the broadcast lasted for 20 days while in orbit.

== Apollo 17 ==
A few bars of "The Fountain in the Park" were sung on the Moon by NASA Astronauts Harrison Schmitt and Eugene Cernan on the 1972 Apollo 17 mission, the final Apollo moon mission. Schmitt started by singing "I was strolling on the Moon one day..." after which Cernan joined in. Cernan kept with the original "merry month of May", however, while Schmitt sang "December", which was the actual date at the time. Cernan interjected, "No, May!", and Schmitt corrected himself. Schmitt resumed, singing "When much to my surprise, a pair of bonny eyes..." until he could no longer remember the lyrics and began vocalizing the notes instead. Moments later, Capsule Communicator Robert A. Parker cut in from Houston, punningly saying that "sorry, guys, but today may be December."

== Voyager Golden Record ==
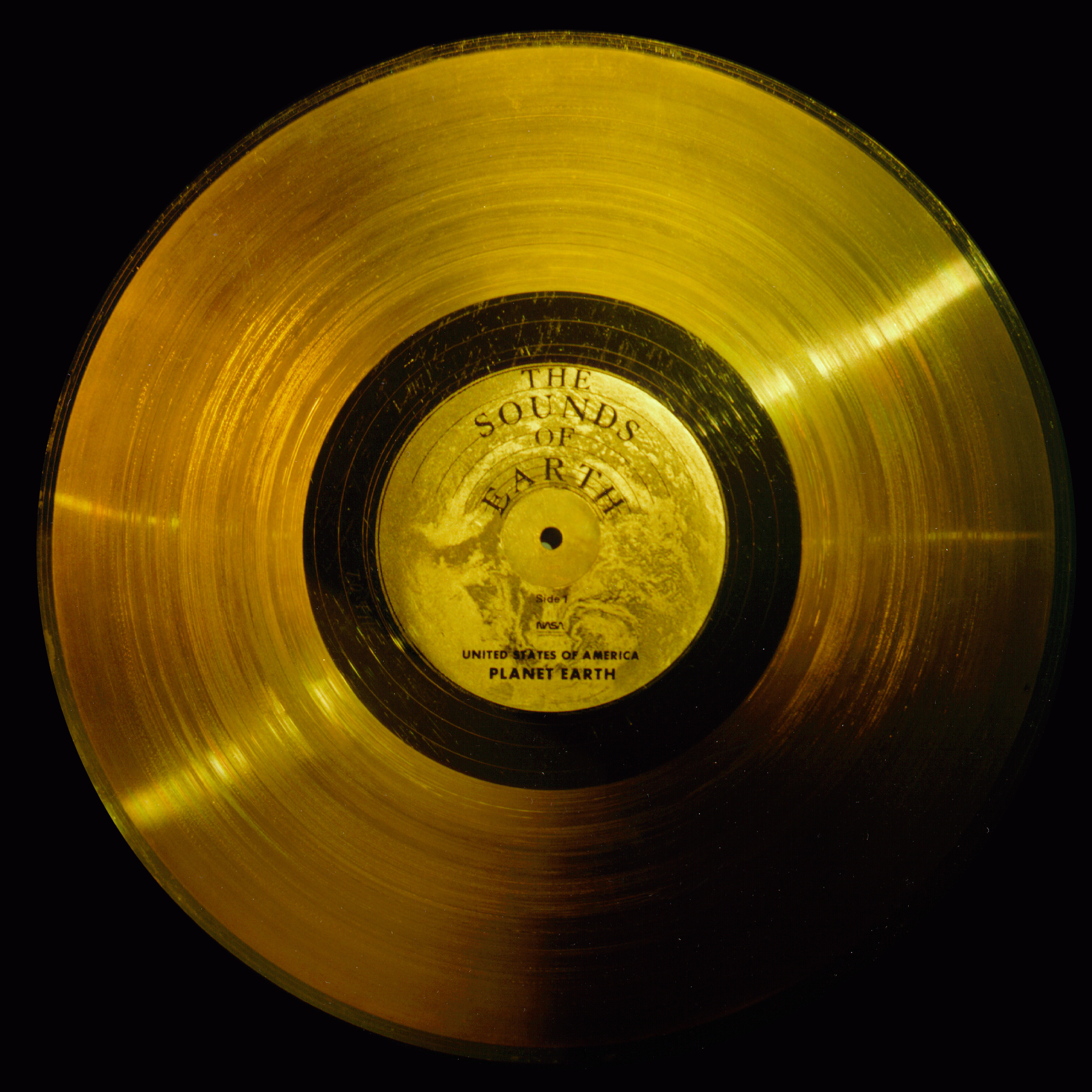
The music is recorded in the circular grooves of this disc, which was attached to the spacecraft(s)

The Voyager program probes Voyager 1 and Voyager 2 were launched by NASA with a message aboard — a kind of time capsule, intended to communicate a story of the world of humans on Earth.

This is a present from a small, distant world, a token of our sounds, our science, our images, our music, our thoughts and our feelings. We are attempting to survive our time so we may live into yours.

— President Jimmy Carter

The records feature spoken greetings in fifty-nine languages, "sounds of Earth", and a 90-minute selection of music from many cultures, including Eastern and Western classics.

== Soyuz TM-3 and Didier Marouani ==
On 22 July 1987, Soyuz TM-3 was the third crewed spaceflight to visit the Soviet space station Mir. The cosmonauts took a CD-player with them, together with two small speakers and the Space Opera album by French composer Didier Marouani. According to Marouani, the CD, the player and speakers were launched into outer space in October 1987. Cosmonaut Aleksandr Pavlovich Aleksandrov confirmed that he listened to the album during his mission on Mir.

== Soyuz TM-7 and Pink Floyd ==
On 21 November 1988, a cassette tape of Pink Floyd's live Delicate Sound of Thunder album (minus the cassette box, for weight reasons) was taken into space by the crew of the Soviet Soyuz TM-7 mission. The launch, at Baikonur Cosmodrome, was attended by the band's David Gilmour and Nick Mason, who made an audio recording of the event for potential use in a future project. This was claimed by Gilmour to have been the first rock music recording in space. In actuality, various cassettes carried by Al Worden on Apollo 15 nearly two decades earlier contained recordings from multiple various rock artists. The tape was left on the Mir space station when the mission crew returned to Earth.

== Beagle 2 and Blur ==
In 2003 the British space organization's Beagle 2 probe was scheduled to play a song from the British rock band Blur, upon touchdown on the planet Mars. It was not known what happened to Beagle 2 for 11 years after landing, and it was considered lost. When it was found intact in 2015, however, the possibility was raised that Beagle 2 had successfully played the song on Christmas Day in 2003 upon landing, but failed to transmit back to Earth. The song, also called "Beagle 2", was composed for the project and had been issued as the B-side of the band's 1999 "No Distance Left to Run" single prior to the launch.

== Curiosity and will.i.am ==
American recording artist will.i.am wrote, produced, and recorded the song "Reach for the Stars" (and their instrumental-driven version subtitled "Mars Edition" and "NASA Edition") in commemoration of the landing of the Curiosity rover on Mars. The song was first released on August 28, 2012, and it became the first song that was successfully broadcast from another planet.

== Chris Hadfield's Space Sessions: Songs from a Tin Can ==
During his time on the International Space Station Commander Chris Hadfield recorded twelve songs. One was a recording of David Bowie's Space Oddity, ten were originals by him, and "Beyond the Terra" was written by him and his son. He released the album as Space Sessions: Songs from a Tin Can in 2015.

== Elon Musk's Tesla Roadster ==
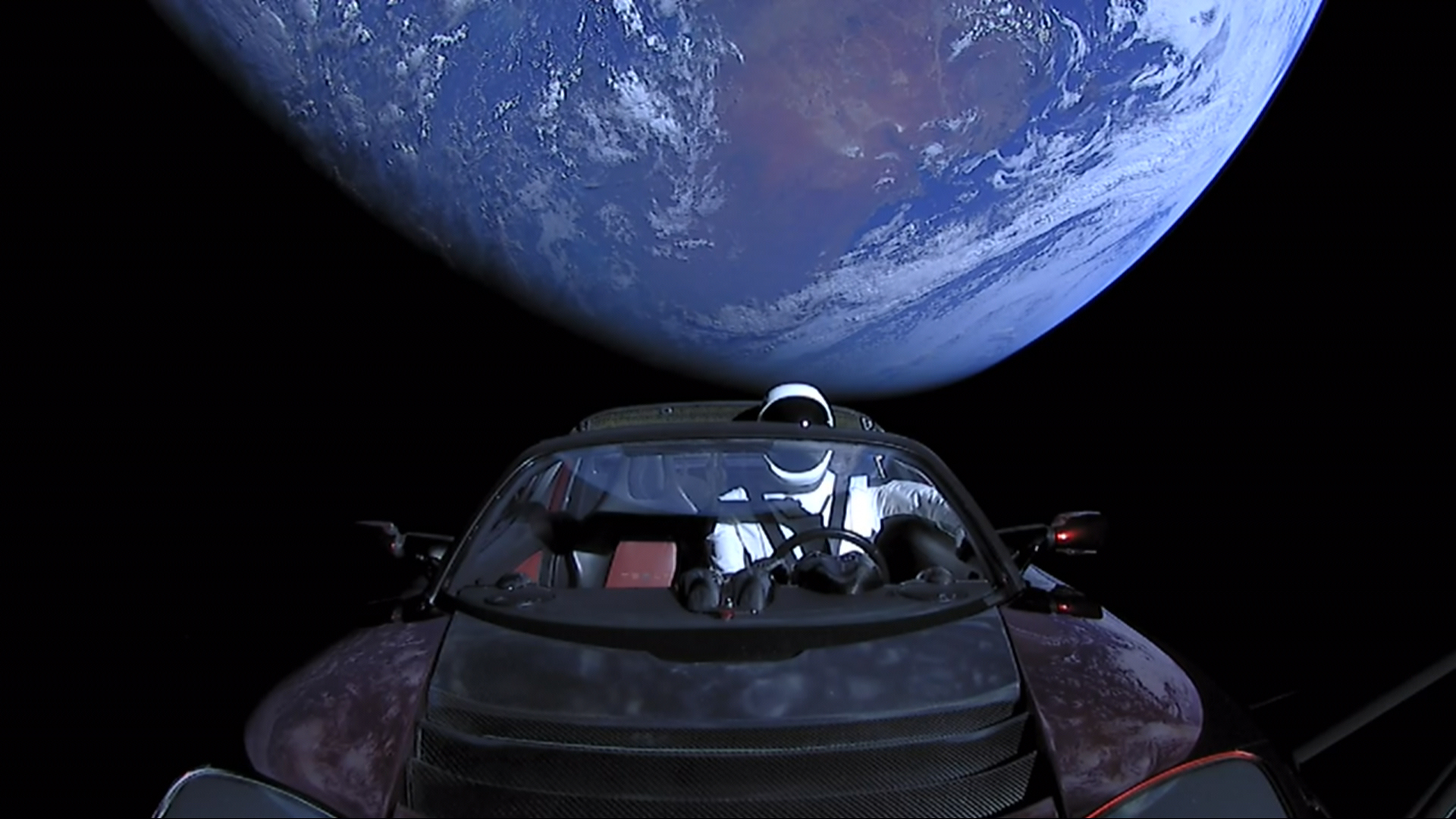
"Starman" prop rocks out to Bowie en route to the Asteroid belt

Elon Musk's Tesla Roadster was launched into Earth orbit, then Solar orbit, in February 2018 as part of the Falcon Heavy Test Flight. The sound system on board the car was looping David Bowie's songs "Space Oddity" and "Life on Mars?".

== Project DaVinci and Taylor Swift ==
As a part of NASA's ElaNa 19 initiative, 18 year-old millionaire Erik Finman collaborated with a team of high school students from Coeur d'Alene, Idaho, and designed a CubeSat named Project DaVinci. The CubeSat serves as a time capsule orbiting around the Earth, and contains a collection of videos, music and movies, including Taylor Swift's 2014 album, 1989. The album was uploaded to the satellite, while its Swift-autographed CD was engraved to the satellite's side. DaVinci was launched into space on December 16, 2018, from Mahia, New Zealand.

== ISS and Coldplay ==
On 7 May 2021, British rock band Coldplay premiered their new single "Higher Power" from the International Space Station by having French European Space Agency astronaut Thomas Pesquet preview the song via a branded "extraterrestrial transmission". The album from which the song originates, Music of the Spheres, is a space-themed concept album.

== Shenzhou 13 ==
In Lantern Festival, February 2022, during Shenzhou 13 mission on Tiangong space station, two Chinese astronauts played traditional Chinese musical instruments. Wang Yaping played "Mo Li Hua" (Chinese: 茉莉花) on the guzheng, while Ye Guangfu played the Dai ethnic song "Fernleaf Hedge Bamboo In the Moonlight" (Chinese: 月光下的凤尾竹) on the hulusi.

== Danuri ==
To test the experimental system of the “space Internet”, Danuri (Korea Pathfinder Lunar Orbiter) successfully forwarded a number of photos taken, as well as several video files, including, BTS’ “Dynamite” from outer space to Earth at Korea's Ministry of Science and ICT, Korea Aerospace Research Institute (KARI), and the Electronics and Telecommunications Research Institute (ETRI) on 7 November 2022.

== Hakuto-R ==
Hakuto-R houses a payload, that is, a music disc featuring the song ‘SORATO’ by the Japanese rock band Sakanaction. The song was initially released in 2018 as a part of the Team Hakuto campaign for the Google Lunar XPRIZE.

== SpaceX Polaris Dawn ==
On Friday, September 13, 2024, during the Polaris Dawn mission, SpaceX Engineer Sarah Gillis performed a violin solo from Rey's Theme from Star Wars: The Force Awakens. Gillis was joined by young musicians around the world. The performance was used to raise money for El Sistema.

== Echo and the Bunnymen aboard the International Space Station ==
In June 2009, NASA astronaut Colonel Timothy Kopra took a signed copy of Echo & the Bunnymen's 1984 classic, Ocean Rain, with him on a mission to the International Space Station. Ian McCulloch (singer) declared them the "coolest band in the universe," and recalled his childhood dream of becoming an astronaut, of which he claimed was finally made true.

== See also ==
- Space-themed music
- Space music
- Music2titan
