= Music2titan =

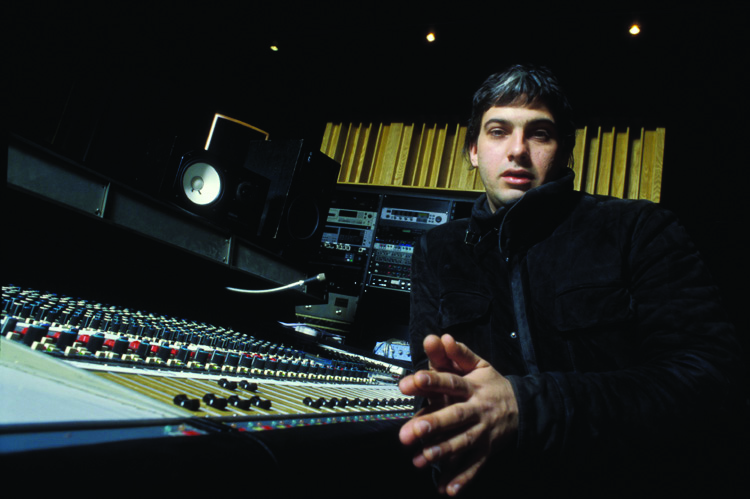

Composition by Julien Civange and Louis Haeri
- Released: October 1997
- Composer(s): Julien Civange and Louis Haeri

Music2titan is the name given to four musical themes composed by French musicians Julien Civange and Louis Haeri that were placed on board ESA's Huygens probe in October 1997. "Hot Time", "Bald James Deans", "Lalala" and "No Love" reached Titan, a moon of Saturn, in January 2005 after a seven-year, four-billion-kilometre (2.5×10^{9}-mile) journey.

== See also ==
- Music in space
