= Born HIV Free =

- Founded: May 19, 2010
- Type: Development Advocacy
- Headquarters: Geneva, Switzerland
- Key people: Carla Bruni-Sarkozy (Ambassador), Michel Kazatchkine (Executive Director of the Global Fund), Julien Civange (Conceptor of the campaign), Paul McCartney, U2, Amy Winehouse, Jean-Paul Gaultier
- Website: BornHIVFree.org

The Born HIV Free campaign was created by the Global Fund to mobilize public support for the organizations work and for "a world where no child is born with HIV by 2015." This campaign was originated and supported by Carla Bruni-Sarkozy, a Global Fund Ambassador. The Global Fund called this "one of the most ambitious campaigns of its kind," in its 2010 news release.

== Background ==
After decades of neglect, promotion of prevention of mother-to-child transmission of HIV (the virus that causes AIDS in those infected) has acquired new urgency. In 2005, representatives of governments, multilateral agencies, development partners, research institutions, civil society and people living with HIV signed on to a Call to Action, urging other governments, development partners, civil society and private sector to join them in moving swiftly to support specific strategies and measures needed to eliminate HIV in infants and young children.

By December 2008, 45 percent of pregnant HIV-positive women were being reached with preventative treatment (“Prevention of mother-to-child transmission (PMTCT) of HIV. With sustained investment PMTCT coverage could reach 100% by 2015. “If the momentum of the last decade is maintained... it might be possible to virtually eliminate transmission of HIV from mothers to their children." In Africa alone, 400,000 babies were born with HIV in 2009, despite the fact that we have the means to prevent transmission - Michel Kazatchkine, executive director of the Global Fund, called this an outrage at a ministerial meeting in Yaoundé, Cameroon on 8 May 2010.

The Global Fund currently provides funding for well over half of all activities worldwide to help HIV-positive mothers in preventing that HIV is transferred to their children.

== Born HIV Free campaign ==
Originated and supported by Carla Bruni-Sarkozy the Born HIV Free campaign was conceived by musician and producer Julien Civange.

The campaign was launched in Paris, at the "Espace Pierre Cardin" on May 19, 2010 to spread awareness of the struggle to create an AIDS-free generation by 2015 and to garner popular support for its continued donor financing. The campaign asks people to show their support for this goal and to endorse their country’s contribution to the Global Fund by signing their name on the campaign's web site.

The campaign draws attention to one of the many ambitious and realizable goals the world can accomplish if it continues to increase investments in global health. By signing up on “the virtual wall of support” people can signal to their country’s government that they approve of the use of public resources to fight these global pandemics.

Designed as an online and offline awareness campaign targeting the general public in Europe, and thanks to the unflagging commitment of strong partners - Google, YouTube, Orange, MSN, 43 Internet partner firms, 20 TV channels and 20 press groups in 11 European countries, bill-boarding (JC Decaux), entertainment companies (Live Nation, Vivendi) and fashion companies (Tiffany) – “Born HIV Free” has broadcast more than 2,7 billion messages of hope through banners, original films, posters, pins, events, and more. Partners helped convey a creative and educational campaign willingly embraced by world-class artists such as Paul McCartney, U2, Amy Winehouse and Jean-Paul Gaultier, together with up-and-coming young creative such as like H5 and the Bonzoms.

== Paul McCartney, U2, Amy Winehouse, Jean-Paul-Gaultier for Born HIV Free ==
On June 27, Paul McCartney threw his support behind the Born HIV Free campaign by allowing his concert at Hard Rock Calling in Hyde Park to be exclusive streamed through the Born HIV Free YouTube channel which has more than 11 million views. McCartney's donated set was the first European show to be streamed live on YouTube. Thousands watched and signed the Born HIV Free petition.

Amy Winehouse offered the use of her song "Back to Black" for the Bonzom's movie baby in the skye.

U2 offered the use of their song "With or Without You" for the movie inside. Also, during the U2 concert at the Stade de France Saturday, September 18, 2010, Bono dedicated “Moment of Surrender,” from latest album No Line on the Horizon to the fight against AIDS, calling spectators and internet users to support (RED), ONE and Born HIV Free in their efforts to have in 2015 a generation of children born without HIV. The track is up online, with Bono’s introduction illustrated by pictures of the concert and images on the transmission of the virus from mother to child.

Jean-Paul Gaultier created a special Born HIV Free "marinière"

== Born HIV Free in numbers ==
“Born HIV Free” has reached about 250 million people. The dedicated channel on YouTube and dedicated website received over 20 million hits, tens of thousands of messages of support and generated thousands of articles. With the help of advocacy partners such as Avaaz and ONE more than 700,000 people signed the petition launched in line with this campaign.

The first step of the Born HIV Free campaign ended in New-York on October 5, 2010, following the pledges made by donors to the Global Fund for the subsequent three years (2011-2013). The USD11.7 billion that was pledged to the Global Fund marked the largest collective pledge in its history. However, the total pledges fell short of the estimated resources needed to meet demand from developing countries seeking to further scale up their disease programs.

== Global ambassador ==
Carla Bruni-Sarkozy, First Lady of France, became a global ambassador for the protection of mothers and children against AIDS in December 2008. In her capacity as ambassador, Bruni-Sarkozy acts as a voice on the global stage for the many mothers and children infected with or affected by HIV/AIDS, especially drawing attention to the need to give pregnant women and their children the means to prevent HIV infection and to fight the disease.

Since taking up her role as ambassador, she has led a number of activities to raise awareness and call for action against HIV and AIDS. In February 2009, she travelled to Burkina Faso to visit Global Fund-supported programs; in September 2009, she called upon world leaders at the UN General Assembly to eliminate mother to child transmission of HIV by 2015; on World AIDS Day she publicly emphasized the need to end mother-to-child transmission worldwide; and in January 2010, together with Melinda Gates, she visited Global Fund-supported programs in Benin to promote the need to invest in women and children’s health.
