= Sonnet 17 =

« » Sonnet 17
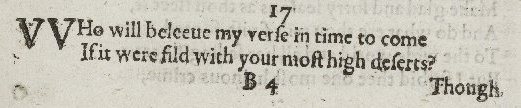
- The first two lines of Sonnet 17 in the 1609 Quarto
Q1
Q2
Q3
C
Who will believe my verse in time to come,
If it were fill’d with your most high deserts?
Though yet, heaven knows, it is but as a tomb
Which hides your life and shows not half your parts.
If I could write the beauty of your eyes
And in fresh numbers number all your graces,
The age to come would say “This poet lies;
Such heavenly touches ne’er touch’d earthly faces.”
So should my papers, yellowed with their age,
Be scorn’d like old men of less truth than tongue,
And your true rights be term’d a poet’s rage
And stretched metre of an antique song:
But were some child of yours alive that time,
You should live twice, in it and in my rhyme.
—William Shakespeare
4
8
12
14

Sonnet 17 is one of 154 sonnets written by the English playwright and poet William Shakespeare. It is the final poem of what are referred to by scholars as the procreation sonnets (Sonnets 1-17) with which the Fair Youth sequence opens.

Sonnet 17 questions the poet's descriptions of the sequence's young man, believing that future generations will see these descriptions as exaggerations, if the youth does not make a copy of himself by fathering a child. As in Sonnet 130, Shakespeare shows himself to be hesitant about self-assured, flamboyant, and flowery proclamations of beauty.

== Structure ==
Sonnet 17 is an English or Shakespearean sonnet, consisting of three quatrains followed by a couplet. It follows the form's typical rhyme scheme: abab cdcd efef gg. Sonnet 17 is written in iambic pentameter, a form of meter based on five pairs of metrically weak/strong syllabic positions. The sonnet's fourth line exemplifies a regular iambic pentameter:

  ×    /     ×    /    ×     /    ×   /    ×    / 
Which hides your life, and shows not half your parts. (17.4)

/ = ictus, a metrically strong syllabic position. × = nonictus. (×) = extrametrical syllable.

The sixth line exhibits two fairly common variations, a final extrametrical syllable or feminine ending, and the rightward movement of the first ictus (the resulting four-position figure, × × / /, is sometimes referred to as a minor ionic):

×   ×    /    /  ×    /  ×  /    ×     /(×) 
And in fresh numbers number all your graces, (17.6)

The twelfth line features a mimetic stretching into two syllables of the word "stretched" to fit the metre:

×      /   ×   / ×  /  ×  /  ×     / 
And stretchèd metre of an antique song: (17.12)

== Synopsis and analysis ==
The poet asks who would believe his verse in the future ("in time to come"), if the youth's true excellence ("most high deserts") were to "fill" his verse. The poet's verse is inadequate; "heaven knows" is either an exclamation or part of the sentence: 'heaven knows that his verse is but a tomb' (with a hint of 'tome'). Shakespeare even goes as far as to say that the "tomb" hides half the youth's beauty.

Shakespeare argues that his descriptions are not strong enough, and do not do justice to the man's beauty ("If I could write the beauty of your eyes"). Again, if the poet could number all the youth's graces in "fresh numbers," then future times would accuse him of falsehood. Future ages would say, "this poet lies; / Such heavenly touches ne'er touch'd earthly faces." "Such heavenly touches" were the divine touches traditionally bestowed by the Muses on the poet, or they are the strokes of the brush or chisel of a divinely inspired hand, which, having 'touched' an earthly face, makes it perfect.

As in Sonnet 85 Shakespeare's precedent is a phrase from Horace's Satires, "ad unguem / factus homo" (Sermones 1.5.32) 'it is the touch that perfects the man,' which was an expression from carvers who in modelling gave the finishing touch to their work with the nail ("unguem"). A future age, believing that such divine perfection could never ("ne'er") happen, would think the poet's efforts exaggeration. Shakespeare insists that his comparisons, even though they are limited in strength, are not exaggerations.

The poet's manuscripts ("my papers"), once they are discolored ("yellowed") with age, will be the subject of ridicule ("scorn'd"), just as "old men of less truth then tongue" are derided. What the youth is truly owed ("your true rights") could be dismissed in the future as "a poet's rage," or rejected as the "stretched metre of an antique song"; "stretched" firstly intends 'exaggerated,' but was used technically of earlier poetic styles. "Antique song" is both ancient and distorted ('antic') song. The sonnet ends with a typical notion that should the young man have a child, he shall live both in the child and in the poet's rhyme.

== Interpretations ==
- Richard Attenborough, for the 2002 compilation album, When Love Speaks (EMI Classics)
- "The stretched metre of an antique song" is the epigraph to Endymion by John Keats
