= La Place (band) =

- Origin: Paris, France
- Years active: 1989–1997
- Members: Julien Civange, Louis Haeri, Yan Van Uden

La Place was a Rock band based in Paris, France (1989–1997). At 16, Julien Civange and school friend Louis Haeri created the band. In its very first version the band sounds like a mix of punk energy and funk music.

David Bowie who wanted the "best beginners band of the moment" invited La Place as an opening band for his concert with Tin Machine at La Cigale (1989).

Following a Tour Sauvage and hundreds of live shows before various change of line-up the band spent four years working in a basement, from which they emerged to make seven concerts with Simple Minds (April–May 1995). Two months after, they were invited by the Rolling Stones at the Paris Olympia (July 1995).

After this concerts, the band who had never had a label until then signed with an indie one (La Bande Son Canal +) and recorded their first and last album.

== Concerts as an opening band ==
- David Bowie & Tin Machine - La Cigale (Paris) - June 25th1989
- Simple Minds - French Tour (Zénith de Montpellier, Palais des sports de Lille...) - April–May 1995
- Womack and Womack - Festival d'Annecy - July 1989
- Primal Scream - New Morning (Paris) & MJC de Joué les Tours - 1990
- Jean-Louis Aubert -Olympia (Paris) - May 1990
- The Rolling Stones - Olympia (Paris) - July 3, 1995

== Discography ==
- La Place - La Place - First and last Album
- Label : La Bande Son - Canal +
- Produced by : Kirk Yano
- Release Date : October 1996

== Articles, References & Sources ==
- Le Monde - article de Véronique Mortaigne et Thomas Sotinel du 23 juin 1990 (culture)
- Le Monde - article de Christophe de Caevel du 5 juillet 1990 (société)
- Le Monde - article de Stéphane Davet du 5 juillet 1995 (culture)
- France 2 - 8 O'clock News - July 3, 1995
