= Sonnet 16 =

« » Sonnet 16
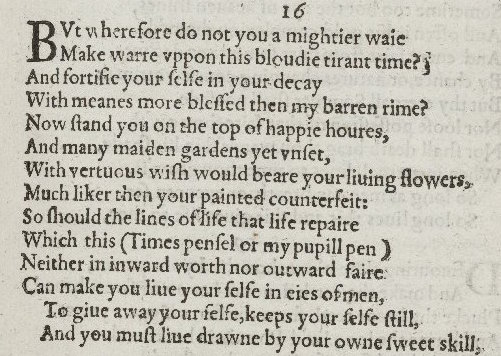
- Sonnets 16 in the 1609 Quarto
Q1
Q2
Q3
C
But wherefore do not you a mightier way
Make war upon this bloody tyrant, Time?
And fortify yourself in your decay
With means more blessed than my barren rhyme?
Now stand you on the top of happy hours,
And many maiden gardens, yet unset,
With virtuous wish would bear your living flowers
Much liker than your painted counterfeit:
So should the lines of life that life repair,
Which this time’s pencil, or my pupil pen,
Neither in inward worth nor outward fair,
Can make you live yourself in eyes of men.
To give away yourself keeps yourself still;
And you must live, drawn by your own sweet skill.
—William Shakespeare
4
8
12
14

Sonnet 16 is one of 154 sonnets written by the English playwright and poet William Shakespeare. It is among those sonnets referred to as the procreation sonnets, within the Fair Youth sequence.

Although the previous sonnet, Sonnet 15, does not overtly discuss procreation, Sonnet 16 opens with "But..." and goes on to make the encouragement clear. The two poems form a diptych. In Sonnet 16, the speaker asks the young man why he does not actively fight against time and age by having a child.

== Structure ==
Sonnet 16 is an English or Shakespearean sonnet. This type of sonnet consists of three quatrains followed by a couplet. It follows the English sonnet's typical rhyme scheme: ABAB CDCD EFEF GG. The sonnet is written in iambic pentameter, a type of metre in which each line is based on five pairs of metrically weak/strong syllabic positions. The fifth line exhibits a regular iambic pattern:

 ×    /    ×  /    ×  /  ×   / ×   / 
Now stand you on the top of happy hours, (16.5)

/ = ictus, a metrically strong syllabic position. × = nonictus.

Alternatively, "hours" (and its rhyme "flowers") may be scanned as two-syllable words, giving lines five and seven final extrametrical syllables or feminine endings.

== Synopsis and analysis ==
Sonnet 16 asks why the youth doesn't strive more forcefully ("a mightier way") to wage war against "this bloody tyrant time?" Why, the poet continues, doesn't the youth take precautions as he declines ("fortify your self in your decay") by some more fruitful ("blessed") means than the poet's own sterile efforts ("barren rhyme")?

The poet pictures the youth standing "on the top of happy hours", the time when the stars or the wheel of fortune blessed an individual. There, since the "happy hour" was used of both nuptials and childbirth, the youth controls the moment when he might beget children, as well as his destiny. On this note, a "maiden garden" is a womb yet to be made fruitful. To "set" a garden was to 'sow' it (compare Sonnet 15 where it is used of grafting) so that it can give birth to the youth's "living flowers," self-generated new copies.

Interpretation of the sonnet is said to hinge on the third quatrain (lines 9-12), which is generally regarded as obscure. Edmond Malone suggested that "lines of life" refers to children, with a pun on line as bloodline. This reading was accepted by Edward Dowden and others. Also, "repair" can mean to make anew or newly father (re + père), which may be relevant. But as well, "lines of life" can mean the length of life, or the fate-lines found on the hand and face read by fortune-tellers. An artistic metaphor also arises in this sonnet, and "lines" can be read in this context.

Line 10 is the source of some dissent amongst scholars. One reading is that, compared to his physical offspring (“this”), the depictions of time's pencil or the poet's novice pen ("pupil") are ineffectual. But it is the potential insight into the sonnets' chronology, through the relationship of "this" to "Time's pencil" and "my pupil pen", that is the focus of the debate: George Steevens regards the words as evidence Shakespeare wrote his sonnets as a youth; for T. W. Baldwin the phrase connects this sonnet to The Rape of Lucrece. While in general terms "Time" is in this line a form of artist (rather than a destroyer, as elsewhere in the cycle), its exact function is unclear. In Shakespeare's time, a pencil was both a small painter's brush and a tool to engrave letters, although graphite pencils bound in wax, string or even wood were known in the 16th century.

Following William Empson, Stephen Booth points out that all of the potential readings of the disputed lines, in particular the third quatrain, are potentially accurate: while the lines do not establish a single meaning, the reader understands in general terms the usual theme, the contrast between artistic and genealogical immortality. The assertion is that procreation is a more viable route to immortality than the "counterfeit" of art.

The sonnet concludes with resignation that the efforts of both time and the poet to depict the youth's beauty cannot bring the youth to life ("can make you live") in the eyes of men (compare the claim in Sonnet 81, line 8, "When you entombed in men's eyes shall lie"). By giving himself away in sexual union, or in marriage ("give away your self") the youth will paradoxically continue to preserve himself ("keeps your self still"). Continuing both the metaphor of pencils and lines, as well as the fatherly metaphor and that of fortune, the youth's lineage must be delineated ("drawn") by his own creative skill ("your own sweet skill").
