= Sonnet 43 =

« » Sonnet 43
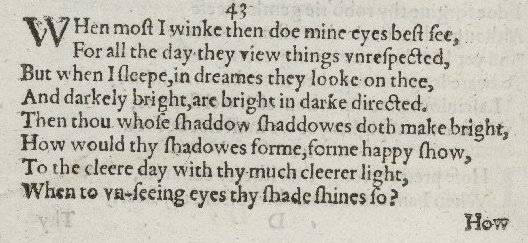
- The first two stanzas of Sonnet 43 in the 1609 Quarto
Q1
Q2
Q3
C
When most I wink, then do mine eyes best see,
For all the day they view things unrespected;
But when I sleep, in dreams they look on thee,
And, darkly bright, are bright in dark directed.
Then thou, whose shadow shadows doth make bright,
How would thy shadow’s form form happy show
To the clear day with thy much clearer light,
When to unseeing eyes thy shade shines so?
How would, I say, mine eyes be blessed made
By looking on thee in the living day,
When in dead night thy fair imperfect shade
Through heavy sleep on sightless eyes doth stay!
All days are nights to see till I see thee,
And nights bright days when dreams do show thee me.
—William Shakespeare
4
8
12
14

William Shakespeare's Sonnet 43 employs antithesis and paradox to highlight the speaker's yearning for his beloved and sadness in (most likely) their absence, and confusion about the situation described in the previous three sonnets. Sonnet 27 similarly deals with night, sleep, and dreams.

== Structure ==
Sonnet 43 is an English or Shakespearean sonnet. English sonnets contain three quatrains, followed by a final rhyming couplet. It follows the form's typical rhyme scheme, ABAB CDCD EFEF GG, and is written in iambic pentameter, a type of poetic metre based on five pairs of metrically weak/strong syllabic positions per line. The first line of the couplet exemplifies a regular iambic pentameter:

×    /   ×    /      ×  /   ×   /  ×    / 
All days are nights to see till I see thee, (43.13)

The second and fourth lines have a final extrametrical syllable or feminine ending:

×    /   ×   /     ×     /    ×   /    × / (×) 
And darkly bright, are bright in dark directed. (43.4)

/ = ictus, a metrically strong syllabic position. × = nonictus. (×) = extrametrical syllable.

== Source and analysis ==
This is one of the poems omitted from the pirated edition of 1640. Gerald Massey notes an analogous poem in Philip Sidney's Astrophil and Stella, 38.

Stephen Booth notes the concentration of antithesis used to convey the impression of a speaker whose emotions have inverted his perception of the world.

Edmond Malone glosses "unrespected" as "unregarded." Line 4 has received a number of broadly similar interpretations. Edward Dowden has "darkly bright" as "illumined, though closed"; he glosses the rest of the line "clearly directed in the darkness." Sidney Lee has the line "guided in the dark by the brightness of your shadow," while George Wyndham prefers "In the dark they heed that on which they are fixed."

In line 11, Edward Capell's emendation of the quarto's "their" to "thy" is now almost universally accepted.

== Musical settings ==
The sonnet was set to music by Benjamin Britten as the last song of his eight-song cycle Nocturne Op. 60 (1958) for tenor, 7 obbligato instruments (flute, clarinet, cor anglais, bassoon, French horn, timpani, harp) and strings. It was set to music by Aribert Reimann as the second of «Drei Sonette" (1964).

In 1990 Dutch composer Jurriaan Andriessen set the poem to a mixed chamber choir setting.

Rufus Wainwright's "Sonnet 43", the sixth track on his album All Days Are Nights: Songs for Lulu (2010), is a musical setting of the sonnet.

In 2004 Flemish composer Ludo Claesen set this poem to a setting for chamber music (flute, piano and soprano-solo).

A 2007 production by The Public Theater of King Lear in Central Park featured incidental music by Stephen Sondheim and Michael Starobin. It included a setting of Sonnet 43 by Sondheim.

In 2013 Laura Hawley composed a setting of Sonnet 43 for choir.

In 2021 the Korean-pop group Enhypen used lines from Sonnet 43 in the song "Outro: The Wormhole" from their second extended play (EP) Border: Carnival.

In 2013 the Korean-pop group Gfriend used lines from Sonnet 43 in the opening sequence of the music video of Sunny Summer.
