= Sonnet 15 =

« » Sonnet 15
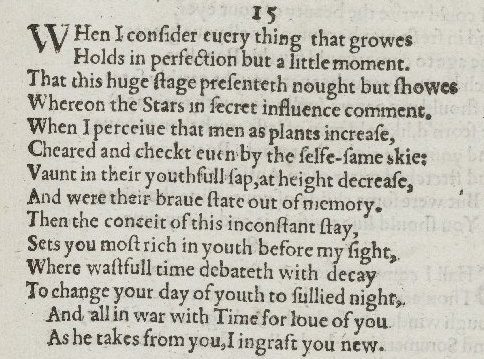
- Sonnet 15 in the 1609 Quarto
Q1
Q2
Q3
C
When I consider every thing that grows
Holds in perfection but a little moment,
That this huge stage presenteth nought but shows
Whereon the stars in secret influence comment;
When I perceive that men as plants increase,
Cheer’d and check’d even by the self-same sky,
Vaunt in their youthful sap, at height decrease,
And wear their brave state out of memory;
Then the conceit of this inconstant stay
Sets you most rich in youth before my sight,
Where wasteful Time debateth with Decay,
To change your day of youth to sullied night;
And all in war with Time for love of you,
As he takes from you, I engraft you new.
—William Shakespeare
4
8
12
14

Sonnet 15 is one of 154 sonnets written by the English playwright and poet William Shakespeare. It forms a diptych with Sonnet 16, as Sonnet 16 starts with "But...", and is thus fully part of the procreation sonnets, even though it does not contain an encouragement to procreate. The sonnet is within the Fair Youth sequence.

== Summary ==
Also known as "When I consider every thing that grows," Sonnet 15 is one of English playwright and poet William Shakespeare's 154 sonnets. It is a contained within the Fair Youth sequence, considered traditionally to be from sonnet 1-126 "which recount[s] the speaker's idealized, sometimes painful love for a femininely beautiful, well-born male youth". In another subcategory the sonnet is also contained within what is known as the Procreation sonnets.

According to Vendler, the sonnet is the first to employ Shakespeare's grand microcosmic scale, more suited to philosophy than a sonnet about love. Shakespeare begins the poem with the speaker "look[ing] on life from the vantage point of the stars above in his consideration; yet he sees as well from a helpless human perspective below." The poem then introduces a "retrospective reading of ingraft" that denotes immortalizing the Fair Youth that continues in Sonnet 16.

== Context ==
Sonnet 15 is part of the Fair Youth sequence, or sonnets 1–126, as established by the 1609 Quarto, which was "divided into two parts, the first concerning a beautiful male youth and the second a woman." This sequence emphasizes "longing, jealousy, and a fear of separation, while anticipating both the desire and the anguish of the subsequent poems."

Professor Michael Schoenfeldt of the University of Michigan characterizes the Fair Youth sequence sonnets as "the articulation of a fervent same-sex love," but the character of this love remains unclear. Some commentators, noting the romantic language used in the Fair Youth sequence, call these poems a "daring representation of homoerotic...passions," of "passionate, erotic love," suggesting that the relationship between the addressee and the Fair Youth is sexual. Others suggest the relationship is one of purely platonic love.

At the beginning of the Fair Youth sequence are the procreation sonnets, sonnets 1-17. It is an "entire sonnet sequence...marked not only by a preoccupation with the category of memory, but also by a fascination with the sheer capaciousness and complexity of that category." Sonnet 15 is located at the latter end of this section. Sonnet 15 introduces the idea of the speaker "immortaliz[ing] his beloved in verse" (rather than by physical procreation, as in previous sonnets), a theme that continues in sonnets 16 and 17.

== Structure ==
Sonnet 15 is typical of an English (or "Shakespearean") sonnet. Shakespeare's sonnets "almost always consist of fourteen rhyming iambic-pentameter lines", arranged in three quatrains followed by a couplet, with the rhyme scheme abab cdcd efef gg. Sonnet 15 also contains a volta, or shift in the poem's subject matter, beginning with the third quatrain.

The first line of the couplet exemplifies a regular iambic pentameter:

×   /   ×   /   ×    /    ×   /   ×   / 
And all in war with Time for love of you, (15.13)

/ = ictus, a metrically strong syllabic position. × = nonictus.

The meter of line four has generated some controversy. Stephen Booth has asserted that it "asks to be pronounced as a twelve-syllable, six-stress line", and Kenneth Larsen seems to concur, noting ambivalently that "[t]he line of 12 syllables (like the 12 astrological signs) is either deliberate or an unusual mistake."

Peter Groves has strongly criticized this view, writing: "Booth ... asserts that comment ... (rhyming with moment) should be stressed commént (unattested elsewhere in Shakespeare), turning a pentameter into the only alexandrine in the Sonnets, merely because he thinks that the line 'sounds good when pronounced that way'. John Kerrigan states flatly "[t]he line is not Alexandrine; influence has two syllables; and comment is accented on the first syllable, producing a feminine ending." A resulting scansion is:

  /  ×    ×   /   ×   /  ×  /    ×     / (×)
Whereon the stars in secret influence comment; (15.4)

(×) = extrametrical syllable.

== Exegesis ==
Sonnet 15 serves as part of the transition between the earlier Procreation Sonnets, in which the speaker urges the addressee to have children and thus "copy" himself to achieve immortality, and later sonnets in which the speaker emphasizes the power of his own 'eternal lines" (18.12) to immortalize the addressee. Stephen Booth, professor emeritus at the University of California Berkeley, notes that the "dividing line between the procreation sonnets and sonnets 18-126" has a curious "imperceptibility," but he goes on to assert that Sonnet 15's closing line "As he [i.e. Time] takes from you, I engraft you new" (15.14) is the "first of several traditional claims for the immortalizing power of verse." This theme of poetic immortality is continued in later sonnets, including sonnet 17's closing couplet "You should live twice: in [your child] and in my rhyme," in sonnet 18's last few lines "Nor shall death brag thou wander'st in his shade / When in eternal lines to time thou grow'st. / So long as men can breathe or eyes can see, / So long lives this, and this gives life to thee," and sonnet 19's final line "My love shall in my verse live ever young."

Josephy Pequigney, Professor Emeritus of English at the State University of New York at Stony Brook and author of Such Is My Love: A Study of Shakespeare's Sonnets, argues that this new method of immortality provides the speaker with "an alternative means of salvaging the beloved, a means solely at his command and independent of the biological means that would require the youth to beget children on one of those eager maidens." He adds that this may indicate "an intensification of the protagonist's love and, as it is born of and nourished by beauty, its amorous character."

Sonnet 15 also establishes the idea of a "war with time for love of you" (15.13), which is continued in earnest in sonnet 19 when the speaker "challenges...the universal devourer," i.e. Time, "in an effort to keep his friend," i.e. the addressee, "intact."

According to Crosman, "W. H Auden , in his preface cites sonnet 15 as proof that the sonnets are not in chronological order." However, he goes on to state that "Sonnet 12 through 15 stages little dramas in which the poet worries about the impact on himself of the young man's dying without making a copy of himself; the last of these 15 develops a strategy for dealing with this worry—the poet will make copies of his beloved in verse." This idea is further propelled by Schoenfeldt who claims that "The poet pledges to "engraft [the young man] new" (ll. 13–14) in his verse. While brave states are commonly worn "out of memory", the poet "war[s] with time" in order to perpetuate the memory of the young man (ll. 8, 13). In other words the poet emerges and an alternative memory technology to that of reproduction. Still, the speaker acknowledges that even this new solution is imperfect: Alison V. Scott explains that the "poet-speaker repeatedly addresses the problem that art cannot render a perfect 'copy' of the young man, and this observation impinges upon his promise to immortalize his beloved in verse."

== Interpretations ==
- Marianne Jean-Baptiste, for the 2002 compilation album, When Love Speaks (EMI Classics)
