= Stockyard (magazine) =

- The masthead of Stockyard magazine
- Executive Editors: Mikayla Lynch, Jacob Malone, Rory Tolan
- Categories: Culture, literature, arts, politics
- Frequency: online weekly
- Publisher: Stockyard Media, Inc.
- Founded: 2008
- First issue: January 2008
- Final issue: September 2010
- Country: United States
- Based in: Chicago
- Language: English
- Website: www.stockyardmagazine.com

Stockyard was an American online cultural magazine that focused on society, art, and literature; it published fiction, poetry, social commentary, political commentary, satire, reportage, and reviews. Started in 2008, it matured into a publication relevant to its Chicagoan and international audience. It folded in September 2010.

== History ==
Stockyard Media, Inc. – the company that owned and published Stockyard – was founded in 2008 by four alumni of the University of Chicago; originally slated to be a print magazine, the magazine moved to Internet-only, citing "the flexibility and ingenuity that the Internet allows."

Stockyard published Guggenheim fellows, and authors from New York, Washington, D.C., London, and Edinburgh, despite its basis in the city of Chicago. The magazine was a sponsor of the Chicago Literary Hall of Fame.

== Critical response ==
Stockyard received praise for its notable section, the Galerie, for its well-curated art from Chicago artists, and for the strong voices of its writers. Fiction author Doug Shiloh praised the magazine, writing, "Speed is a plus to these times. Stockyard employed the true worth of the Internet; it was published within a week of first notifying me. Editor Rory Tolan and crew are creating something special in Chicago with the scope of what they're giving to audience."

In a review published in the Chicago Weekly, some the magazine's articles were cited as being written in an inaccessible style, but many readers commenting on articles have disagreement with the assessment.
