= Bratsch (band) =

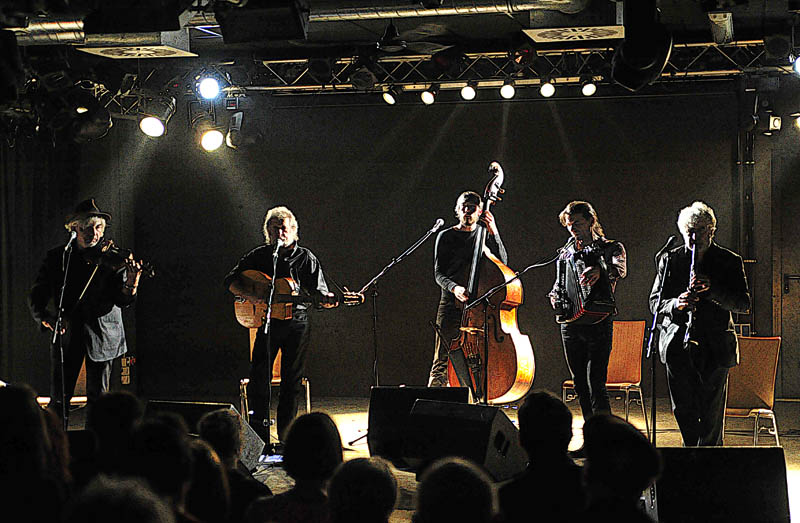
Bratsch in 2011

Bratsch were a French-based music ensemble using influences from Roma (i.e. "Gypsy") music, klezmer, jazz and many diverse folk traditions.

== History ==
The group was formed in 1972 by guitarist Dan Gharibian and violinist Bruno Girard, and released its first album in 1976. They have released more than ten albums to date. The group was renowned for the diversity of its musical influences and for the virtuosity of its members and guest artists. After more than 40 years of success, the group ended their career by giving a final concert on December 31, 2015.

== Members ==
- Dan Gharibian: guitar, bouzouki, vocals
- Bruno Girard: violin, vocals
- Théo Girard: double bass
- Nano Peylet: clarinet
- François Castiello: accordion, vocals

== Discography ==
=== Albums ===
- 1976: Musiques de partout
- 1978: J'aime un voyou, maman
- 1981: Live à la Potinière
- 1989: Notes de voyage
- 1990: Sans domicile fixe
- 1992: Transports en commun
- 1993: Gipsy Music From the Heart of Europe
- 1994: Correspondances
- 1994: Le Mangeur de lune (soundtrack of film Dai Sijie)
- 1996: Ecoute ça chérie
- 1997: Terre Promise
- 1998: Rien dans les poches
- 1999: On a rendez-vous (Live)
- 2001: La vie, la mort, tout ça...
- 2003: Nomades en vol (Best of)
- 2005: Ca s'fête (Best of Live for 25th anniversary)
- 2007: Plein du monde
- 2011: Urban Bratsch
- 2013: Brut de Bratsch 1973→2013 (compilation, 3xCD+DVD)
