= Procreation sonnets =

Sequence of sonnets by William Shakespeare

The procreation sonnets are Shakespeare's sonnets numbers 1 through 17.

Although Sonnet 15 does not directly refer to procreation, the single-minded urgings in the previous sonnets, may suggest to the reader that procreation is intended in the last line: "I engraft you new". Sonnet 16 continues the thought and makes clear that engrafting refers to recreating the young man in "barren rhyme". Sonnet 16 goes on to urge the youth to marry and have children.

They are referred to as the procreation sonnets because they encourage the young man they address to marry and father children. In these sonnets, Shakespeare's speaker several times suggests that the child will be a copy of the young man, who will therefore live on through his child.

The actual historical identity, if any, of the young man is a mystery; two candidates that have received the most consideration are Henry Wriothesley, 3rd Earl of Southampton; and William Herbert, 3rd Earl of Pembroke.

Sonnet 18 ("Shall I compare thee to a summer's day?") turns away from the theme of procreation and introduces a new and greater perspective, in which the speaker of the sonnets begins to express his own devotion to the young man.

== Sources ==
- Booth, Stephen, ed. (1977). Shakespeare's Sonnets. Yale University. ISBN 0300024959.
- Duncan-Jones, Katherine, ed. (2010). Shakespeare's Sonnets. The Arden Shakespeare, third series (Revised ed.). Bloomsbury Publishing. ISBN 978-1408017975.
- Green, Martin (1974). The Labyrinth of Shakespeare's Sonnets: An Examination of Sexual Elements in Shakespeare's Language. Skilton.
