= Fluke discography =

- Studio albums: 6
- Live albums: 1
- Compilation albums: 3
- Singles: 25

The discography of English electronic music group Fluke consists of six studio albums, one live album, three compilation albums, a white label promo album, twenty-five singles; of which eighteen were released on label and seven are white label and/or promotional only singles.

The discography also lists remixes that the group as produced for other artists and music released by the group under the alias The Lucky Monkeys. Releases by other groups that also involve Fluke (2 Bit Pie, Beauty School and Syntax) are listed on their individual pages.

== Albums ==
The following is a list of all albums by Fluke, sorted into albums released on label, live albums and white label/promotional albums. The right-hand column of this section lists all of the albums chronologically.

=== Studio albums released on label ===
- The Techno Rose of Blighty (1991, Creation Records)
- Six Wheels on My Wagon (1993, Circa) – UK #41
- Oto (1995, Circa) – UK #44
- Risotto (1997, Circa/Virgin/Astralwerks) – UK #45
- Puppy (2003, One Little Indian)
- The Second Bite (2026, Surface Records)

=== Live albums ===
- Out (In Essence) (1991, Circa/Virgin)

=== Compilation albums ===
- The Peel Sessions (1994, Strange Fruit)
- Progressive History X (2001, Circa)
- Progressive History XXX (2002, Circa)

=== White label/Promotional only albums ===
- Xmas Demos (2000, Virgin)

=== Albums listed chronologically ===
- The Techno Rose of Blighty (1991, Creation Records)
- Out (In Essence) (1991, Circa/Virgin)
- Six Wheels on My Wagon (1993, Circa)
- The Peel Sessions (1994, Strange Fruit)
- Oto (1995, Circa)
- Risotto (1997, Circa/Virgin/Astralwerks)
- Xmas Demos (2000, Virgin)
- Progressive History X (2001, Circa)
- Progressive History XXX (2002, Circa)
- Puppy (2003, One Little Indian)
- The Second Bite (2026, Surface Records)

== Singles ==
The following is a list of all singles by Fluke, sorted into singles released on label and White Label/Promotional singles. There are some overlaps between the two categories where singles were released only promotionally but not on white label. The right-hand column of this section lists all of the singles chronologically.

=== Singles released on label ===
- "Thumper!" (1989)
- "Joni/Taxi" (1990)
- "Philly" (1990) UK #120
- "The Bells" (1991)
- "Slid" (1993) – UK #59
- "Electric Guitar" (1993) – UK #58
- "Groovy Feeling" (1993) – UK #45
- "Bubble" (1994) – UK #37
- "Bullet" (1995) – UK #23
- "Tosh" (1995) – UK #32
- "Atom Bomb" (1996) – UK #20
- "Absurd" (1997) – UK #25
- "Squirt" (1997) – UK #46
- "Absurd: The Remixes" (2001)
- "Slap It" (2001) – UK #119
- "Pulse" (2002) – UK #127
- "Hang Tough" (2003) – UK #149
- "Switch" (2003) – UK #192

=== White label/Promotional only singles ===
- "Island Life" (1988)
- "The Bells" (1991)
- "Absurd: The Remixes" (2001)
- "Slap It" (2001)
- "Slid/Timeless Land (Wrecked Angle Mixes)" (2003)
- "Slid (King of Cool Remixes)" (2004)
- "Bullet 2005" (2005)

=== Singles listed chronologically ===
- "Island Life" (1988)
- "Thumper!" (1989)
- "Joni/Taxi" (1990)
- "Philly" (1990)
- "The Bells" (1991)
- "Slid" (1993)
- "Electric Guitar" (1993)
- "Groovy Feeling" (1993)
- "Bubble" (1994)
- "Bullet" (1995)
- "Tosh" (1995)
- "Atom Bomb" (1996)
- "Absurd" (1997)
- "Squirt" (1997)
- "Absurd: The Remixes" (2001)
- "Slap It" (2001)
- "Pulse" (2002)
- "Hang Tough" (2003)
- "Slid/Timeless Land (Wrecked Angle Mixes)" (2003)
- "Switch" (2003)
- "Slid (King of Cool Remixes)" (2004)
- "Bullet 2005" (2005)
- "Insanely Beautiful" (2024)
- "Real Magnificent" (2024)
- "I Wanna Be" (2025)

== Remixes ==
This is a list of remixes that Fluke have produced for other artists.

Artist	Title	Remix title	Length	Format
2 Bit Pie	"Here I Come"	Fluke Remix	7:11	CDR
Atlas	"Compass Error"	Fluke Remix	8:00	12" Vinyl
Banco de Gaia	"Obsidian"	Fluke Mix	8:56	12" Vinyl/CD
Björk	"Big Time Sensuality"	Fluke's Magimix	5:51	12" Vinyl/CD
Björk	"Big Time Sensuality"	Fluke's Minimix	4:05	12" Vinyl/CD
Björk	"Big Time Sensuality"	Fluke's Moulimix	5:43	12" Vinyl/CD
Björk	"Violently Happy"	Fluke Even Tempered	4:33	12" Vinyl/CD/Cassette
Björk	"Violently Happy"	Fluke Well Tempered	5:54	12" Vinyl/CD
Björk	"Hyperballad"	Fluke Mix	6:39	CD
EBH	"Chocolate Coated Money"	Fluke Mix 1	6:06	CD
EBH	"Chocolate Coated Money"	Fluke Mix 2	6:12	12" Vinyl
Frankie Goes to Hollywood	"Two Tribes"	Fluke's Magimix	5:27	12" Vinyl/CD
Frankie Goes to Hollywood	"Two Tribes"	Fluke's Magimix Instrumental	5:27	12" Vinyl
Frankie Goes to Hollywood	"Two Tribes"	Fluke's Minimix	3:50	12" Vinyl/CD/Cassette
Frankie Goes to Hollywood	"Two Tribes"	Fluke's Moulimix	7:02	12" Vinyl/CD
Horse McDonald	"Celebrate"	Magimix	6:10	12" Vinyl/CD
Horse McDonald	"Celebrate"	Moulimix	6:29	12" Vinyl/CD
The Human League	"Love Action"	Fluke's Dub Action Remix	7:13	CD
Tomoyasu Hotei	"Believe Me, I'm a Liar"	Fluke Dub Mix	5:18	CD
Tomoyasu Hotei	"Believe Me, I'm a Liar"	Fluke Remix	5:34	CD
The Impossibles	"Delphis"	Remixed by Fluke	5:55	12" Vinyl/CD
JC-001	"Never Again"	Moulimix	6:17	12" Vinyl/CD
Juno Reactor	"Pistolero"	Fluke "Hang'Em High" Remix	5:18	12" Vinyl/CD
Khaled	"Kebou"	Fluke Mix	6:41	12" Vinyl/CD
Khaled	"Kebou"	Fluke 132 BPM Mix	7:49	12" Vinyl
Little Axe	"Ride On (Fight On)"	Fluke Mid-Fi Surprise	7:10	12" Vinyl/CD
Little Axe	"Ride On (Fight On)"	Fluke Lo-Fi Surprise	6:13	12" Vinyl
Little Axe	"Ride On (Fight On)"	Fluke Mid-Fi Instrumental	7:10	12" Vinyl
The Lucky Monkeys	"Bjango"	Fluke Remix Six to the Floor	5:56	12" Vinyl/CD
Mellow	"Paris Sous La Neige"	Dr Syntax Vox Remix	6:33	12" Vinyl/CD
Mellow	"Paris Sous La Neige"	Dr Syntax Instrumental Remix	6:33	12" Vinyl/CD
Robert Miles	"Full Moon"	Fluke Vocal Eclipse	6:43	12" Vinyl/CD
Robert Miles	"Full Moon"	Fluke Instrumental Eclipse	5:13	12" Vinyl/CD
New Order	"Spooky"	Magimix	6:57	12" Vinyl/CD
New Order	"Spooky"	Minimix	3:51	12" Vinyl/CD
New Order	"Spooky"	Moulimix	5:49	12" Vinyl/CD
Opik	"Eastern"	Fluke Remix	5:45	12" Vinyl
Pop Will Eat Itself	"RSVP"	Fluke Breakfast Mix	6:24	CD
Pop Will Eat Itself	"RSVP"	Fluke Lunch/Dinner Mix	6:24	CD
Pop Will Eat Itself	"RSVP"	Fluke Supper Mix	5:28	CD
Rairbirds	"Need More Now"	Fluke Remix	7:07	12" Vinyl/CD
The Rolling Stones	"Out of Control"	In Hand With Fluke Edit	4:32	CD
The Rolling Stones	"Out of Control"	In Hand With Fluke	8:27	12" Vinyl/CD
The Rolling Stones	"Out of Control"	In Hand With Fluke Instrumental	5:58	12" Vinyl/CD
Sensation	"Beautiful Morning"	Fluke's Magimix	6:25	CD
Sensation	"Beautiful Morning"	Fluke's Multi Practice Mix	6:24	CD
Simple Minds	"Theme for Great Cities '98"	Fluke's Atlantis Mix	5:37	CD
Smashing Pumpkins	"The End Is the Beginning Is the End"	Stuck in the Middle With Fluke - Alternate Mix	5:39	12" Vinyl/CD
Smashing Pumpkins	"The End Is the Beginning Is the End"	Stuck in the Middle With Fluke - Instrumental Mix	6:45	12" Vinyl/CD
Smashing Pumpkins	"The End Is the Beginning Is the End"	Stuck in the Middle With Fluke - Vocal Mix	6:44	12" Vinyl/CD
Soft Ballet	"Spindle"	Fluke Remix	6:11	CD
Talk Talk	"Life's What You Make It"	Remixed by Fluke	6:15	12" Vinyl/CD
Tears for Fears	"Johnny Panic and the Bible of Dreams"	Mix 1	6:23	12" Vinyl/CD
Tears for Fears	"Johnny Panic and the Bible of Dreams"	Mix 2	5:58	12" Vinyl/CD
World of Twist	"She's a Rainbow"	Radio Edit	3:39	CD
World of Twist	"She's a Rainbow"	Right Foot Yellow Mix	5:24	12" Vinyl/CD
World of Twist	"She's a Rainbow"	Left Hand Blue Mix	5:54	12" Vinyl
Yello	"How How"	Brown Cow Mix	5:29	12" Vinyl/CD
Yello	"How How"	Dee Doo Dee Mix	5:52	12" Vinyl/CD
Yello	"How How"	Dee Doo Dee Dub mix	5:55	12" Vinyl/CD
Yello	"How How"	Fluke Radio Edit	3:21	CD
Yello	"How How"	Papa-Who-Ma-Mix	5:41	12" Vinyl/CD

== Aliases and related artists ==
Discographies of bands who; contain all members of Fluke, contain any of the members of Fluke or are Fluke under a different name.

=== The Lucky Monkeys ===
Singles

- "All Aboard" (1990, Self-Released/Lafayette)
- "Bjango" (1996, Polydor/Hi Life Recordings)
