= Sliver (soundtrack) =

Sliver: Music from the Motion Picture

Soundtrack album by various artists
- Released: June 1, 1993
- Genres: Trip hop; industrial
- Length: 55:15
- Label: Virgin Movie Music
- Producers: various; for album: Tim Sexton (executive album producer)

Singles from Sliver: Music from the Motion Picture
- 1. "Can't Help Falling in Love" Released: May 10, 1993; 2. "Carly's Song" Released: 1 November 1993

Sliver: Music from the Motion Picture is a soundtrack album for the 1993 film Sliver. It peaked at number 23 on the Billboard 200 chart and was certified gold by the RIAA on December 17, 1993.

Professional ratings
Review scores
Source	Rating
AllMusic	3/5 stars
Music Week	3/5 stars
Philadelphia Inquirer	2/4 stars

== Track listing ==
No.	Title	Writer(s)	Producer(s)	Length
1.	"Can't Help Falling in Love" (performed by UB40)	George David Weiss; Hugo Peretti; Luigi Creatore	UB40	3:26
2.	"Carly's Song" (performed by Enigma)	Michael Cretu	Michael Cretu	3:49
3.	"Slid" (performed by Fluke)	Michael Bryant; Michael Tournier; Jonathan Fugler	Fluke	3:46
4.	"Unfinished Sympathy" (performed by Massive Attack)	Grantley Marshall; Robert Del Naja; Andrew Vowles; J. Sharp; Shara Nelson	Massive Attack with Jonny Dollar	5:09
5.	"The Most Wonderful Girl" (performed by Lords of Acid)	Oliver Adams; Nikki Van Lierop; Maurice Engelen	Jade 4 U; Oliver Adams; Praga Khan	4:47
6.	"Oh Carolina" (performed by Shaggy)	John Folkes (uncr.)	Sting International	3:06
7.	"Move with Me" (performed by Neneh Cherry)	Neneh Cherry; Cameron McVey	Booga Bear; Jonny Dollar; Neneh Cherry	5:21
8.	"Slave to the Vibe" (performed by Aftershock)	V. Jeffrey Smith; Peter Lord; Guy Routte	V. Jeffrey Smith; Peter Lord	5:45
9.	"Penthouse and Pavement" (performed by Heaven 17)	Ian Craig Marsh; Martyn Ware; Glenn Gregory	British Electric Foundation	3:58
10.	"Skinflowers" (performed by The Young Gods)	music: The Young Gods; Roli Mosimann; lyrics: Franz	Roli Mosimann	5:08
11.	"Star Sail" (performed by Verve)	Simon Jones; Peter Salisbury; Nick McCabe; Richard Ashcroft	John Leckie	3:58
12.	"Wild at Heart" (performed by BIGOD 20)	Marcus Nikolai; Zip Campisi	BIGOD 20; Nino Tielmann	4:15
13.	"Carly's Loneliness" (performed by Enigma)	Michael Cretu	Michael Cretu	3:11

=== Notes ===
- "Oh Carolina" contains the "Peter Gunn Theme" written by Henry Mancini.

== Chart history ==
Chart (1993)	Peak position
Canada Top Albums/CDs (RPM)	5
US Billboard 200	23
