= Jon Fugler =

- Born: Jonathan Fugler; 13 October 1962 (age 63); St Austell, Cornwall, England
- Origin: Beaconsfield, Buckinghamshire, England
- Genres: Electronic, house, breakbeat, IDM, trip hop
- Instrument: Vocals
- Years active: 1988–present
- Labels: Creation, Strange Fruit, Virgin, Astralwerks, Appalooso, One Little Indian
- Member of: Fluke

Jonathan Fugler (born 13 October 1962) is an English electronic musician, songwriter, and producer best known as a founding member and vocalist of the group Fluke. His work has been influential in the development of British electronic music throughout the 1990s and 2000s.

== Early life ==
Fugler was born in St Austell, Cornwall, and later moved to Buckinghamshire. He attended Sir William Borlase's Grammar School in Marlow, where he met future bandmate Mike Bryant.

Before Fluke, Fugler and Bryant played in several local bands, including a group called *Skin*, experimenting with rock instrumentation before gravitating toward the emerging electronic and acid house scenes of the late 1980s.

== Career ==
=== Formation of Fluke ===
In 1988, Fugler co-founded Fluke with Mike Bryant and Mike Tournier.

The trio's early material fused acid house and techno influences with pop structures and ambient elements. Fugler provided vocals, lyrics, and conceptual direction, describing his contribution as giving the group "a conceptual overview of the music."

=== Mainstream recognition ===
Fluke released their debut album The Techno Rose of Blighty in 1991, followed by Six Wheels on My Wagon (1993), Oto (1995), Risotto (1997) and Puppy (2003). Their 1996 single "Atom Bomb" became one of the most recognisable electronic tracks of the 1990s and was featured on multiple film and video game soundtracks. Fugler's distinct vocal delivery and lyrical phrasing became part of the group's sonic identity.

Throughout the 1990s, Fluke's music appeared on numerous compilations and live festival line-ups, positioning the group alongside contemporaries such as Underworld, Leftfield, and the Chemical Brothers.

=== Later projects ===
After Tournier left Fluke in the early 2000s, Fugler and Bryant continued to work under the name Fluke and later formed the side project 2 Bit Pie, releasing the album 2Pie Island in 2006.

In 2024, Fugler and Bryant released new Fluke material, including the single "Real Magnificent", receiving airplay on BBC 6 Music.

== Musical style and legacy ==
Fugler's work is characterised by a blend of electronic experimentation and melodic structure. His vocals often serve as rhythmic and textural elements rather than traditional lead lines, aligning with the group’s emphasis on atmosphere and production innovation.

Fluke's crossover into mainstream media—through film, television, and video game placements—helped bring underground electronic sounds to a wider audience, cementing Fugler's contribution to the genre's evolution.

== Discography ==
=== With Fluke ===
- The Techno Rose of Blighty (1991)
- Six Wheels on My Wagon (1993)
- Oto (1995)
- Risotto (1997)
- Puppy (2003)

=== With 2 Bit Pie ===
- 2Pie Island (2006)
