= YKK (disambiguation) =

YKK is a Japanese manufacturing group founded in 1934.

YKK may also refer to:

- Union of Communists of Kurdistan (Kurdish: Yekîtîya Komunîstên Kurdistan), Turkey (1986–1990s)
- Yokohama Kaidashi Kikou, a sci-fi manga series by Hitoshi Ashinano (1994–2006)
- Kitkatla Water Aerodrome, British Columbia, Canada (IATA:YKK)
- "YKK", a song by Fluke from the album Puppy
