= Pie Island (disambiguation) =

Pie Island is an island in Lake Superior, Ontario, Canada.

Pie Island may also refer to:

- Eel Pie Island, an island in the River Thames, London
- 2Pie Island, an album by the British electronica group 2 Bit Pie
