= Absurd =

Absurd or The Absurd may refer to:

== Entertainment ==
- Absurd (band), German metal band from the 1990s
- "Absurd", a 1997 song by Fluke, from the album Risotto
- "Absurd" (song), a 2021 song by Guns N' Roses
- Theatre of the Absurd, art form utilizing the philosophy of Absurdism
- Absurd (film), 1981 Italian film
- Absurd or surreal humour
  - Absurdist fiction

== Philosophy and logic ==
- Absurdity, general and technical usage—associated with extremely poor reasoning, the ridiculous, or nonsense
  - The Absurd, the conflict between the human tendency to seek a certain meaning of life and the failure to find any
    - Absurdism, a philosophy based on the belief that the universe is irrational and meaningless
  - Reductio ad absurdum, a type of logical argument
