= Switch (Fluke song) =

Single by Fluke

from the album Puppy
- Released: 28 July 2003
- Recorded: 2003
- Length: 4:33
- Label: One Little Indian
- Songwriters: Mike Bryant, Jon Fugler
- Producer: Fluke

Fluke singles chronology
"Hang Tough" (2003)	"Switch" (2003)	"Slid (King of Cool Remixes)" (2004)

"Switch" is a single by the English electronic music band Fluke. It is featured on their 2003 album Puppy. It is the band's last official single of the 2000s using the alias Fluke, although it has been followed by the white label vinyl release Bullet 2005, which does not appear to be an official "on-label" release by the band.

"Switch" is featured on the Need for Speed: Underground 2 soundtrack.

== Versions ==
Switch	382TR7CD
Format:	CD
Label:	One Little Indian
Released:	28 July 2003
Track listing:	1. Switch - 7" (4 minutes 33 seconds); 2. Switch - Twitch (11 minutes 16 seconds) (sample); 3. Switch - Marco Bellini & Val Weller Bosomania Club Mix (8 minutes 09 seconds); 4. Nebulus Vox (7 minutes 03 seconds)
Switch	382TP12
Format:	12" Vinyl
Label:	One Little Indian
Released:	28 July 2003
Track listing:	1. Switch - Twitch (11 minutes 16 seconds); 2. Switch - Marco Bellini Mix (8 minutes 09 seconds)
