= Electric guitar (disambiguation) =

Electric guitar may refer to:

- Electric guitar, a musical instrument
  - Electric twelve-string guitar
  - Electric acoustic guitar
  - Electric bass guitar
- "Electric Guitar" (song), a song by the English electronic music band Fluke
- "Electric Guitar", a song by Talking Heads from their album Fear of Music
- Electric Guitars, an English band
- "Electric Guitars", a song by Prefab Sprout from the album Andromeda Heights
