= Progressive History X =

Compilation album by Fluke
- Released: 23 July 2001
- Genre: Electronica
- Label: Circa
- Producer: Fluke

Fluke chronology
Risotto (1997)	Progressive History X (2001)	Progressive History XXX (2002)

Professional ratings
Review scores
Source	Rating
Allmusic	4.5/5 stars

Progressive History X is a compilation album by British electronica group Fluke, first released in July 2001. It is not to be confused with Progressive History XXX, their next compilation album. The cover artwork is from "Just your Average Second On This Planet" 1997-1998 (Discotheque) by David Bethell. Progressive History X spans their entire ten year producing history.

== Track listing ==
1. "Thumper!" (Original Mix) – 5:56
2. "Philly" (Jamorphous) – 7:12
3. "Slid" (Glid) – 6:57
4. "Electric Guitar" (Humbucker) – 7:32
5. "Groovy Feeling" (Make Mine A 99) – 7:51
6. "Bubble" (Speechbubble) – 6:41
7. "Bullet" (Bullion) – 7:46
8. "Tosh" (Gosh) – 6:31
9. "Atom Bomb" (Atomix 1) – 5:41
10. "Absurd" (Whitewash) – 5:59
11. "Squirt" (Risotto Vox) – 6:20
