= Super8 & Tab =

Finnish Trance DJ duo

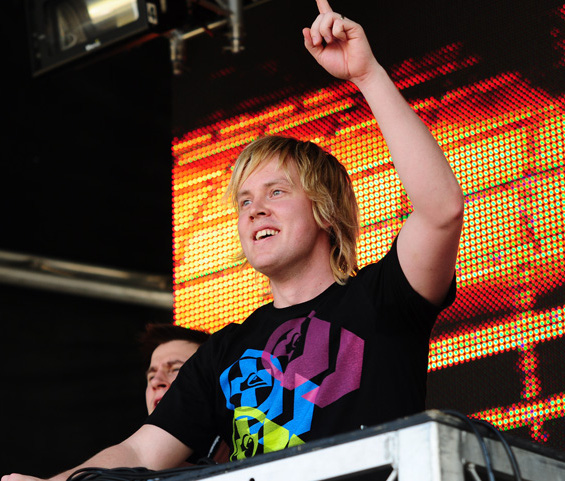
- Super8 & Tab at the Future Music Festival in Perth, Australia

Background information
- Also known as: Aalto
- Origin: Helsinki, Finland
- Genre: Trance
- Years active: 2005–present
- Labels: Anjunabeats, Armada Music
- Members: Miika Juhani Eloranta; Janne Mikael Mansnerus
- Website: www.super8andtab.com/

Super8 and Tab are a Finnish trance music duo of producers and DJs from Finland named Miika Eloranta (Super8) and Janne Mansnerus (DJ Tab). They recorded music as individual musicians until they officially decided to team up in 2005 after collaborating on their singles, "First Aid" and "Helsinki Scorchin'."

== Discography ==
=== Studio albums ===
- Empire (2010)
- Unified (2014)
- Reformation (2018)
- These Little Stories (Part 1) (2020)
- These Little Stories (Part 2) (2021)

=== Remix albums ===
- Empire Remixed (2011)

=== DJ mixes ===
- Anjunabeats Worldwide 01: Mixed by Super8 & Tab and Mark Pledger (2006)
- Anjunabeats Worldwide 02: Mixed by Super8 & Tab and Mat Zo (2010)

=== Radioshow ===
- SuperTab

=== Singles ===
- "First Aid" (2005)
- "Helsinki Scorchin'" (2006)
- "Wont Sleep Tonight" (2006)
- "Needs to Feel" (2007)
- "Suru" (2007)
- "Worldwide" (with Mark Pledger) (2007)
- "Elektra" (2008)
- "Delusion" (featuring Alyna) (2009)
- "Irufushi" (2009)
- "Black Is The New Yellow" (2010)
- "Mercy" (featuring Jan Burton) (2010)
- "Empire" (featuring Jan Burton) (2010)
- "My Enemy" (featuring Julie Thompson) (2010)
- "All We Have Is Now" (featuring Betsie Larkin) (2011)
- "Awakenings" (2012)
- "Black is Back" (featuring Jan Burton) (2012)
- "Fiesta" (2012)
- "Arc" (featuring Tritonal) (2012)
- "Teardrops" (2013)
- "L.A" (2013)
- "Your Secret’s Safe" (featuring Julie Thompson) (2013)
- "The Way You Want" (2013)
- "Code Red" (featuring Jaytech) (2014)
- "No Frontiers" (featuring Julie Thompson) (2014)
- "Let Go" (featuring Julie Thompson) (2014)
- "Rubicon" (featuring 7 Skies) (2015)
- "Patience" (featuring Julie Thompson) (2015)
- "Aika/Clairvoyance" (with BT) (2015)
- "Komorebi" (2015)
- "Moonbow" (2016)
- "Mega" (2016)
- "Into" (2016)
- "Nino" (2016)
- "Cosmo" (2017)
- "Falling into You (featuring Jonny Rose)" (2017)
- "Quest" (2017)
- "Pressure" (2017)
- "True Love" (featuring Envy Monroe)" (2018)
- "Blockchain" (2018)
- "Burn" (featuring Hero Baldwin)" (2018)
- "Lungs" (featuring Izzy Warner) (2019)
- "Trigger" (2019)
- "Stardust" (with Khomha) (2019)
- "Thrive" (2019)
- "Iron" (2019)
- "Rooftops" (with Christina Novelli) (2020)
- "Leka" (with Armin van Buuren) (2020)
- "Open My Eyes" (with Fatum) (2020)
- "Calm The Storm" (featuring Roxanne Emery) (2020)
- "Cova" (2020)
- "Hurricane Love" (featuring Colin Smith) (2020)
- "September" (with Tom Fall) (2021)
- "Asylum" (with ANG) (2021)
- "From Way Back" (vs. Factor B) (2021)

=== Remixes ===
- 2007 Above & Beyond presents Tranquility Base – "Oceanic"
- 2008 Martin Roth and Alex Bartlett – "Off the World"
- 2008 Luminary – "Amsterdam"
- 2008 Paul van Dyk – "New York City"
- 2008 Bart Claessen and Dave Schiemann – "Madness"
- 2009 Ferry Corsten – "Made of Love"
- 2009 Paul van Dyk – "Nothing But You"
- 2010 Markus Schulz featuring Suissa – "Perception"
- 2011 Above and Beyond featuring Ashley Tomberlin – "Can't Sleep"
- 2011 Gareth Emery – "Citadel"
- 2011 Creep (featuring Romy) – "Days"
- 2011 Kyau & Albert – "Velvet Morning"
- 2012 Tritonal featuring Cristina Soto – "Piercing Quiet"
- 2012 Armin van Buuren featuring Ana Criado – "I'll Listen"
- 2013 BT featuring Aqualung – "Surrounded"
- 2015 Cosmic Gate featuring JES – "Yai (Here We Go Again)"
- 2016 Above & Beyond featuring Justine Suissa – "Little Something"
- 2016 Gareth Emery featuring Janet Devlin – "Lost"
- 2016 Tritonal and Jenaux featuring Adam Lambert – "Broken"
- 2018 Andrew Rayel featuring Eric Lumiere – "I'll Be There"
- 2018 Armin van Buuren featuring James Newman – "Therapy"
- 2019 Super8 & Tab – "Helsinki Scorchin" (Super8 & Tab 2019 Remix)
- 2019 Darude featuring Sebastian Rejman – "Look Away"
- 2022 Benjamin Duchenne - "I Don't Mind"
