= The Peel Sessions (Fluke album) =

Live album by Fluke
- Released: 1994
- Recorded: 1990/1991
- Genre: Electronic music
- Label: Astralwerks
- Producer: Fluke

Fluke chronology
| Six Wheels on My Wagon (1993) | The Peel Sessions (1994) | Oto (1995) |

The Peel Sessions is a live album by British electronica group Fluke, first released in 1994.

The album is a compilation of performances recorded live at the BBC for John Peel's radio show. It includes early versions of several tracks from Six Wheels on My Wagon and The Techno Rose of Blighty along with a previously unreleased track, "Time Keeper".

== Source recordings ==
This CD is a selection from two live sessions (18 November 1990 and 10 December 1991). All four tracks are present from the 1990 session, and just three of the four tracks from the 1991 session are present.

Fluke were invited to perform two further, unreleased, Peel Sessions after this CD. One broadcast on the 10 November 1996 (recording date unknown) and the other performed live on the 8 December 2002.

== Track listing ==
1. "Thumper!"
2. "Taxi"
3. "Jig"
4. "Our Definition of Jazz"
5. "The Bells"
6. "The Allotment of Blighty"
7. "Time Keeper"
