= Unified (Super8 & Tab album) =

Studio album by Super8 & Tab
- Released: October 27, 2014
- Genre: Trance
- Label: Anjunabeats

Super8 & Tab chronology
Empire (2010)	Unified (2014)	Reformation Part 1 (2018)

Singles from Unified
- 1. "Code Red" Released: 26 May 2014; 2. "No Frontiers" Released: 18 August 2014; 3. "Let Go" Released: 13 October 2014; 4. "Rubicon" Released: 12 January 2015; 5. "Patience" Released: 20 April 2015; 6. "Aika" Released: 17 July 2015; 7. "Clairvoyant" Released: 17 July 2015

Unified is the second studio album by Finnish trance duo Super8 & Tab, and was released on 27 October 2014 through label Anjunabeats.

== Track listing ==
Standard edition

No.	Title	Length
1.	"Memory Lane"	2:28
2.	"Let Go" (featuring Julie Thompson)	3:49
3.	"Code Red" (featuring Jaytech)	3:32
4.	"No Frontiers" (featuring Julie Thompson)	4:53
5.	"Who Needs Pain" (featuring Jan Burton)	4:33
6.	"Patience" (featuring Julie Thompson)	4:34
7.	"Aika" (featuring BT)	3:48
8.	"Clairvoyant"	4:10
9.	"Say U Luv" (featuring Alyna)	4:04
10.	"Antipodes" (featuring 7 Skies)	4:03
11.	"Sonata" (featuring Sunny Lax)	3:27
12.	"Rubicon" (featuring 7 Skies)	4:50
13.	"Souls of Lovers" (featuring Jan Burton)	4:40
14.	"Forever"	1:07

Extended mix edition

No.	Title	Length
1.	"Let Go" (featuring Julie Thompson)	6:22
2.	"Code Red" (featuring Jaytech)	5:38
3.	"No Frontiers" (featuring Julie Thompson)	7:29
4.	"Who Needs Pain" (featuring Jan Burton)	5:20
5.	"Patience" (featuring Julie Thompson)	6:11
6.	"Aika" (featuring BT)	6:13
7.	"Clairvoyant"	5:37
8.	"Say U Luv" (featuring Alyna)	4:04
9.	"Antipodes" (featuring 7 Skies)	5:08
10.	"Sonata" (featuring Sunny Lax)	6:05
11.	"Rubicon" (featuring 7 Skies)	7:22
12.	"Souls of Lovers" (featuring Jan Burton)	6:41
13.	"No Frontiers (Jerome Isma-Ae Remix)" (featuring Julie Thompson)	7:00
14.	"Let Go (Juventa Remix)" (featuring Julie Thompson)	5:16
15.	"Patience (Estiva Remix)" (featuring Julie Thompson)	5:53
16.	"Rubicon (Yotto Remix)" (featuring 7 Skies)	6:07
17.	"Code Red (Kago Pengchi Remix)" (featuring Jaytech)	6:04
