= Anjunabeats Worldwide 02 =

2010 compilation album by Super8 & Tab and Mat Zo

Compilation album by Super8 & Tab and Mat Zo
- Released: 10 May 2010
- Genre: Trance, progressive trance
- Label: Anjunabeats

Anjunabeats compilation chronology
Anjunadeep:02 (2010)	Anjunabeats Worldwide 02 (2010)	Anjunabeats Volume 8 (2010)

Anjunabeats Worldwide chronology
Anjunabeats Worldwide 01 (2006)	Anjunabeats Worldwide 02 (2010)

Anjunabeats Worldwide 02 is the second compilation album in the Anjunabeats Worldwide compilation series. It is mixed and compiled by Finnish trance duo Super8 & Tab and English trance producer Mat Zo, and was released 10 May 2010 on Anjunabeats. The compilation is named after the radio show of the same name, which airs every Sunday evening on the internet radio Digitally Imported.

== Track listing ==
Disc one: Mixed by Super8 & Tab
No.	Title	Artist	Length
1.	"Warp"	Roddy Reynaert	6:59
2.	"As You Fall" (Kyau & Albert Remix)	Bent	5:34
3.	"Safe (Wherever You Are)" (Rank 1 Remix)	Velvetine	4:34
4.	"Capture" (Mike Koglin Remix)	MaRLo feat. Em	5:31
5.	"Under Pressure"	Lange	5:40
6.	"Denva"	Ronski Speed	5:01
7.	"Black Is the New Yellow"	Super8 & Tab feat. Anton Sonin	5:57
8.	"Phoenix Burn"	Thomas Datt	5:58
9.	"Vanesse"	Sunny Lax	6:32
10.	"Irufushi" (Adam Nickey Remix)	Super8 & Tab	6:18
11.	"Ten Minutes to Midnight" (Original Club Mix)	Jer Martin	5:50
12.	"Caffeine"	7 Skies	6:32
13.	"Crafted"	Dan Stone	5:31
Total length:			1:16:03

Disc two: Mixed by Mat Zo
No.	Title	Artist	Length
1.	"Illumina"	Maor Levi	6:33
2.	"Aircraft"	Dinka	5:27
3.	"They Need Us" (Club Edit)	Arnej	4:10
4.	"Near the End"	Mat Zo	5:49
5.	"By All Means" (Club Mix)	Boom Jinx & Andrew Bayer	3:52
6.	"DejaVoodoo"	Andy Duguid	4:21
7.	"Perfect Dream"	San feat. Jan Johnston	5:38
8.	"Orient Sun"	Cold Blue	5:48
9.	"Xelerate"	Richard Durand	4:48
10.	"Elf"	Bart Claessen	7:09
11.	"Green Line" (Ronski Speed Remix)	Ankhen	5:58
12.	"The Lost"	Mat Zo	6:55
13.	"Everywhere You Are" (Duderstadt Dub Mix)	Mike Shiver & Aruna	5:20
14.	"Call of Loneliness" (Mat Zo Remix)	Reeves	7:25
Total length:			1:19:21
