= Atom Bomb (song) =

1996 song performed by Fluke

Single by Fluke

from the album Risotto / Wipeout 2097
- Released: 28 October 1996
- Label: Circa
- Songwriter(s): Mike Bryant, Jon Fugler, Mike Tournier
- Producer(s): Fluke

Fluke singles chronology
"Tosh" (1995)	"Atom Bomb" (1996)	"Absurd" (1997)

"Atom Bomb" is a single by the English electronic music band Fluke, released on 28 October 1996 by Circa and again in 1997 by Caroline Records. Originally created for the soundtrack to the video game Wipeout 2097 and later featured in Gran Turismo, the track reached number 20 in the UK music charts and brought Fluke their first non-club mainstream single. This song is also featured in part in other productions, including the films The Saint, Kiss the Girls, X-Men and Behind Enemy Lines, the theatrical trailers for Paparazzi and The Bourne Ultimatum, and the video game Enter the Matrix.

It was included on the album Risotto in 1997. The packaging and discs were designed by The Designers Republic in their usual futurist style, with the character designed and illustrated by David J. Aldred. All of Fluke's subsequent releases from this single were also designed by the firm, as were the first three games of the Wipeout series.

The part-animated music video was directed by Shaun Magher, who also directed and supervised the animation.

== Versions ==
Atom Bomb	YRCD125
Format:	CD
Label:	Circa
Released:	1996
Track listing:	1. Atom Bomb (Atomix 1) – 5:40 (sample); 2. Atom Bomb (Atomix 5) – 8:44; 3. Atom Bomb (Atomix 6) – 5:32; 4. Atom Bomb (Atomix 3 Edit) – 3:41
Atom Bomb	YRCDX125
Format:	CD
Label:	Circa
Released:	1996
Track listing:	1. Atom Bomb (Atomix 2) – 6:41; 2. Atom Bomb (Atomix 4) – 10:11; 3. Atom Bomb (Atomix 3) – 6:44; 4. Atom Bomb (Atomix 1 Edit) – 3:56
Atom Bomb	YRCDJ125
Format:	Promotional CD
Label:	Circa
Released:	1996
Track listing:	1. Atom Bomb (Atomix 3 Edit) – 3:41; 2. Atom Bomb (Atomix 1 Edit) – 3:56; 3. Atom Bomb (Atomix 5) – 8:44; 4. Atom Bomb (Atomix 2) – 6:41
Atom Bomb (From MTV's Amp)	CAR9076
Format:	Promotional CD
Label:	Caroline
Released:	1997
Track listing:	1. Atom Bomb (Atomix 1 Edit) (Album Version) – 3:56; 2. Atom Bomb (Atomix 3 Edit) (Atomix 3 Remix) – 3:41; 3. Atom Bomb (Atomix 6) (Atomix 6 Remix) – 5:32
Atom Bomb	YRT125
Format:	12" Vinyl
Label:	Circa
Released:	1996
Track listing:	1. Atom Bomb (Atomix 1) – 5:40; 2. Atom Bomb (Atomix 5) – 8:44; 3. Atom Bomb (Atomix 2) – 6:41; 4. Atom Bomb (Atomix 3) – 6:44
Atom Bomb	YRTDJ125
Format:	12" Promotional Vinyl
Label:	Circa
Released:	1996
Track listing:	1. Atom Bomb (Atomix 5) – 8:44; 2. Atom Bomb (Atomix 2) – 6:41
Atom Bomb	YRTXDJ125
Format:	12" Promotional Vinyl
Label:	Circa
Released:	1996
Track listing:	1. Atom Bomb (Atomix 4) – 10:11; 2. Atom Bomb (Atomix 1) – 5:40; 3. Atom Bomb (Atomix 6) – 5:32
