= 2 Bit Pie =

English electronic music group

- Origin: Beaconsfield, England; Nottingham, England
- Genres: Electronica, big beat, ambient house
- Years active: 2005–2008
- Label: One Little Indian
- Past members: Fluke; Mike Bryant; Marli Buck; Jan Burton; Jon Fugler; Robin Goodridge; Andy Gray; Wild Oscar; Dilshani Weerasinghe; Yuki

2 Bit Pie was an English electronic music group formed in 2005 as a collaboration between Fluke and other musicians, some of whom had previously worked with Fluke.

The band's debut album titled 2Pie Island was released on 4 September 2006. This was followed by a period of inactivity from the band's label, One Little Indian, before the singles "Nobody Never" and "Here I Come" were released in 2005.

== History and line-up ==
2 Bit Pie is the direct descendant of Fluke, the group including both of Fluke members, Mike Bryant and Jon Fugler. Both Bryant and Fugler have a writing credit each for every song on 2Pie Island with Andy Gray listed as an additional credit on "Fly" and "Nobody Never". Gray had previously worked with Korn and Paul Oakenfold. The group's vocals are provided by Jon Fugler, who was also the vocalist for Fluke, with additional vocals provided by Yukiko Ishii, formerly of Tokyo-based trip hop band She Shell, Dilshani Weerasinghe, of the Royal Opera, Louise Marshall, Margo Buchannon and Marli Buck.

== Discography ==
=== Albums ===
- 2Pie Island (2006)

=== Singles ===
- "Nobody Never" (2005)
- "Here I Come" (2006)
