= Risotto (album) =

Studio album by Fluke
- Released: 30 September 1997
- Recorded: 1996–1997
- Genre: Big beat; breakbeat; downtempo; progressive house
- Length: 73:22
- Label: Circa; Astralwerks
- Producer: Fluke

Fluke chronology
Oto (1995)	Risotto (1997)	Progressive History X (2001)

Risotto is the fourth studio album by British electronica group Fluke, released on 30 September 1997 on Circa Records, and on Astralwerks in the US. It was the band's last album recorded with Mike Tournier.

== Overview ==
The album is named after the dish risotto (Italian: [riˈzɔtto]). The album artwork was designed by The Designers Republic and features a chrome-plated KitchenAid mixer.

Many of the tracks that brought Fluke to a larger audience are featured on this album, including "Atom Bomb", used on the Wipeout 2097 soundtrack, and "Absurd," used in many films/trailers, including a 1998 Volkswagen Beetle commercial, Sin City in 2005, and the episode "Chaos" from the show Spaced. "Absurd" has also been a prominent theme for Sky Sports' Monday Night Football programme, initially from August 1997 to November 1998, and subsequently from August 2010 to present. Additionally, it continued to be featured in the programme analysis and break segments until May 1999.

Risotto reached number 45 in the UK Albums Chart, their last album chart placing to date.

When Fluke were touring for Risotto they were joined on stage by Rachel Stewart who acted as a personification of the band's official mascot, a character from the Wipeout series named Arial Tetsuo. Stewart continued as lead female vocalist and as a dancer for all of Fluke's live performances between 1997 and 1999.

After touring for a year with Risotto on the American "Electric Highway Tour", and having made two appearances at the Glastonbury festival in 1995 and 1998, Tournier decided to leave the group to pursue a different project named Syntax, with the band's long standing friend, Jan Burton. In 2002, The Fluke DJs were formed, a live-show pairing of Jon Fugler and Hugh Bryder. Bryder was a DJ who had assisted Fluke in their live performances since 1993 as well as working with other DJs such as Seb Fontaine while holding a DJ residency at MTV's special event parties. This seemed to indicate further rifts within the band as this DJ combination included neither Mike Bryant nor Tournier. However, Fugler denied these rumours shortly after they surfaced claiming that the band merely needed some time away from each other after their intense work on Risotto.

== Critical reception ==
Professional ratings
Review scores
Source	Rating
AllMusic	4.5/5 stars
Entertainment Weekly	B
The Guardian	3/5 stars
Muzik	8/10
NME	2/10
Pitchfork	9.0/10
The Sydney Morning Herald	4/5 stars
Uncut	3/5 stars

Risotto was perhaps the most favourably reviewed of all Fluke's albums with David Bennun of The Guardian writing:

Risotto pushes forward Fluke's slick, sophisticated techno at a relentless pace. Sometimes, on Absurd, Atom Bomb and especially the top-notch Squirt, it takes a terrier-like grip on your concentration, with the muted vocals hissing in your head like Martian broadcasts arriving through your fillings.

Writing for Melody Maker in October 1997, Neil Kulkarni gave Risotto a very positive review, singling out the album's lyrics as a highlight; "[Fluke] have the dumbest greatest deepest lyrics in dance – "Baby's got an atom-bomb/a motherfuckin' atom bomb" is the greatest heavy metal lyric never written; "Anybody with a heart votes love" is a chorus Stevie Wonder would be proud of; "Think big that's only half as large/Bigger, better, twice as hard" is Ooompah-Loompah haiku made pop poetry."

Ben Willmott, writing in the NME, described it as "indistinguishable from the previous three" Fluke albums, saying that "it never once sounds like a single ounce of sweat, blood or love has gone into its making."

== Track listing ==
No.	Title	Length
1.	"Absurd"	5:48
2.	"Atom Bomb"	5:45
3.	"Kitten Moon"	9:18
4.	"Mosh"	6:20
5.	"Bermuda"	7:57
6.	"Setback"	8:54
7.	"Amp"	8:09
8.	"Reeferendrum"	7:22
9.	"Squirt"	6:15
10.	"Goodnight Lover"	7:34
Total length:		73:22
