= Fluke (band) =

English electronic music group

- Also known as: The Lucky Monkeys
- Origin: Beaconsfield, Buckinghamshire, England
- Genres: Electronic; IDM; progressive house; techno; ambient; downtempo
- Years active: 1988–2003, 2009, 2024–present
- Labels: DJ Fluke Production Creation, Strange Fruit, Circa, Astralwerks, Appalooso, One Little Indian
- Members: Jon Fugler; Julian Nugent; Mike Tournier
- Past members: Mike Bryant
- Website: fluke.uk.com

Fluke are an English electronic music group formed in the late 1980s by Jon Fugler, Mike Tournier and Mike Bryant. The band are noted for their diverse range of electronic styles, including house, techno, ambient, big beat and downtempo. They received mainstream attention through their inclusion on various popular film and video game soundtracks, including Wipeout 2097 (1997), Lara Croft: Tomb Raider (2001), The Matrix Reloaded (2003), and Need for Speed: Underground (2003).

Fluke produced five original studio albums, three compilation albums, two live albums, and over a hundred remixes (of other artists and their own music) during their original run. Singer Rachel Stewart joined the band as vocalist and dancer for live performances between 1997 and 1999. Tournier left the group in 2000 to form the band Syntax with Jan Burton. Bryant and Fugler released Fluke's fifth studio album, Puppy in 2003, and 2Pie Island as 2 Bit Pie in 2006.

In 2024, Fluke returned from a lengthy hiatus with the single "Insanely Beautiful", with Fugler, Tournier, and band manager Jules Nugent joining as producer. The band's latest album, The Second Bite, was released in 2026.

== History ==
=== The Techno Rose of Blighty ===
Before forming Fluke, Fugler and Bryant had played in two punk bands together named The Leaky Radiators and The Layfigures. The third member of Fluke, Tournier, was introduced to the group when he undertook work on a collaboration with Fugler entitled "Skin". It soon became clear that all three shared musical tastes, having a shared interest in the acid house scene and the more experimental electronic sounds of Cabaret Voltaire and Giorgio Moroder.

Fluke's first single, released in 1988, was a white label vinyl entitled "Island Life", pressed on a clear blue 12" vinyl record. Although a commercial failure, as well as being very different in sound to the band's later works, the group persisted and released another two white label vinyls: "Thumper!" (sample) in 1989 and "Joni/Taxi" in 1990, a song that sampled Joni Mitchell's "Big Yellow Taxi". The attention that these records received gained the band a record deal with Creation Records with whom they released their first CD single "Philly" in the same year.

In the following year, Fluke released their first album, The Techno Rose of Blighty, swiftly followed by the single "The Bells" and a live album entitled Out (In Essence). For the release of Out (In Essence), Fluke abandoned their deal with Creation Records and signed instead with Circa Records, an offshoot of Virgin. The group also released the industrial music single "All Aboard" in 1990, under the name The Lucky Monkeys.

At this early stage in their career, the band realized that they would experience the greatest artistic freedom if they had their own recording studio and took it upon themselves to obtain their own premises. This was an asset which, according to Fugler, proved invaluable in coordinating the "wider pool of people — musicians and friends — that we draw on to help".

EMI asked Fluke to remix Talk Talk's 1986 song "Life's What You Make It" for the 1991 album History Revisited which largely consists of new remixes of Talk Talk songs. The album was removed from stores after the band denounced it, saying they had not given permission for the songs to be remixed.

=== Six Wheels on My Wagon ===
After a two-year break, Fluke returned with what became a breakthrough into mainstream popular music when, in 1993, they released the single "Slid". This became a club classic when it was picked up by DJ Sasha who liked it so much that he included three separate remixes of it on his Renaissance album. This burst of success was followed by two further singles, "Electric Guitar" (sample) and "Groovy Feeling", and, in the same year, the release of the group's second album, Six Wheels on My Wagon.

This new album was a distinctly house music production, with uplifting riffs and ambient effects, as opposed to the techno style of their previous release. The album was received favourably by critics, with Billboard magazine labelling it "groundbreaking". Other reviewers went further, with The Independent suggesting that Fluke was to become the next big thing in Europe:

Fluke's Six Wheels on My Wagon represents the current high-water mark of modern ambient-groove music, showing that although this mode has effectively become the future sound of Europe, it's rarely done as well on the continent as in Britain. Though born out of the groove, the pieces on Six Wheels On My Wagon have a melodic flow which manages to combine elements of surprise and innovation with a hedonistic serenity.

In 1994, Fluke released The Peel Sessions, recorded for the BBC Radio 1 DJ John Peel. This CD was a selection of tracks from two live sessions recorded on 18 November 1990 and 10 December 1991. The CD included one new song, "Time Keeper", and several tracks which had previously been released on vinyl only.

=== Oto and Risotto ===
The following year, Fluke released their third album, Oto, which is the Greek word for "of the ear". In terms of style, Oto was darker and more atmospheric than Six Wheels on my Wagon, focusing on the downtempo ambient techniques which were present in the second half of Six Wheels, with the uplifting house style that characterised their previous work appearing only on select tracks. Two singles were released from Oto; "Bullet" and "Tosh". "Bullet" was chosen by Dominic Pride of Billboard magazine as one of his top ten picks of 1995.

In 1996, Fluke released "Atom Bomb", a single that reached number 20 in the UK singles chart. Originally created as a track for the video game Wipeout 2097, it became the centrepiece of their next album, Risotto. The track was also released as a single from the soundtrack album Wipeout 2097: The Soundtrack, which included another Fluke track "V Six" and tracks from contemporaries The Chemical Brothers, Future Sound of London, Photek, Underworld, Daft Punk, Leftfield and The Prodigy. Fluke's fourth studio album was the pinnacle of Fluke's mainstream chart success with the singles "Atom Bomb" and "Absurd" (sample) and was much more upbeat than the previous album Oto. It was named Risotto after the food dish because, like its culinary counterpart, it contained "a mix of ingredients" and as a pun on the fact that the album featured multiple reworks of tracks from Oto.

Risotto pushes forward Fluke's slick, sophisticated techno at a relentless pace. Sometimes, on Absurd, Atom Bomb and especially the top-notch Squirt, it takes a terrier-like grip on your concentration, with the muted vocals hissing in your head like Martian broadcasts arriving through your fillings.

In 1997, The Lucky Monkeys alias was revived for the release of "Bjango", a single which included a remix by Fluke themselves. This song was based on an early version of their remix of "Hyperballad" for Bjork.

After touring for a year with Risotto on the American "Electric Highway Tour", and having made two appearances at the Glastonbury festival in 1995 and 1998, Tournier left the group to pursue a different project named Syntax, with the band's long standing friend, Jan Burton. They produced a single album, Meccano Mind in March 2004.

=== Puppy and other work after Tournier's departure ===
In 2000, an internal promotional CD named The Xmas Demos surfaced and leaked online, which included early versions of many of the tracks intended for their upcoming album Puppy. Speculation about a new album was furthered when the remaining members of Fluke released a series of singles in 2001 and 2002. "Slap It: The Return" signaled a break from the past, with the writing credits listed simply as "Bryant/Fugler", while "Pulse" exemplified a darker style and was released on the One Little Indian label.

Two "Best Of" albums were also released in 2001 and 2002, Progressive History X, a compilation spanning their ten year producing history, and Progressive History XXX, a three CD box-set including many rare and hard to find mixes.

In 2002, The Fluke DJs were formed, a live-show pairing of Fugler and Hugh Bryder. Bryder was a DJ who had assisted Fluke in their live performances since 1993 and had worked with DJs such as Seb Fontaine while holding a DJ residency at MTV's special event parties. This seemed to indicate further rifts within the band as this DJ combination included neither Bryant nor Tournier. Fugler denied these rumours, claiming that the band merely needed some time away from each other after their intense work on Risotto.

Preceded by the single "Hang Tough", Fluke released their fifth studio album Puppy in 2003, six years after Risotto and their first as a duo. The name of the album was inspired by Jeff Koons' fifty foot sculpture of a puppy that stands outside the Guggenheim museum in Bilbao. This album proved to be similar to the earlier Risotto tracks in tempo and mood, but with the introduction of some new ideas, such as the inclusion of a blues track, "Blue Sky", and a Kraftwerk inspired song called "Expo". Guitarist and touring member Neil Davenport featured on six songs.

The album was not received well critically with most of the critics labelling the album as dated. Andy Gill of The Independent wrote:

Surely the longest-serving of UK dance outfits, Fluke have been a fixture on the national house scene for more than a decade now ... With their endlessly cycling layers of fizzing synths and those big filter-sweeps that were de rigueur a few years back - when the music recedes to nothing, then surges back again - tracks such as "My Spine" and "Hang Tough" could have been made at any time in the past six or seven years. Maybe they were; whatever, they sound a tad cumbersome compared with the leaner garage beats favoured now. In "Snapshot", the juddering synth riff is the techno equivalent of the 12-bar blues, a standard form that has become all too easy for lazy musicians to slip into. Fluke may sing, "It's easy to change/ Go out and get a new name/ Forget yesterday" in "Switch/Twitch", but it is clearly not proving that easy for them to develop beyond their old house style, notwithstanding odd moments such as the freeway glide of "Baby Pain" and the soulful choir on the closing, chill-out number, "Blue Sky". It's Nineties music for a Noughties world.

The only single to be released from Puppy after the album's release was "Switch", which was released in CD and vinyl formats. The track was used on the soundtrack for the Electronic Arts video game Need For Speed Underground 2 but achieved nowhere near the critical or popular acclaim of the singles from Risotto, not even appearing in the UK top 40.

In 2005, Bryant and Fugler started a new project called 2 Bit Pie, teaming up with Jan Burton, Wild Oscar, Robin Goodridge, Dilshani Weerasinghe, Marli Buck and producer Andy Gray. Their first single "Nobody Never" retained the rough vocals and electronic feel that was characteristic of Fluke, but had a stronger emphasis on live playback and real instruments. On 4 September 2006, 2 Bit Pie released their first album, 2Pie Island, in the UK to minimal critical attention. No further albums were released.

Fluke briefly reunited for a live performance, including all three original members, with a show at The Tabernacle in London on 10 October 2009.

=== Return in 2024 and The Second Bite ===
In 2024, Fluke returned from hiatus with the single "Insanely Beautiful", released on 29 April 2024. The new lineup was made up of Mike Tournier, Jon Fugler, and band manager Julian Nugent joining as producer in place of Mike Bryant. Follow-up singles "Real Magnificent", "Jack", and "I Wanna Be" released later in 2024 and 2025.

Their first album in over two decades, The Second Bite, released in June 2026. The album featured reworkings of previous songs, including "Atom Bomb" and "Groovy Feeling".

== Mainstream popularity ==
Although Fluke produced music for the better part of two decades, they remained relatively unknown to a large scale audience and the band members themselves less recognizable. Fugler insisted in an interview with The Independent that the band's reclusivity was "less about selfish hedonism" than the revival of "a communal attitude that had long been forgotten." The main sphere in which the band had success is through their inclusion in advertisements, film and video game soundtracks. Among the more prominent of these appearances was in the 2003 film, The Matrix Reloaded, using the Fluke track "Slap It" (also known as "Another Kind of Blues") in a new form under the name "Zion".

Fluke's 1997 hit "Absurd" was used in the trailer for the 2000 remake of Get Carter, in the strip club sequence of the 2005 film Sin City and the 'Whitewash Edit' is included on the Lara Croft: Tomb Raider soundtrack, which tied in with a commercial deal for Ericsson who sponsored the film and then went on to use "Absurd" in its commercials. In addition, it was used in the video game series NFL QB Club until its discontinuation in 2002. In the "Knight to King's Pawn" episode of the 2008 series of Knight Rider, the song "Absurd" was used by KITT to hide a secret message. "Absurd" is also used as the main theme for Sky Sports' Monday Night Football program first from August 1997 to May 1998 and since August 2010. Fluke's licensing agent, David Steel at V2 Music, tried to ensure that when their tracks are used in films they also appear on the soundtrack album:

Steel acknowledges that he "licensed the track for use in the film on the condition that it would also be included on the soundtrack." In this way, notes Steel, the song "earned significantly more money than if it had just been in the film".

This kind of exposure was welcomed by members of the band, as Fugler said in an interview with Billboard:

A band's success is based on what they do, not what their music is used for. I can only speak for the UK, but I'd find it very surprising if anybody listened to an ad for any kind of normal piece of product and went, 'Oh, I'm gonna take that as being minus points against this band or this composer or this act, because they're selling out.' I don't think anybody views it like that anymore.

In 1997, Fluke's US sales totalled 14,000 which was modest compared with the 200,000 copies of Dig Your Own Hole that The Chemical Brothers sold. In an interview with Billboard magazine, Fugler said that he felt that predicted figures for the US electronica boom were overhyped by people who were out of touch with the music scene. "The expectations came from the people who [had] nothing to do with the music, it came from the business level, people not involved with it." This lack of commercial success has not dampened the spirits of the band however, Fugler going on to say, "It's not about being on the cover of a magazine."

== Live performances ==
Along with Orbital, Fluke were among the earliest performers of electronic music of their kind, releasing the live album Out (In Essence) in 1990. Their live shows employed visual effects combining lasers and projected displays. Furthermore, Fluke's performances came in two varieties of show: performances as Fluke where the shows consist of entirely original Fluke material and shows under the alias "The Fluke DJs" where a combination of Fluke tracks are mixed with others in the style of a DJ set. Unable to attract major crowds, Fluke resorted to "festival-style" tours along with other acts to draw in a sizeable audience, such as on the "Electric Highway" tour in 1997 where they were joined by The Crystal Method and the "Pukkelpop" festival where they headlined with Metallica among others.

When Fluke was touring for Risotto they were joined on stage by Rachel Stewart who acted as a personification of the band's official mascot, a character from the Wipeout series named Arial Tetsuo. Stewart continued as lead female vocalist and as a dancer for all of Fluke's live performances between 1997 and 1999.

While Bryant remained on keyboards and programming and Davenport performed on guitar, Fugler and Stewart were able to motivate the crowd visually with vocals and dancing while Fluke's resident lighting technician, Andy Walton, provided a suitable technology-driven accompaniment to the music. In 2004, Stewart left Fluke indefinitely, instead focusing on a new project with EMF band member James Atkin, named Beauty School.

We threw ourselves into being a live band, but it was always important for us to give people a real show rather than just stand there twiddling knobs.

The number of Fluke's live shows decreased significantly after the release of Puppy owing to their personal commitments to young families. In the few shows since, they have opted for the Fluke DJs set up, which uses "a battery of laptops and the odd deck" rather than focusing on their live band, an approach which Fugler subsequently referred to as "good fun, but ultimately flawed for the dancefloor."

== Members ==
=== Band ===
- Jon Fugler – vocals, lyrics, production (1988–present)
- Julian Nugent – keyboards, production, management (1988-1993), (2024-present)
- Mike Tournier – composer, keyboards, guitar, programming, production (1988-2000, 2024-present)
- Mike Bryant – engineering, keyboards, clarinet, bass, programming, production (1988-1999) composer, programming (2000–2010)

=== Touring members ===
- Hugh Bryder – DJ, turntables
- Neil Davenport – guitars
- Robin Goodridge – drums
- Rachel Stewart – vocals, dancer

== Selected discography ==
- The Techno Rose of Blighty (1991)
- Six Wheels on My Wagon (1993)
- Oto (1995)
- Risotto (1997)
- Puppy (2003)
- The Second Bite (2026)
