= Out (In Essence) =

Live album by Fluke
- Released: August 1991
- Recorded: 1991
- Genre: House, synthpop, techno, electronica
- Label: Astralwerks
- Producer: Fluke

Fluke chronology
The Techno Rose of Blighty (1991)	Out (In Essence) (1991)	Six Wheels on My Wagon (1993)

Professional ratings
Review scores
Source	Rating
AllMusic	3.5/5 stars
Select	4/5 stars

Out (In Essence) is a live album by British electronica group Fluke, first released in August 1991.

== About the album ==
The tracks on this album all came from Fluke's first album, The Techno Rose of Blighty. The album was recorded live at Destination Moon, an acid house party held at the Rolling Stones’ manor house. At this time it was also considered somewhat of a pioneering step for an electronic band to record a live album with band member Jon Fugler commenting, "Nobody believed a dance band could play live. It was a time when you didn’t know if the computer would last the whole show."

== Track listing ==
1. "Pan-Am Into Philly"
2. "Pearls Of Wisdom"
3. "The Bells"
4. "Heresy And The Garden Of Blighty"
5. "Philly" (Techno Rose Remix)
