= Union of Communists of Kurdistan =

Banned Turkish organisation (1986–1990s)

The Union of Communists of Kurdistan (Kurdish: Yekîtîya Komunîstên Kurdistan, YKK) was an illegal Kurdish communist organisation in Turkey formed in 1986 by a split from the Communist Party of Turkey (TKP/B). YKK continued to be clandestinely active until the early 1990s.
