= Oto (album) =

Studio album by Fluke
- Released: 20 July 1995
- Recorded: 1995
- Genre: Breakbeat; progressive house; techno; downtempo; big beat
- Length: 54:52
- Label: Circa
- Producer: Fluke

Fluke chronology
The Peel Sessions (1994)	Oto (1995)	Risotto (1997)

Professional ratings
Review scores
Source	Rating
AllMusic	3/5 stars
Muzik	4/5 stars

Oto is the third studio album by British electronica group Fluke, first released in 1995.

In terms of style, Oto (Greek for ear) was somewhat darker than Fluke's previous Six Wheels on My Wagon, focusing on newer music styles such as big beat, rather than the uplifting house that characterised their previous work.

Both "Bullet" and "Tosh" were later released as double remix CDs, each with one disc of four remixes by Fluke themselves and one of four by other people. "Bullet" was chosen by Dominic Pride of Billboard magazine as one of his top ten picks of 1995.

== Track listing ==
1. "Bullet" - 8:59
2. "Tosh" - 4:29
3. "Cut" - 6:30
4. "Squirt" - 4:24
5. "Wobbler" - 8:47
6. "Freak" - 7:49
7. "O.K." - 7:49
8. "Setback" - 6:01
