= Puppy (Fluke album) =

Studio album by Fluke
- Released: 18 August 2003
- Recorded: 2003
- Genre: Progressive house; downtempo
- Length: 67:13
- Label: One Little Indian
- Producer: Fluke

Fluke chronology
Progressive History XXX (2002)	Puppy (2003)	The Second Bite (2026)

Singles from Puppy
- 1. "Hang Tough" Released: March 10, 2003; 2. "Switch" Released: July 28, 2003

Puppy is the fifth album by British electronica group Fluke, first released on 18 August 2003. The album contains a variety of genres, spanning house to ambient.

== Overview ==
After Risotto, Mike Tournier left the group to form Syntax with Jan Burton. Mike Bryant and Jon Fugler went on to produce Fluke's final studio album, Puppy, without Tournier's help.

There were still signs of life in Fluke's production studio when, in 2000, they produced a Virgin Records-distributed promotional CD named The Xmas Demos, which included early versions of many of the tracks intended for the album Puppy. Four of the tracks on The Xmas Demos would appear on Puppy, while the remaining tracks, "Liquid" and the original "Another Kind of Blues", did not make the final cut. The release of Puppy was significantly delayed by a change to the band's record label, switching from Virgin Records offshoot Circa to One Little Indian. Speculation about a new album was furthered when, in 2003, the remaining members of Fluke released two singles forming the basis of this next album. Though the aptly titled "Slap It: The Return" signaled a break from the past, with the writing credits listed simply as "Bryant/Fugler" under the Appalooso label, "Pulse" exemplified a much darker style and was released on the One Little Indian label. In 2003, Fluke finally released their fifth studio album and first without Mike Tournier, Puppy, six years after their previous effort Risotto. The name of the album was inspired by Jeff Koons' fifty foot sculpture of a puppy that stands outside the Guggenheim museum in Bilbao.

"Snapshot" is featured in Need for Speed: Underground while "Switch/Twitch" is featured in Need for Speed: Underground 2. The latter song was the only single to be released from Puppy after the album's release, and was distributed in CD and vinyl formats. However, it achieved nowhere near the critical or popular acclaim of the singles from Risotto, not even appearing in the UK top 40. "Another Kind of Blues" and "My Spine" are also featured in Total Club Manager 2004.

"Another Kind of Blues" is a 4:37 edit of previously released promotional single, "Slap It" (original length 10:19). Another version, renamed "Zion", is featured in the underground rave scene in the 2003 film The Matrix Reloaded. Puppy's "Another Kind of Blues" is an entirely different song from the track of the same name included on the Xmas Demos.

The track "YKK" is featured in the 2010 film The Experiment.

The number of Fluke's live shows decreased significantly after the release of Puppy, owing to their personal commitments to young families. In the few shows since, they have opted for the Fluke DJs set up, which uses "a battery of laptops and the odd deck" rather than focusing on their live band, an approach which Jon Fugler subsequently referred to as "good fun, but ultimately flawed for the dancefloor."

== Reception ==
Professional ratings
Review scores
Source	Rating
AllMusic	2.5/5
TranceCritic	5/5
Progressive-Sounds	9/10
PopMatters	(positive)
Premonition Magazine	(very positive)
The Independent	(mixed/negative)

Puppy received generally positive reviews. PopMatters described the album as "full of pulsating basslines, gurgling synths, drum machines and treated guitars," though stated that the "limited approach can become a bit frustrating." TranceCritic praised the album, stating that "it confidently ticks just about every box you can ask for, from production quality to groove to energy to emotion to evocation," but criticized the album cover and attributed it to the album's poor commercial performance. Andy Gill of The Independent was more critical of the album, calling it dated and "Nineties music for a Noughties world." Similar remarks were stated by AllMusic, who called the album "long overdue".

== Track listing ==
1. "Snapshot" - 4:09
2. "My Spine" - 7:22
3. "Another Kind of Blues" - 4:37
4. "Hang Tough" - 5:27
5. "Switch/Twitch" - 9:33
6. "YKK" - 6:45
7. "Expo" - 5:18
8. "Electric Blue" - 6:34
9. "Baby Pain" - 5:44
10. "Nebulus" - 5:57
11. "Blue Sky" - 5:48
