= Syntax (band) =

English electronic music group

- Jan Burton and Mike Tournier

Background information
- Origin: London, England
- Genres: Electronic music
- Years active: 2000–2012
- Label: Illustrious Records
- Past members: Mike Tournier; Jan Burton

Syntax was an English electronic music group originally formed in 2000 by the musicians Jan Burton (also the band's vocalist) and Mike Tournier (ex-member of the band Fluke). They are best known for the songs "Destiny", "Bliss" and "Pride".

== History ==
After the success of Fluke's album Risotto, Mike Tournier wanted to move to a much darker production style. He left Fluke and founded Syntax with Jan Burton in 2000.

In 2003, Syntax released their debut album Meccano Mind on Illustrious Records. Meccano Mind is a combination of Burton and Tournier's different influences from rock and dance music. Three singles were issued: "Pray", "Message" and "Bliss" (#69 UK). The Japanese edition included three additional tracks, entitled "Sexograph", "Woman", and "Love Song (I Wonder Why)". Despite the originality of Meccano Mind, the band suffered from poor album sales and the group split in 2004.

Their music has been featured on various TV series, films and video games like The O.C., Nip/Tuck, The Invisible and DRIV3R.

Many years after the split, Syntax reformed, citing that "people were asking for more", and began working on a series of EPs titled Tripolar. The first episode had been completed while work continued on the second and third episodes. Unlike their first album, their second has been released on their own independent label.

== Media usage ==
Syntax's music has been used and highlighted in several TV series, film and video games.

Song	Production	Type
"Bliss"	The Invisible	film
"Bliss"	The Inside	TV series
"Bliss"	Tiger Woods PGA Tour 08	game
"Bliss"	Queer as Folk U.S.	TV series
"Bliss"	Cirque Du Freak: The Vampire's Assistant	film
"Bliss"	Captain America: The Winter Soldier	film
"Destiny"	DRIV3R	game
"Destiny"	Conviction	TV series
"Destiny"	In Time	trailer
"Pride"	The O.C.	TV series
"Pride"	Nip/Tuck	TV series
"Pride"	Bones	TV series
"Pride"	Law & Order: Criminal Intent	TV series
"Pride"	CSI: Crime Scene Investigation	TV series
"Pride"	Kitchen Confidential	TV series
"Pride"	Alice Nevers, le juge est une femme	TV series
"Pride"	Wiener Blut – Die 3 von 144	documentary

== Discography ==
=== Albums ===
- Meccano Mind (2003)
- Tripolar - EP (2012)

=== Singles ===
Year	Single	Peak positions		Album
Year	Single	UK	FR	Album
2003	"Pray" (with a remix from Junkie XL & Dave London)	28	–	
2004	"Message"	–	–	
2004	"Bliss" (with a remix from Felix da Housecat)	69	–	
2011	"Pride"	–	20	

== See also ==
- 2 Bit Pie
- Fluke
