= Mike Tournier =

- Birth name: Michael James Tournier
- Born: 24 May 1963 (age 61); High Wycombe, Buckinghamshire, England
- Genres: Electronic, trip hop, IDM
- Occupation(s): DJ, record producer
- Instrument(s): Keyboards, mixing console, programming, guitar
- Years active: 1988–present

Michael James Tournier (born 24 May 1963) is an English electronic musician, and one of the co-founders of the electronic music group Fluke, along with Mike Bryant and Jon Fugler. He first met with other members of Fluke in High Wycombe where he had been involved, along with Jon Fugler, in a band called Skin.

== Life and career ==
Tournier attended the John Hampden Grammar School, High Wycombe. Little information is known of Tournier's history prior to his incorporation into Fluke in Beaconsfield, Buckinghamshire, and remains a high point in his career. The band's conception was influenced by Tournier's interest in acid house music and particularly Cabaret Voltaire and Giorgio Moroder. Tournier stayed with Fluke until approximately 1998 when he left the group to collaborate with Jan Burton on Syntax's Meccano Mind. The partnership with Syntax split up after an album and two singles.

Touriner's music career has spanned different genres, which he has not seen as a problem, stating "I think it just goes to show that what you want out of music isn't necessarily as narrow minded as it being just guitars, or computers, it's about feeling."
