= The Techno Rose of Blighty =

Studio album by Fluke
- Released: 1991 (Creation Edition); 1993 (Circa Edition)
- Recorded: 1991
- Genre: House, synthpop, techno, electronic
- Length: 32:47
- Label: Creation
- Producer: Fluke

Fluke chronology
| The Techno Rose of Blighty (1991) | Out (In Essence) (1991) |

Professional ratings
Review scores
| Source | Rating |
|---|---|
| AllMusic | 4/5 stars |

The Techno Rose of Blighty is the debut album by British electronic music group Fluke, released in 1991.

The name is based upon Blighty, being slang for Great Britain; and parodies the title of the song "The Yellow Rose of Texas"; it is also ironic, as the album is not particularly techno-based. The album was re-released as LP edition in 1993 at Circa Records with bonus tracks.

== Overview ==
Before forming Fluke, Jon Fugler and Mike Bryant had played in two punk bands together named The Leaky Radiators and The Lay Figures. The third member of Fluke, Mike Tournier, was introduced to the group when he undertook work on a collaboration with Fugler entitled "Skin". It soon became clear that all three shared musical tastes, having a shared interest in the acid house scene and the more experimental electronic sounds of Cabaret Voltaire and Giorgio Moroder.

Fluke's first single, released in 1988, was a white label vinyl entitled "Island Life", pressed on a clear blue 12" vinyl record. Although a commercial failure, as well as being very different in sound to the band's later works, the group persisted and released another two white label vinyls: "Thumper!" in 1989 and "Joni/Taxi" in 1990, a song that sampled Joni Mitchell's "Big Yellow Taxi". The attention that these records received gained the band a record deal with Creation Records with whom they released their first CD single, "Philly", in the same year.

In the following year, Fluke released their first album, The Techno Rose of Blighty, swiftly followed by the single "The Bells" and a live album entitled Out (In Essence). For the release of Out (In Essence), Fluke abandoned their deal with Creation Records and signed instead with Circa Records, an offshoot of Virgin. All tracks on Out came from The Techno Rose of Blighty and were recorded live at Destination Moon, an acid house party held at the Rolling Stones' manor house. At this time, it was also considered somewhat of a pioneering step for an electronic band to record a live album with band member Jon Fugler commenting, "Nobody believed a dance band could play live. It was a time when you didn't know if the computer would last the whole show."

At this early stage in their career, the band realized that they would experience the greatest artistic freedom if they had their own recording studio and took it upon themselves to obtain their own premises. This was an asset which, according to Fugler, proved invaluable in coordinating the "wider pool of people — musicians and friends — that we draw on to help".

== Track listing ==
1. "Philly" – 7:06
2. "Glorious" – 5:53
3. "Cool Hand Flute" – 3:54
4. "Joni" – 5:15
5. "Easy Peasy" – 4:09
6. "Phin" – 6:30

Bonus tracks from 1993 LP edition

1. "Jig" - 5:03
2. "Taxi" - 4:10
3. "Coolest" - 2:50

A 2-disc set consisting of this album and Six Wheels on My Wagon was released, featuring all nine tracks of this album on one disc and Six Wheels on the second.
