= Jan Burton =

Welsh record producer and vocalist

Jan Burton is a Welsh record producer and vocalist, best known for his work with ex-Fluke member Mike Tournier in their joint project, Syntax. In December 2017, Burton announced that he was engaged in his first solo project.

He also provided vocals for Dangerous Power, a song by 'Best Ortofon American DJ' of 2007 according to the International Dance Music Awards, Gabriel & Dresden which reached No. 1 Hot Dance Club Play, No. 4 Hot Dance Airplay and won 'Best Alternative/Rock Dance Track' in the IDMA.

In 2010, Burton provided vocals for the songs "Traces Remain", and "I've Had Friends" on Morgan Page's album Believe. Burton has collaborated on Super8 & Tab's debut album, a trance group within the Anjunabeats label, and he is on four of the songs on the 2010 album Empire. He performed vocals in two songs on Metrik's "The Departure" EP. In 2011, he did the vocals for Eric Prydz's single "Niton (The Reason)". In October 2014, Burton did two more songs with Super8 & Tab for their album Unified, released on Anjunabeats. On the 17th of december, Burton released a song alongside Ilan Bluestone called "Rule The World".

In November 2017, Burton provided vocals on Gabriel & Dresden's single "Waiting for Winter", also released on Anjunabeats.

Burton frequently writes with former Dub Federation founder, Pete Latham.

== See also ==
- 2 Bit Pie
- Fluke
- Syntax
- Gabriel & Dresden
