= 2Pie Island =

Studio album by 2 Bit Pie
- Released: September 2006
- Recorded: 2006
- Genre: Electronica
- Label: One Little Indian
- Producer: 2 Bit Pie

Professional ratings
Review scores
Source	Rating
ProgressiveSounds	(9/10)
TranceCritic	4/5 stars
AllMusic	3.5/5 stars

2Pie Island is the first and only album by British electronica group 2 Bit Pie, considered to be an incarnation of Fluke. It was released in September 2006. The instrumental version of "Here I Come" was featured in the Electronic Arts video games Tiger Woods PGA Tour 07 and The Sims Pet Stories.

== Track listing ==
No.	Title	Length
1.	"Fly"	6:01
2.	"Here I Come"	4:40
3.	"Colours"	6:15
4.	"Nobody Never"	4:01
5.	"Soto Mundo"	6:28
6.	"PIL"	4:07
7.	"Little Things"	7:23
8.	"Mote"	4:13
9.	"Slipaway"	4:23
10.	"After Hours"	7:23
