= Mike Bryant =

British musician

Michael James Bryant (born 1 May 1960) is an English electronic musician and one of the co-founders of the electronic music group Fluke along with Jon Fugler and Mike Tournier. He first met with other members of Fluke in High Wycombe.

== Life and career ==
B was born in High Wycombe, Buckinghamshire, England on 1 May 1960. Fluke formed in 1988 in Beaconsfield, Buckinghamshire.
