= Six Wheels on My Wagon =

Studio album by Fluke
- Released: 7 October 1993
- Recorded: 1993
- Genres: Electronic, techno, IDM, ambient house
- Length: 76:43
- Label: Astralwerks
- Producer: Fluke

Fluke chronology
Out (In Essence) (1991)	Six Wheels on My Wagon (1993)	The Peel Sessions (1994)

Six Wheels on My Wagon is the second studio album by British electronic music group Fluke, released on 7 October 1993. The title parodies the song "Three Wheels on My Wagon". The most prominent track on the album, "Slid" is featured in the 1993 Phillip Noyce film Sliver as well as being a club favourite of popular DJ Sasha.

== Overview ==
At the early stage in their career, the band realized that they would experience the greatest artistic freedom if they had their own recording studio and took it upon themselves to obtain their own premises. This was an asset which, according to Fugler, proved invaluable in coordinating the "wider pool of people — musicians and friends — that we draw on to help".

After a two-year break, Fluke returned with what became a breakthrough into mainstream popular music when, in 1993, they released the single "Slid". This became an instant club classic when it was picked up by DJ Sasha who liked it so much that he included three separate remixes of it on his Renaissance album. This burst of success was followed by two further singles, "Electric Guitar" () and "Groovy Feeling", and, in the same year, the release of the group's second album, Six Wheels on My Wagon.

This new album was a distinctly house music production, with uplifting riffs and ambient effects, as opposed to the techno style of their previous release. The album was structured so that the more accessible "pop" tracks were to be found at the beginning of the album and the more ambitious ambient works towards the end.

== Reception ==
Professional ratings
Review scores
Source	Rating
AllMusic	4/5 stars
Billboard	(positive)
The Independent	(positive)
Select	4/5 medals

Six Wheels on My Wagon was received favourably by critics, with Billboard magazine labelling it "groundbreaking". Other reviewers went further, with The Independent suggesting that Fluke was to become the next big thing in Europe:

Fluke's Six Wheels on My Wagon represents the current high-water mark of modern ambient-groove music, showing that although this mode has effectively become the future sound of Europe, it's rarely done as well on the continent as in Britain. Though born out of the groove, the pieces on Six Wheels on My Wagon have a melodic flow which manages to combine elements of surprise and innovation with a hedonistic serenity.

== Track listing ==
1. "Groovy Feeling" - Make Mine a 99" - 7:12
2. "♥ Letters" - 6:42
3. "Glidub" - 6:16
4. "Electric Guitar" - Humbucker " - 7:24
5. "Top of the World" - 5:40
6. "Slid" - Pdfmone" - 7:41
7. "Slowmotion" - 5:11
8. "Spacey" (Catch 22 Dub)" - 6:09
9. "Astrosapiens" - 6:48
10. "Oh Yeah" - 5:46
11. "Eko" - 5:22
12. "Life Support" - 6:28
