= When Everyone Wore Hats =

Studio album (book set) by Daniel Amos
- Released: 1995/2001
- Recorded: Various
- Genre: Rock music
- Label: Stunt Records
- Producer: Terry Scott Taylor

When Everyone Wore Hats is a book set from rock band Daniel Amos, released in 2001 on Stunt Records.

The collection included a softcover book with a new story written by frontman Terry Taylor, and three CDs of music. One CD featured the original Songs of the Heart album by Daniel Amos. A second disc included many of the songs rerecorded with brand new acoustic arrangements. A third disc included bonus tracks and an interview of Terry Taylor conducted by Jason Martin of Starflyer59.

== Track listing ==
Disc One
Songs of the Heart

1. "Can't Take My Eyes Off of You" (Gaudio/Crewe)
2. "The Glory Road" (Words by Taylor, Music by Daniel Amos)
3. "Get Into the Bus, Aloha" (Words by Taylor, Music by Daniel Amos)
4. "Evangeline" (Words by Taylor, Music by Daniel Amos)
5. "Uneasy Liews The Head of the Confidence Man" (Words by Taylor, Music by Daniel Amos)
6. "The Organ Bar" (Words by Taylor, Music by Daniel Amos)
7. "Donna Nietche And Her Super Race of Kick Boxing Uber Parrots" (Words by Taylor, Music by Daniel Amos)
8. "Our Night to Howl, Time to Go Dancing" (Words by Taylor, Music by Daniel Amos)
9. "Sins of the Fathers" (Words by Taylor, Music by Daniel Amos)
10. "Turn This Off" (Words by Taylor, Music by Daniel Amos)
11. "Loveland" (Words by Taylor, Music by Daniel Amos)
12. "When Everyone Wore Hats" (Words by Taylor, Music by Daniel Amos)
13. "My Hand to God" (Words by Taylor, Music by Daniel Amos)

Disc two
Acoustic Cafe band

1. "Donna Nietche And Her Super Race Of Kick Boxing Uber Parrots"
2. "Trois Gymnopédies No. 1" (instrumental)
3. "The Glory Road" / "Can't Take My Eyes Off of You"
4. "Get Into the Bus, Aloha"
5. "Evangeline
6. "Uneasy Lies The Head of the Confidence Man"
7. "The Organ Bar"/"Our Night to Howl, Time to Go Dancing"
8. "Sins of the Fathers"
9. "Loveland"
10. "When Everyone Wore Hats"
11. "My Hand to God"
12. "The Glory Road, Pt 2"

Disc three
Bonus Material

1. "Part One" (Interview)
2. "Your Hidden Hand" (Taylor)
3. "Part Two" (Interview)
4. "Turn This Off"
5. "Part Three" (Interview)
6. "The Devil's Elbow" (Taylor)
7. "Interview" (Interview)

== Personnel ==
- Terry Scott Taylor: Vocals, Guitars
- Ed McTaggart: Drums, Percussion
- Tim Chandler: Bass, Trombone, Guitar
- Greg Flesch: Organ, (Greg also plays Guitar, Accordion, and other assorted musical instruments)
- Jerry Chamberlain: Guitar
- Gene Eugene: Special cameo appearance on the Keyboards

== Production ==
- Produced By Terry Taylor and DA for Stunt Productions
- Executive Producers: Eric Townsend & Jason Townsend
- Bookset Compiled and Produced by Brian Heydn and Johnathan Feavel
