= Zoom Daddy =

Album by The Swirling Eddies

Studio album by The Swirling Eddies
- Released: 1994
- Studio: The Green Room, Huntington Beach, California
- Genre: Rock
- Label: Alarma
- Producer: Terry Scott Taylor

The Swirling Eddies chronology
Outdoor Elvis (1989)	Zoom Daddy (1994)	The Berry Vest of the Swirling Eddies (1995)

Professional ratings
Review scores
Source	Rating
AllMusic	3/5 stars

Zoom Daddy is the third album by rock band The Swirling Eddies, released in 1994 on Alarma Records. It was released almost simultaneously with Terry Scott Taylor's other project, the Daniel Amos album Bibleland.

The Swirling Eddies dropped their pseudonyms for this album, listing their real names in the credits.

The album was dedicated to Mark Heard.

== Track listing ==
1. "I Had A Bad Experience With the C.I.A. and Now I'm Gonna Show You My Feminine Side" (words and music by Terry Taylor, David Raven and Tim Chandler)
2. "Mr. Sharky" (words and music by Terry Taylor, David Raven and Tim Chandler)
3. "(Disco) Love Grapes" (words and music by Terry Taylor, David Raven and Tim Chandler)
4. "Nightmare At the Elks Lodge" (words and music by Terry Taylor, David Raven and Tim Chandler)
5. "The Golden Girl of the Golden West" (words and music by Terry Taylor, David Raven, Tim Chandler and Jerry Chamberlain)
6. "Sweet Mother of God" (words and music by Terry Taylor, David Raven and Tim Chandler)
7. "The Twist" (words and music by Terry Taylor, David Raven, Tim Chandler and Jerry Chamberlain)
8. "God Went Bowling" (words and music by Terry Taylor, David Raven, Tim Chandler and Jerry Chamberlain)
9. "Multipurpose Man" (words and music by Terry Taylor, David Raven and Tim Chandler)
10. "Pyro Sets A Wildfire" (words and music by Terry Taylor, David Raven and Tim Chandler)
11. "Some Friendly Advice" (words and music by Terry Taylor, David Raven and Tim Chandler)
12. "Art Carney's Dream" (words and music by Terry Taylor, David Raven, Tim Chandler and Jerry Chamberlain)
13. "Holy, Holy, Holy" (words and music by Terry Taylor, David Raven, Tim Chandler and Jerry Chamberlain)
14. "Zoom Daddy" (words and music by Terry Taylor, David Raven and Tim Chandler)

== Personnel ==
- Terry Scott Taylor who sings the vocals and plays most of the guitars.
- Tim Chandler who plays bass and some occasional rhythm guitar.
- David Raven who plays drums and percussion.
- Jerry Chamberlain who plays lead guitars.
- Greg Flesch who plays occasional guitar and piano.
- Gene Eugene who plays most of the keyboards and piano.

Production notes

- Engineered by Gene Eugene and Terry Taylor.
- Executive Producer Matthew Duffy.
- Mixed at the Mixing Lab by Gene Eugene.
