= Mr. Buechner's Dream =

Studio album by Daniel Amos
- Released: 2001
- Recorded: The Green Room, Huntington Beach, California
- Genre: Alternative rock, folk rock
- Label: Stunt, Galaxy21
- Producer: Daniel Amos

Daniel Amos chronology
Songs of the Heart (1995)	Mr. Buechner's Dream (2001)	Dig Here Said the Angel (2013)

Professional ratings
Review scores
Source	Rating
AllMusic	2.5/5 stars

Mr Buechner's Dream is the thirteenth studio album by Christian alternative rock band Daniel Amos, issued in 2001 by Stunt Records. It was the band's first album in six years - and last for twelve years - and the only double album in their catalog.

== Background ==
Although the album includes over 30 songs, the band did not set out to record a double album. "I think Chris Colbert (the band's engineer) thought we were a little crazy. It’s my sense that the sheer joy of being together again in a creative setting after a seven years absence opened the floodgates of the creativity I believe is unique to Daniel Amos", explains Taylor, the band's lyricist.

Lyrically the album reflected the tumultuous events experienced by members of the band in recent years: the death of two young and very dear friends, including producer and studio owner Gene Eugene, cancer in Taylor's family, and in the families of other close friends.

The "Mr Buechner" referred to in the title is Pulitzer Prize nominated author Frederick Buechner, who has been a major inspiration on the band's lyrics for years. The album also pays tribute to authors Walker Percy, T. S. Eliot, G. K. Chesterton, Flannery O'Connor, Lewis Carroll, and Dorothy L. Sayers.

Some of the studio sessions and rehearsals for the album were filmed by friends of the band. Those films were later edited together to create a "behind the scenes" DVD, appropriately entitled The Making of Mr. Buechner's Dream.

== Reissue ==
For the album's tenth anniversary in 2011, Stunt Records rereleased the CD with an expanded booklet and one bonus track - "Nowhere Is Someplace," a song that was originally only released through the band's website in 2001 and on the Making of.. DVD.

== Track listing ==
All lyrics by Terry Scott Taylor, and music by Daniel Amos.

=== Mr Buechner's Dream (The First Collection) ===
1. "This is the One" (2:18)
2. "Mr. Buechner's Dream" (1:23)
3. "The Author of the Story" (4:49)
4. "Your Long Year" (3:52)
5. "Who's Who Here?" (4:06)
6. "Thick Skin" (2:54)
7. "Ribbons & Bows" (3:23)
8. "Ordinary Extraordinary Day" (3:20)
9. "I Get to Wondering" (2:56)
10. "Faithful Street" (2:36)
11. "The Lucky Ones" (2:10)
12. "Rice Paper Wings" (2:39)
13. "The Tale You Told" (2:43)
14. "Meanwhile" (3:10)
15. "Over Her Shoulder" (3:01)
16. "The Staggering Gods" (3:24)
17. "A Little Grace" (2:30)
18. "My Beautiful Martyr" (3:54)
19. "Mr. Buechner Wakes Up" (0:40)
20. "Joel" (3:17)

=== And So It Goes (The Second Collection) ===
1. "Pretty Little Lies" (4:12)
2. "Child on a Leash" (2:55)
3. "Small Great Things" (2:55)
4. "Nowhere Is Someplace" only on the 2011 re-issue (2:24)
5. "Easy for You" (4:38)
6. "Maybe All I Need" (3:17)
7. "Pregnant Pause" (3:26)
8. "She's a Hard Drink" (2:44)
9. "So Far So Good" (3:47)
10. "Flash in Your Eyes" (a song for Gene Eugene) (3:30)
11. "Nobody Will" (2:50)
12. "Fingertips" (3:10)
13. "Steal Away" (2:44)
14. "And So it Goes" (18:56) (the song ends at 3:40, followed by silence and an untitled hidden song begins at 17:48; on the 2011 re-issue the silence and hidden song are split onto tracks 15–16)

== Personnel ==
- Tim Chandler — bass and guitars
- Greg Flesch — guitars, piano, keyboards, harmonica, accordion, and mandolin
- Ed McTaggart — drums and percussion
- Terry Scott Taylor — guitars and lead vocals

== Additional musicians ==
- Vince Hizon — saxophone on "She's A Hard Drink" and "Faithful Street"
- Tim Jacobs — trumpet on "She's A Hard Drink" and "Faithful Street"
- Frank Lenz — additional keyboards and percussion
- Shaunte Palmer — trombone on "She's A Hard Drink" and "Faithful Street"

== Production notes ==
- Produced by Daniel Amos.
- Executive Producers: Daniel Amos, Eric Townsend, Jason Townsend, JT Feavel.
- Recorded and mixed by Chris Colbert @ "The Fabulous Green Room", Huntington Beach, California, with additional engineering by Frank Lenz and T.S. Taylor.
- Digital editing by Andrew Pricket.
- Mastering by Chris Colbert @ The Green Room.
- Jacket design by Ed McTaggart, The Color Edge, Costa Mesa, California.
- New layout and design by Eric Townsend, and Tom Gulotta.
- Proofreading assistance by Kenny Paxton and Ron Easton.
- Photos by Kristy McTaggart, Ed McTaggart, Jason Hoffman, Dennis Grimaud, and Tom Gulotta.
