= Outdoor Elvis =

Studio album by The Swirling Eddies
- Released: 1989
- Studio: The Mixing Lab A & B, Los Angeles, California
- Genre: Rock
- Label: Alarma
- Producer: Camarillo Eddy

The Swirling Eddies chronology
Let's Spin! (1988)	Outdoor Elvis (1989)	Zoom Daddy (1994)

Professional ratings
Review scores
Source	Rating
AllMusic	2.5/5 stars

Outdoor Elvis is the second album by rock band The Swirling Eddies, released in 1989 on Alarma Records.

The title track found the Swirling Eddies in search of the elusive Elvis Presley who, according to the song, escaped the city by faking his own death and decided to make his home in the wilderness. The song makes parallels between the search for Elvis, the search for Bigfoot and mankind's search for a king or "savior."

This project gave the Swirling Eddies their first hit songs - "Driving In England" which made it all the way to #1 in some markets, and "Hide the Beer, the Pastor's Here" which also created a small amount of controversy for the album. The latter song tells the tale of a Christian College professor that hides his own hidden sins and attacks his students for their obvious drinking habits. At the end of the song, "Spot" shouts out the name of Christian Colleges around the United States. Some of these colleges were upset that they were mentioned in the song while others were upset that they weren't included.

One song on the album, "Mystery Babylon," had earlier been premiered on the Swirling Eddies Apology Video, which had been sent out to fans that ordered the Spittle & Phlegm video collection.

Outdoor Elvis marks the first appearance of new Swirling Eddies member Prickly Disco. It is also the first appearance of the guest Eddie known as Miracle Babe, whom contributes background vocals on the album.

== Track listing ==
All lyrics and music by Camarillo Eddy except where noted.

1. "Outdoor Elvis"
2. "Driving In England"
3. "Urban Legends"
4. "Tiny Town"
5. "Attack of the Pulpit Masters"
6. "Mystery Babylon"
7. "Arthur Fhardy's Yodeling Party" (lyrics and music by Camarillo Eddy, Spot, Arthur Fhardy)
8. "Hell Oh"
9. "Blowing Smoke"
10. "Hide the Beer, the Pastor's Here"
11. "Hold Back the Wind, Donna"
12. "Knee Jerk"
13. "Don't Hate Yourself"
14. "All The Way To Heaven"
15. "Rubber Sky"
16. "CoCo the Talking Guitar"
17. "Yer' Little Gawd"
18. "Billy Graham"
19. "Potential"
20. "Strange Days"
21. "Elimination (The Band That Won't Go Away)"

== Personnel ==
- Camarillo Eddy – guitars and vocals
- Gene Pool – lead guitars, keyboards
- Arthur Fhardy – keyboards, first vocal on (7)
- Spot – guitars, third vocal on (7)
- Berger Roy Al – bass guitar
- Prickly Disco – guitars, backing vocals and additional keyboards, second vocal on (18)
- Hort Elvison – drums

Additional musicians

- Miracle Babe: backing vocals.
- Jeb McSwaggart: percussion.
- Horns provided by the Horns O' Plenty under the direction of Buckeye Jazzbo.

Production notes

- Engineered by Prickly Disco.
- Mixed by Camarillo Eddy and Prickly Disco.
- Recorded and Mixed at Mixing Lab A & B, Los Angeles, California.
- Art Direction and Design by Jeb McSwaggart.
