= The Making of Mr. Buechner's Dream =

- Directed by: Tim Chandler; Tom Gulotta; Dennis Grimaud; Eric Townsend; Jason Townsend
- Written by: Daniel Amos
- Produced by: Daniel Amos; Eric Townsend; Jason Townsend
- Starring: Terry Scott Taylor; Tim Chandler; Greg Flesch; Ed McTaggart
- Cinematography: Tim Chandler; Tom Gulotta; Dennis Grimaud
- Music by: Daniel Amos
- Distributed by: Stunt Records
- Release date: July 8, 2005
- Running time: 81 minutes
- Country: United States
- Language: English

The Making of Mr. Buechner's Dream is a DVD released in 2005 by the American rock band Daniel Amos on Stunt Records.

The 90 minute film was edited together from over nine hours of randomly filmed home movies and footage made while the band was recording their epic 32 song album, Mr. Buechner's Dream.

This "making of" documentary shows the band at work rehearsing the new songs and recording in the studio. Many "making of" documentaries, like The Beatles Let It Be do not actually show a lot of footage of the band recording what is actually found on the album. For example, many of that film's performances are different takes or rehearsals. In this film however, much of what is shown on the screen is the band recording exactly what is found on the album - from guitar solos, to vocals, to bass tracks.

The film starts out letting the viewer roam around the band while it's rehearsing in drummer Ed McTaggart's house in California. The band is seen going through several of the songs from the album and working out chord changes. In most cases, the lyrics to the songs were not yet finished at this point so lead singer Terry Scott Taylor is seen improvising lyrics while the band plays.

The next segment is an introduction to The Green Room studios and a short tribute to longtime D.A. engineer and friend, Gene Eugene, set to the music of "Flash In Your Eyes," a song written about the late engineer and friend of the band.

The rest of the film is inside the studio as the band works out guitar, bass, vocals, and drum tracks. The viewer gets to see the creative process as each band member takes part in making suggestions and giving their own ideas on each track. Also included in this segment is a number of comedy segments that the band put together in between sessions.

Bonus material on the DVD includes a live performance by the band at the 2001 Creation Festival.

Because much of this film is simply home movie footage filmed by the band itself, there are some quality issues from time to time. Lighting is not always the best and there are a few scenes with some digital noise in the audio. The producers of the film did their best to minimize these problems, but they are still noticeable at times.

== See also ==
- Frederick Buechner
