= Live Bootleg '82 =

Live album by Daniel Amos
- Released: 1990
- Genre: Rock
- Label: Stunt
- Producer: Daniel Amos

Professional ratings
Review scores
Source	Rating
Allmusic	link

Live Bootleg '82 is the title of a live album by rock band Daniel Amos, released on Stunt Records in 1990.

Recorded in St. Louis, Missouri by Bruce A. Brown in April, 1982, this album gave fans a glimpse into a typical D.A. concert in the early 1980s. Having gone in a harder rock/new-wave direction, they abandoned the country-rock songs of their first two albums. This set (as seen on the "Uncut" edition) culled three songs from Horrendous Disc and nine from ¡Alarma!, both released the previous year, along with three songs from Doppelgänger which would not be released for a year and three songs never released on an album.

The album also includes their well-known "Surf Suite", which they had performed in differing fashions for several years. It led off with a new-wave take on The Beach Boys' "Surfin' U.S.A.", the instrumental surf classic "Wipe Out", followed by D.A.'s own surfing-inspired songs "Endless Summer" and "(Near Sighted Girl with Approaching) Tidal Wave".

== Track listing ==
=== Original release ===
All songs written by Terry Scott Taylor unless noted.

1. "I Love You #19"
2. "I'm On Your Team" * Previously Unreleased (Note: This song also appears, in a newly recorded studio version, on the 1990 Miracle Faith Telethon album, a collection of previously released, modified and new music by Daniel Amos, The Swirling Eddies and Terry Scott Taylor.)
3. "Faces To The Window"
4. "Mall All Over The World"
5. "Everyone's Fallen Down" * Previously Unreleased
6. "Baby Game"
7. "Through the Speakers"
8. "Alarma!"
9. "Love Has Open Arms" * Previously Unreleased
10. "Hit Them (With Love)"
11. "Hound of Heaven"
12. "Ghost of the Heart"
13. "The Surf Suite"
  - "Surfin' U.S.A." (Brian Wilson, Chuck Berry)
  - "Wipe Out" (Bob Berryhill, Pat Connolly, Jim Fuller, Ron Wilson)
  - "(Near Sighted Girl With Approaching) Tidal Wave"
  - "Endless Summer" (Taylor, Jerry Chamberlain)

=== "Uncut" re-issue ===
All songs written by Terry Scott Taylor unless noted.

1. "I Love You #19" - 3:16
2. "I'm On Your Team" * Previously Unreleased - 2:29
3. "Faces To The Window" - 2:23
4. "Mall All Over The World" - 3:11
5. "Everyone's Fallen Down" * Previously Unreleased - 3:25
6. "Baby Game" - 2:40
7. "Love Has Open Arms" * Previously Unreleased - 3:25
8. "Surf Suite Intro" - 4:05
9. "The Surf Suite" - 7:36
  - "Surfin' U.S.A." (Brian Wilson, Chuck Berry)
  - "Wipe Out" (Bob Berryhill, Pat Connolly, Jim Fuller, Ron Wilson)
  - "(Near Sighted Girl With Approaching) Tidal Wave"
  - "Endless Summer" (Taylor, Jerry Chamberlain)
10. "Alarma!" - 2:39
11. "Hit Them (With Love)" - 2:38
12. "Hound of Heaven" - 3:54
13. "Through the Speakers" - 2:42
14. "Ghost of the Heart" - 2:20
15. "Big Time Big Deal" - 2:34
16. "I Didn't Build It for Me" (Taylor, Chamberlain) - 2:49
17. "New Car" - 2:12
18. "Walls of Doubt" - 3:47
19. "I Love You #19 (reprise)" - 1:44

== Personnel ==
- Jerry Chamberlain - lead guitar, backing vocals
- Tim Chandler - bass guitar, backing vocals
- Ed McTaggart - drums, backing vocals
- Terry Scott Taylor - lead vocals, rhythm guitar

== Production notes ==
- Compiled by Tom Gulotta and Terry Scott Taylor.
- Layout by Court Patton & Tom Gulotta.
- Live concert production by Bruce Brown.
- Concert Originally Recorded and Mixed by Tom Brooks and Bruce Brown for KBK Studios, using a Yamaha console, Shure, AKG, and Neuman mics (Thanks Mark E.), and Otari 8-Track and 2-Track machines.
