= Dig Here Said the Angel =

Studio album by Daniel Amos
- Released: 2013
- Recorded: The Brown Owl, Berry Hill, TN
- Genre: Alternative rock, post-rock
- Label: Stunt
- Producer: Daniel Amos

Daniel Amos chronology
| Mr. Buechner's Dream (2001) | Dig Here Said the Angel (2013) |

Dig Here Said the Angel is the fourteenth studio album by Christian alternative rock band Daniel Amos. Issued in 2013, it was the band's first album in twelve years and was funded primarily through a fundraising campaign on the website Kickstarter.

== Background and Kickstarter campaign ==
This album marks the first by Daniel Amos for which the band used the popular Kickstarter website to generate its recording budget. The original goal for the project was a bare-bones budget of $14,000. With help from around 500 contributors, the band made its initial goal within 24 hours and quickly surpassed it, eventually raising more than $32,000 before the initial campaign had ended. An extended campaign, partially begun to raise money for a planned vinyl version of the album, quickly raised more than $10,000 to add to the original amount.

By February 2013, the band entered the Brown Owl Studios in Berry Hill, TN and later emerged with 11 new songs. The album became a reunion of sorts - bringing in past band members Jerry Chamberlain, Rob Watson, Marty Dieckmeyer and Alex MacDougall to add their musical touches to the album. It also reunited the band with its 1980s engineer and roadie, Derri Daugherty, who engineered and mixed the project.

The entire production of the project - from the original rehearsals and demos, to the studio sessions in Nashville - was filmed for a planned DVD documentary release.

== Artwork ==
Contributions from the band's fans did not end with the Kickstarter campaign. Through a request on the band's website and Facebook pages, fans were allowed to contribute dozens of pieces of artwork inspired by the album's title. Those contributions were then merged into collages that were used in every aspect of the album's artwork.

== Track listing ==
All lyrics by Terry Scott Taylor, and music by Daniel Amos, except "Waking Up Under Water" by Jerry Chamberlain and Terry Scott Taylor.

1. "Forward In Reverse"
2. "Jesus Wept"
3. "Dig Here Said the Angel"
4. "Our New Testament Best"
5. "Love, Grace and Mercy"
6. "Now That I've Died"
7. "We'll All Know Soon Enough "
8. "Waking Up Under Water"
9. "The Uses of Adversity"
10. "The Ruthless Hum of Dread"
11. "The Sun Shines On Everyone"

== Personnel ==
- Tim Chandler — bass, background vocals
- Greg Flesch — guitars, mando-guitar, keyboards, background vocals
- Ed McTaggart — drums
- Terry Scott Taylor — vocals, guitar, backing vocals

Additional personnel

- Paul Averitt — additional backing vocals
- Jerry Chamberlain — guitar and lead vocal on "Waking Up Under Water", background vocals
- Steve Hindalong — percussion
- Alex MacDougall — percussion
- Eric Townsend — additional backing vocals
- Rob Watson — keyboards
- Sunshine Street Choir (on "The Sun Shines on Everyone") — Paul Averitt, Jerry Chamberlain, Tim Chandler, Pete Coatney, Marty Dieckmeyer, Frank Lee Drennen, Noël Ferro, Spencer Ferro, Greg Flesch, Tom Gulotta, Ed McTaggart, Theo Obrastoff, Eve Selis, Debi Taylor, T.S. Taylor, Eric Townsend, Jason Townsend, Rob Watson

== Production notes ==
- Engineered by Derri Daugherty
- 2nd engineer: Mark Zellmer
- Recorded at the Brown Owl Studio, Berry Hill, TN & Sled Dog Studios, Franklin, TN
- Mastered by Gary Hedden
- Art Direction & Design by Tom Gulotta
- Front and back cover imagery by Memo Salazar
- Band photo: Memo Salazar & Tom Gulotta

Artwork contributors

Jimmy A, Scott Anderson, Wayne Barnett, Alen Blazekovik, Charles Bradford, Amy Stone Brown, Cherokee Carr, Jamison Chaleen, Maria Chandler, Jerry Creager, Matt Crosslin, Dave Danglis, Jason Derr, DW Dunphy, Daria Dykhanovska, Paul Estes, Tom Gulotta, Bryce Hendry, Alex Hernandez, Amalia Howard, Sarah Issler, Christian Kuebler, Derek Luptak, David Pence, Ritchie Roesch, Eric Ruhaak, Damian Sawyer, Brian Thomas, Eric Townsend, Jason Townsend, Michael Turkett, Daiv Whaley, Curtis Whittier

Special Thanks to: S Anderson, Roger W. Basl, Mark D. Cazalas, codedonkey, Thom Granger, Jouni Gronroos, Robert Hawes, Jr, Mike Indest, Wayne "Lobstermuchacho" Kierstead, Alexander William Leitch, Douglas M. McNeill, Adel Meisenheimer, Aaron Metcalfe, Eddie Parrino, Ken "Harpo" Paxton, David & Jackie Quackenbush, Jerry Roberts, Jeff and Ann Sauder, Rich and Suzie Snow, & Tim Soto.
