= Solid Rock Records =

American record label

- Founded: 1975
- Founder: Larry Norman
- Distributor: Word Records
- Genre: Various
- Country of origin: United States

Solid Rock Records is a record label started by Larry Norman. It was established in 1975 to distribute his work after he had been released by Capitol Records. Solid Rock had a distribution deal until 1980 with Word Records.

The label's roster also included Randy Stonehill, Tom Howard, Mark Heard, Daniel Amos, Pantano & Salsbury (formerly known as the J.C. Power Outlet), and Salvation Air Force. Norman worked with David Edwards, who released his debut album on Myrrh Records in 1980, as well as Steve Scott. Scott recorded two albums, Moving Pictures, produced by Norman and Heard and Closeups which remained unreleased until a successful 2025 Kickstarter

== History ==
=== Origins ===
Strongly influenced by Christian philosopher Francis Schaeffer, Schaeffer's community at L'Abri in Switzerland (which Norman had visited with his wife Pamela on his honeymoon in 1972), and "possibly inspired by the Apple imprint of The Beatles" in 1974, Norman founded Solid Rock Records to produce records for Christian artists who like himself, had "no commercial value." He intended Solid Rock to be "a "musical L'Abri", and "more than business though, it was community." "Solid Rock became an important moment in the history of Christian rock music since it was the first truly artist-driven label". According to Norman, the purpose of Solid Rock was "to help other artists who didn't want to be consumed by the business of making vinyl pancakes but who wanted to make something 'non-commercial' to the world". Solid Rock "was a community of shared ideas and discussion. Artists worked on each other's projects and even toured together.

It seems to have been a place where they were trying to create art that would cross over. Larry Norman in particular had a desire to not simply create Christian music but music that was from a Christian worldview that would stand up in the mainstream and that people could accept and be challenged by". According to Solid Rock alumnus Tom Howard: "We ate together, laughed together, cried together, travelled together. It wasn't like a cult or anything; I mean we'd go off to our own families and our own pockets of friendships but there was definitely a sense of gathering among that small handful of artists". In addition to his own recordings, Larry Norman produced music for several artists on his Solid Rock label: Randy Stonehill, Mark Heard, Tom Howard, Pantano/Salsbury, and Salvation Air Force. Norman produced artists who were signed to other labels like Malcolm and Alwyn, Bobby Emmons and the Crosstones, and Lyrix. While Norman received production credits for two songs on Sheila Walsh's first album Future Eyes, he remixed the songs which were already recorded. In 1977 he signed James Sundquist to Solid Rock, which produced some of the songs on Sundquist's Freedom Flight, an album that blended ragtime and ballads which was later released by Pat Boone's Lamb & Lion label. About 1978 Norman produced an album, Moving Pictures, for British poet and musician Steve Scott which was never released.

=== Daniel Amos (1978–1980) ===
In December 1978 Norman signed Christian rock band Daniel Amos to Street Level Productions and also to his Street Level Artists Agency. Daniel Amos had almost completed Horrendous Disc, their third album, co-produced by Mike D. Stone, when under contract to Maranatha! Music. When Maranatha! released them, as it was changing direction to children's and praise music, Horrendous Disc still needed to be mixed. Norman asked the band to replace two songs, had the album mixed and took new photos of the band for the album's cover to replace those he deemed too controversial for the Christian market, and in September 1979, Norman released a test pressing. In mid-May 1980 Norman released Daniel Amos from their management contract with Street Level Productions, resulting in an estrangement in their relationship. Just before the finalization of his divorce from Pamela Norman in August 1980, Norman performed at the Kamperland Youth for Christ Music festival (now the Flevo Totaal Festival) in Zeeland the Netherlands with Daniel Amos band backing him. Due to the laryngitis of Terry Scott Taylor, lead singer of Daniel Amos, Norman sang their songs from Horrendous Disc with the rest of Daniel Amos backing him so that Daniel Amos could be paid.

==== Solid Rock implosion (1980) ====
At the Greenbelt Festival held a few days later, Daniel Amos refused to back Norman as previously agreed due to their unfolding legal action against Norman, forcing Norman to recruit another group of musicians. During that performance, Norman sang for the first time, "May Your Feet Stay On The Path", as a beatific benediction to the Solid Rock artists he had released. He explained in 2001: "It's a song I wrote for all my artists because I wasn't going to work with them any more. So I stayed up one night praying all night and working on this song asking God to help me bless the artists one more time so that they would know that I loved them even if I didn't want to work with them". Despite being advertised as soon available in November 1979, Horrendous Disc was not finally released by Solid Rock until April 10, 1981, ten days before the band's follow-up ¡Alarma!, was released on NewPax Records. In 2000 Norman sang "Hound of Heaven" on the Daniel Amos tribute album, When Worlds Collide: A Tribute to Daniel Amos.

=== The end of Solid Rock ===
==== June 17, 1980 meeting ====
In June 1980 the Solid Rock community imploded due to concerns about delays in releasing albums, royalties and publishing rights, and Norman's personal life. One of the areas of disagreement within Solid Rock was over their philosophy of ministry. The concerns of Stonehill, Taylor, and Howard in addition to other Solid Rock musicians led to an intervention on June 17, 1980 with Norman organized by Philip F. Mangano, the Solid Rock business manager. According to Rimmer, Fallen Angel claims that "it was at this memorable meeting that Norman, rather than bowing to the concerns of his fellow artists and the Solid Rock family, chose to strike out. With accusations against his co-workers, he began the process of winding up the Solid Rock operation and the dreams of the artistic community came crashing down."

==== Winding down ====
Norman and Mangano severed their business association, with Norman selling his interest in Street Level Artists Agency to Mangano, who subsequently resigned in October 1980 to start a new career in working to help the homeless. Mangano became the executive director of the United States Interagency Council on Homelessness for seven years from March 2002,

By October 1981 Norman was still represented by Word and the only artist signed to Solid Rock. In a 1982 interview with British Christian musician Norman Miller, then Executive Director of Word Europe, Norman discussed both the original purpose for Solid Rock and its future:

I have very few plans for Solid Rock at all. Originally, I started Solid Rock as a way of helping other young artists become established. My plan has always been to provide them with an intense education, support their efforts with concerts and record production, and then graduate them into the mainstream where they can stand on their own feet. I've been able to get Randy Stonehill to the point where Myrrh Records has signed him directly, while others, like Mark Heard, Tom Howard, and Daniel Amos have all signed with different American companies like New Pax. I've helped about fifteen people get contracts so far, and all the old Solid Rock crowd has graduated and I'm working with new and younger artists now.

=== Analysis & Norman's comments ===
American Christian rock historian John J. Thompson identifies several factors in the collapse of Solid Rock, including possibly an over reliance on Norman's celebrity; Norman's confrontational lyrics and music, which alienated both the Christian and mainstream music industries; Norman's over-commitment, including producing almost all of the Solid Rock albums, contributing songs, and singing backing vocals; and "by releasing high-quality music by the best bands, Norman doomed his label to almost certain failure. He was simply way ahead of the curve". Additionally, the emergence of several punk-influenced Christian bands in the late 1970s, who "cranked out music that made Larry Norman and Love Song look like antiques. Some of them even considered the members of Daniel Amos to be geezers".

American professor of religious history Randall Balmer believed that the causes of the demise of Solid Rock were "Idealism, marital difficulties, and financial naivete—as well as changing musical tastes". Stonehill opined in 1994, "As artistically heady as the days at Solid Rock were... and as good as the ideas were on paper, the business end was always very loose-knit... We were young guys with good ideas but not a whole lot of business sense". Norman acknowledged in a 1984 interview: "I've never been really good in the business side of it. I haven't had a problem with creativity but I've never had the business side of it together." In a 1998 letter to Randy Stonehill, Norman indicated:

"I DIDN'T DO IT RIGHT: You know I never cared about money, so it's something I never worried about. Which was probably not helpful to running a record company and keeping track of everything to the artists' satisfaction... I couldn't run the label without competent assistants. I trusted Philip [Mangano] to keep track of royalties, gave him an open checkbook, and never looked over his shoulder. I thought he was my other half. And Philip just wasn't that man. He made a lot of money... and I'm sorry about your royalties, but I ran the musical side and Philip ran the business side".

Norman gave his rationale for the winding up of Solid Rock Records in a 1989 interview: "I couldn't run Solid Rock Records anymore because of my mental condition due to an accident, I couldn't concentrate. I couldn't finish anybody's album. I couldn't get any work done in the office, it was just real hard... I'd already done the one album for each artist that I'd promised, and I wanted to liberate them and get them signed up with a real big record company. But they all wanted to stay together because that was what they knew....I hadn't intended to produce any second albums for any of the artists. They were all out of contract. My contract wasn't really a contract to hold them to me. I had a contract with them because Word required it of Solid Rock. So, I just gave them their contract back as soon as their album was out. There was a lot of personal strife in everybody's life. My wife had decided she wanted to marry somebody else and all of the artists at the same time were leaving their wives, and I just thought this was an appropriate time for introspection. I didn't want to be up on stage and having kids come back afterwards and ask me why everyone was getting divorced. The tensions of the Solid Rock community resulted in the fracturing of several personal and professional relationships, Norman's departure overseas, the dispersal of the Solid Rock artists to other labels, and to the formation of Phydeaux Records. He became "a musical hermit, ceasing relationships with record companies and focusing on selling his music directly to his fans through the mail".

=== Post 1980 ===
In February 1992, Norman had a heart attack and limited the activities of his record label until his death in 2008, but work continued to release CD versions of archival material from the 1970s.

== Selected discography ==
- In Another Land, Larry Norman, 1976
- Welcome to Paradise, Randy Stonehill, 1976
- View from the Bridge, Tom Howard, 1977
- On Turning to Dust, Mark Heard, 1978
- Appalachian Melody, Mark Heard, 1979
- The Sky Is Falling, Randy Stonehill, 1980
- Horrendous Disc, Daniel Amos, 1981
- Something New under the Son, Larry Norman, 1981 (recorded in 1977)
- Friends On Tour, Larry Norman & Friends, 1981
- Get Me Out of Hollywood, Randy Stonehill, 1999 (recorded in 1973)

== See also ==
- Larry Norman discography
- List of record labels
