= MotorCycle =

Studio album by Daniel Amos
- Released: 1993
- Studio: The Golden Recording Room, Huntington Beach, California; Neverland Studios, Cerritos, California; McCrums, Whittier, California
- Genre: Neo-psychedelia, alternative rock
- Label: BAI
- Producer: Terry Scott Taylor, Jerry Chamberlain, Daniel Amos

Daniel Amos chronology
Kalhöun (1991)	MotorCycle (1993)	BibleLand (1994)

Professional ratings
Review scores
Source	Rating
AllMusic	4.5/5 stars

MotorCycle is the tenth studio album by Christian alternative rock band Daniel Amos, issued in 1993 on BAI Records. It was the band's first album under the Daniel Amos moniker - as opposed to the shortened DA - since Vox Humana in 1984.

The album saw the band temporarily shift their sound to neo-psychedelia and saw the return of longtime guitarist Jerry Chamberlain. The album was dedicated to the memory of singer-songwriter Mark Heard, who died in 1992. Writing for AllMusic, J. Edward Keyes described the album as "meticulously crafted, haunting, and beautiful beyond words ... a psych-pop tour de force."

"Grace is the Smell of Rain" was later rerecorded by lead singer Terry Scott Taylor's other band, the Lost Dogs, for their 2004 album MUTT.

== Track listing ==
1. "Banquet at the World's End" (words and music by Taylor) (3:47)
2. "Traps, Ensnares" (words and music by Taylor/Chamberlain) (3:49)
3. "Hole in the World" (words and music by Taylor) (5:32)
4. "(What's Come) Over Me" (words and music by Taylor) (3:48)
5. "Buffalo Hills" (words and music by Taylor) (4:24)
6. "Guilty" (words and music by Taylor) (4:35)
7. "Motorcycle" (words by Taylor, music by Taylor/Flesch/Chandler) (3:33)
8. "Wonderful" (words by Taylor/Chamberlain/McCall, music by Taylor/Chamberlain) (2:16)
9. "So Long" (words and music by Taylor) (0:56)
10. "My Frontier" (words and music by Taylor) (3:48)
11. "Grace is the Smell of Rain" (words by Taylor, music by Taylor/Chamberlain) (4:01)
12. "Noelle" (words and music by Taylor) (2:43)
13. "Wise Acres" (words and music by Taylor) (2:14)
14. "So Long Again" (words by Taylor, music by Taylor/Chamberlain) (2:53)

== Personnel ==
- Jerry Chamberlain — lead and rhythm guitars, lap-steel guitar, electric sitar, backing vocals, lead vocal on "Wonderful", cover concept
- Tim Chandler — bass guitar and backing vocals
- Greg Flesch — lead and rhythm guitars, pan flute, and squeeze box
- Ed McTaggart — drums, percussion, backing vocals, art direction
- Terry Scott Taylor — guitars, harmonica, lead vocals, backing vocals, cover concept
- Gene Eugene — piano, audio engineer
- Steve Hindalong — additional percussion
- Buckeye Dan Michaels — trumpet
- Rob Watson — piano, organ, and synthesizer
- Sharon McCall — backing vocals
- Bob Moon — additional engineer
- Dave Hackbarth — additional engineer
- Chris Colbert — additional engineer
- The Golden Recording Room, Huntington Beach, California — recording location, mixing location
- Neverland Studios, Cerritos, California — recording location
- McCrums, Whittier, California — recording location
- Doug Doyle — mastering
- Digital Brothers — mastering location
- Bruce Heavin — cover concept, illustration
- Daniel Amos — musical arrangements
- Wax Lips Studios — pre-production demo recording location
