= Songs of the Heart =

Studio album by Daniel Amos
- Released: 1995
- Studio: The Green Room, Huntington Beach, California; Desert Moon Studios, Anaheim, California
- Genre: Christian alternative rock
- Label: BAI
- Producer: Terry Scott Taylor, Daniel Amos

Daniel Amos chronology
BibleLand (1994)	Songs of the Heart (1995)	Mr. Buechner's Dream (2001)

Professional ratings
Review scores
Source	Rating
AllMusic	2.5/5 stars

Songs of the Heart is the twelfth studio album by Christian alternative rock band Daniel Amos, released on BAI Records in 1995.

== Concept ==
The album's concept is a musical journey down legendary Route 66 with the fictional couple Bud & Irma Akendorf. This concept was partially conceived after discovering an LP hanging on the wall of their rehearsal hall. The LP, which was released in the early 1960s and entitled Songs of the Heart, was by a singing gospel duo by the name of Bob and Elsa Beckendorf. The cover featured the couple pictured in Oak Creek Canyon. The band, inspired by the cover, decided to explore the lives of a fictional couple, which they named Bud and Irma Akendorf. The released cover of D.A.'s Songs of the Heart is an exact copy of the original LP by the Beckendorfs, with the artist name replaced. It turned out that the Beckendorfs were from Sedona, Arizona, which happened to be the home of Daniel Amos' founder Terry Scott Taylor's paternal grandparents.

Songs was later re-envisioned in the form of a three-CD book set, When Everyone Wore Hats. "Hats" included the entire original release plus the entire album rerecorded as an acoustic coffeehouse band, three bonus tracks, an interview about the album, new photos, liner notes and a short story by Taylor.

== Track listing ==
All lyrics by Taylor and music by Daniel Amos, except where noted.

1. Can't Take My Eyes Off You (Gaudio/Crewe) (4:57)
2. The Glory Road (3:21)
3. Get Into the Bus, Aloha (2:32)
4. Evangeline (3:28)
5. Uneasy Lies the Head of the Confidence Man (4:39)
6. The Organ Bar (3:56)
7. Donna Nietche and her Super Race of Kick Boxing Uber Parrots (1:15)
8. Our Night to Howl, Time to Go Dancing (2:35)
9. Sins of the Fathers (3:50)
10. Turn This Off (1:04)
11. Loveland (4:12)
12. When Everyone Wore Hats (5:27)
13. My Hand to God (3:50)

== Personnel ==
- Jerry Chamberlain – guitars
- Tim Chandler – bass guitar, guitar, and trombone
- Greg Flesch – guitars, accordion, and organ
- Ed McTaggart – drums and percussion
- Terry Scott Taylor – rhythm guitars and lead vocals

Additional musicians

- Gene Eugene – keyboards

Production notes

- Executive Producers – Ojo Taylor and Gene Eugene
- Engineering – Terry Taylor and Gene Eugene
- Recorded at The Green Room, Huntington Beach, California
- Additional Recording at Desert Moon, Anaheim, California
- Mixed by Gene Eugene at the Green Room, and the Mixing Lab, Garden Grove, California.
- Cover Photo – George Jordan.
- Art Direction and Layout – Ed McTaggart at the Color Edge, Costa Mesa, California and Tom Gulotta at Patton Brothers, San Diego, California.
