= Our Personal Favorite World Famous Hits =

Compilation album by Daniel Amos
- Released: 1998
- Recorded: Various
- Genre: Rock music
- Label: KMG Records

Our Personal Favorite World Famous Hits is a compilation album, from rock band Daniel Amos, released in 1998 on KMG Records.

== Track listing ==
1. "Walls of Doubt" [from Alarma!] 1981
2. "Alarma!" [from Alarma!] 1981
3. "Darn Floor - Big Bite" [from Darn Floor - Big Bite] 1987
4. "Broken Ladders" [from Bibleland] 1994
5. "I'll Get Over It" [from Bibleland] 1994
6. "If You Want To" [from Kalhoun] 1991
7. "The Pool" [from Fearful Symmetry] 1986
8. "Mall (All Over The World)" [from Doppelganger] 1983
9. "I Love You #19" [from Live Bootleg '82] 1982
10. "Hound Of Heaven" [from Live Bootleg '82] 1982
11. "Twilight Love" [Live] Unreleased 1979
12. "Grace Is The Smell of Rain" [from Motor Cycle] 1993
13. "Noelle" [from Motor Cycle] 1993
14. "When Everyone Wore Hats" [from Songs of the Heart] 1995
15. "Sanctuary" [from Vox Humana] 1984
16. "Soon" [from The Revelation] 1986
17. "Father's Arms" [from Shotgun Angel] 1977
18. "Ain't Gonna Fight It" [from Maranatha 5] 1975

== Personnel ==
- Terry Scott Taylor: Vocals, Guitars
- Jerry Chamberlain: Guitars, Vocals
- Ed McTaggart: Drums
- Tim Chandler: Bass
- Greg Flesch: Guitars
- Marty Dieckmeyer: Bass
- Mark Cook: Keyboards, Vocals
- Rob Watson: Keyboards
- Alex MacDougall: Percussion

== Production ==
- Compiled by Tom Gulotta and Terry Taylor
- Artwork by Douglas TenNapel
- Layout by Tom Gulotta
