= BibleLand =

Bibleland

Studio album by Daniel Amos
- Released: 1994
- Recorded: The Green Room (Huntington Beach, California)
- Genre: Alternative rock, noise pop
- Label: BAI
- Producer: Terry Scott Taylor

Daniel Amos chronology
MotorCycle (1993)	Bibleland (1994)	Songs of the Heart (1995)

Professional ratings
Review scores
Source	Rating
AllMusic	3/5 stars

Bibleland is the eleventh album by Christian alternative rock band Daniel Amos, released in 1994 by BAI Records. The album's loud, distorted noise pop sound is atypical for the band.

The title song mocks cheap religious merchandise in the form of a fictional amusement park (based on several real parks) called "Bibleland." The album's artwork includes a "Circus" style gatefold illustration by Douglas TenNapel.

== Track listing ==
All words and music by Taylor except where noted.

1. Broken Ladders to Glory (4:05)
2. Bibleland (2:56)
3. Theo's Logic (3:21)
4. Low Crawls and High Times (3:41)
5. Bakersfield (6:20)
6. Out in the Cold (5:03)
7. The Bubble Bursts (4:16)
8. Pete and Repeat (4:11)
9. Constance of the Universe (4:09)
10. I'll Get Over It (4:39)
11. She's Working Here (4:16)
12. Stone Away (words by Taylor, music by Taylor/Chandler/McTaggart) (4:48)

== Credits ==
- Jerry Chamberlain — guitars
- Tim Chandler — bass guitar, rhythm guitar on "Bibleland"
- Greg Flesch — guitars
- Ed McTaggart — drums
- Terry Scott Taylor — rhythm guitars, lead vocals, engineer

Additional musicians

- Gene Eugene — piano on "I'll Get Over It", executive producer, engineer, mixing

Production notes

- Ojo Taylor – executive producer
- The Green Room, Huntington Beach, California – recording location
- Mixing Lab A – mixing location
- The Green Room – mixing location
- Doug Doyle – mastering
- Digital Brothers – mastering location
- Tom Gulotta – art direction, design, photography, digital editing
- Court Patton – art direction, design, photography, digital editing
- Patton Brothers Design, San Diego, California – art direction, design, photography, digital editing
- Ed McTaggart at the Color Edge, Costa Mesa, California – scanning, color proofing, film output
- Trisha Kluck – band photo
- Doug TenNapel – illustrations
