= Horrendous Disc =

Studio album by Daniel Amos
- Released: April 1981
- Recorded: 1978–1980
- Studio: Whitefield Studios, Santa Ana, California
- Genre: Rock
- Label: Solid Rock
- Producer: Daniel Amos, Mike D. Stone

Daniel Amos chronology
Shotgun Angel (1977)	Horrendous Disc (1981)	¡Alarma! (1981)

Horrendous Disc is the third studio album by Christian rock band Daniel Amos. Originally recorded in 1978 for Maranatha! Music, it was not released until 1981 when it was issued by Larry Norman's Solid Rock Records, weeks before the release of the band's fourth album. The album is noted as a departure from the band's early country rock sound.

== Background ==
DA had almost completely abandoned the country sound of their first record by late 1977 and early 1978, when this album was recorded with co-producer Mike D. Stone.

The album was dropped by Maranatha! Music after the label decided to quit releasing rock and roll albums and focus on children's releases and the new praise style of gospel music. So the band, now without a record contract, began to shop the project around to various labels like Curb/Warner Brothers. Word bought the tapes from Maranatha! and Larry Norman's Solid Rock Records, home to such artists as Randy Stonehill, Tom Howard, Mark Heard, and others, leased the recordings from Word. Norman had the album mixed and took photos of the band for the album's cover. In July 1979, Norman released a test pressing with a different track listing and slightly different mix. This pressing was distributed to reviewers and extra copies were taken on tour.

Some of the songs from the album, like "Hound of Heaven" were being performed by the band in concert as early as 1977. The album was first heard by the public on the Rock & Religion Radio Show on January 20, 1980, when the test pressing was aired. Prior to this broadcast, music from the album was only heard in live performances. Several tracks were played and the band was interviewed about what they had hoped would be their soon-to-be-released album. For reasons that remain a mystery, the album was shelved by Solid Rock until its long overdue release in April 1981, nearly three years after it had been recorded and just weeks before the band's follow up on Newpax Records, ¡Alarma!, hit record stores.

== Reissues ==
This album frequently appeared at the top of Christian Music magazine readers polls of the "album that people most wanted to see released on CD," until its eventual reissue on CD in 2000. It was listed at No. 63 in the book CCM Presents: The 100 Greatest Albums in Christian Music.

The CD re-release stirred controversy among Daniel Amos fans by the inclusion of two bonus tracks: Tribute recordings that Norman recorded for the When Worlds Collide: A Tribute to Daniel Amos CD that he decided to include at the end of the Horrendous Disc CD. The covers sung by Norman were of his favorite Daniel Amos song – "Hound of Heaven". One recording was a straight-ahead tribute version of the song and the second tribute recording was a version using a very laid–back jazz band. The decision to include these cover tracks on the CD, along with some long, wandering liner notes, bewildered DA fans.

Daniel Amos had approached Norman and Solid Rock Records about putting together a "Deluxe Edition" of Horrendous Disc in 2006 with the original Horrendous Disc on the first disc and many bonus tracks on the second disc. Norman's health delayed the project and he died before it could be finished. In the years that followed Norman's death, DA has once again began to work with Solid Rock to create the ultimate Horrendous Disc reissue.

Work on the deluxe edition, a collaborative project between Stunt Records and Solid Rock Records, with a Kickstarter crowdfunding campaign to generate the production budget, began in 2017. Due to the success of the campaign, what started as a plan to simply re-release the album with one or two bonus discs, grew into a definitive five-CD box set, five-vinyl box set and a book, The Horrendous Book. The five-CD box set was released on July 20, 2018.

== Reception ==
Professional ratings
Review scores
Source	Rating
AllMusic	5/5 stars

Upon its release, CCM found its sound to be "bizzare [sic], multifacited [sic]" compared to the group's other releases. AllMusic gave a positive retrospective review, praising the "blistering riffs" of "I Love You #19", the "sardonic humor and wit" of "(Nearsighted Girl With Approaching) Tidal Wave", and the "spooky concept-album-type finish" of the title track, but concluding the entire release to be "A great album all around."

== Track listings ==
=== July 1979 test pressing order ===
- Flying Saucer sounds
- "On the Line"
- "Never Leave You"
- "I Believe in You"
- "Tidal Wave"
- "Sky King"
- "I Love You #19" +
- "Man in the Moon
- "Hound of Heaven" +
- "Horrendous Disc"

+ these tracks were re-recorded for the final release

=== US track listing ===
Master Cylinder One

1. "I Love You #19" (Taylor)
2. "Hound of Heaven" (Taylor)
3. "(Near Sighted Girl With Approaching) Tidal Wave" (Taylor)
4. "Sky King (Out Across the Sky)" (Taylor)

Master Cylinder Two

1. "On the Line" (Taylor)
2. "I Believe in You" (Taylor)
3. "Man in the Moon" (Chamberlain)
4. "Never Leave You" (Cook)
5. "Horrendous Disc" (Cook, Chamberlain, Taylor)

=== UK release track list ===
Side one

1. "I Love You #19"
2. "Hound of Heaven"
3. "I Believe in You"
4. "Sky King (Out Across the Sky)"

Side two

1. "On the Line"
2. "Never Leave You"
3. "After All These Years" (Taylor)
4. "Horrendous Disc"

=== Canadian reissue ===
The Canadian re-issue omits "Never Leave You". However, Word Canada still had labels, sleeves, and jackets from the first pressing so, not wanting to be wasteful, the disc was mastered to appear to have five tracks on side two by visually splitting "Horrendous Disc".

=== CD Reissue ===
1. "I Love You #19"
2. "Hound of Heaven"
3. "Near Sighted Girl (With Approaching Tidal Wave)"
4. "Out Across the Sky (Sky King)"
5. "On the Line"
6. "I Believe in You"
7. "Man in the Moon"
8. "Never Leave You"
9. "Horrendous Disc"
10. "Hound of Heaven" (performed by Larry Norman)
11. "Hound of Heaven" (another version performed by Larry Norman)

=== 2007 CDR ===
1. "On the Line (Extended Version)"
2. "Out Across the Sky (Sky King)"
3. "I Love You #19"
4. "Man in the Moon"
5. "The Hound of Heaven"
6. "Never Leave You"
7. "Near Sighted Girl (With Approaching Tidal Wave)"
8. "I Believe in You"
9. "Horrendous Disc"
10. "Fairy Tale" (previously unreleased)
11. "After All These Years" (only released on the UK album version)
12. "That Girl Likes To Talk (Yak, Yak, Yak)" (previously unreleased)
13. "Twilight Love" (previously unreleased, except as a live version on the album Our Personal Favorites)
14. "Noelle" (previously unreleased; different from the song of the same title on Motor Cycle)
15. "Hello Aloha" (previously unreleased)

== Personnel ==
- Terry Scott Taylor - lead vocals and guitars, second lead vocal on "Horrendous Disc"
- Jerry Chamberlain - lead guitar and vocals, lead vocals on "Man in the Moon" and "Horrendous Disc"
- Mark Cook - keyboards and vocals, lead vocal on "Never Leave You"
- Marty Dieckmeyer - bass guitar
- Alex MacDougall - drums, percussion
- Ed McTaggart - drums, percussion
- Sharon McLaughlin: Female Vocals
- Janet McTaggart: Female Vocals
- Kim Hutchcroft: Saxophone on "On The Line."
- Photos and Recordings provided by the Daniel Amos and Solid Rock Archives
- Engineers: Mike Stone, Thom Roy, Wally Grant, Jonathan Brown, Rob Wasson and Tim Jaquette
- Mixed by Ken Suesov, Mike D. Stone, Mark Heard, and Daniel Amos. "I Believe In You" by Jonathan Brown
- Alternate mixes: Eric Townsend, Doug Doyle
- Original photography and album design by Larry Norman
- Deluxe Edition Project Supervisors: Eric Townsend, Tom Gulotta, Jason Townsend
