= The Revelation (Daniel Amos album) =

Remix album by Daniel Amos
- Released: 1986
- Recorded: 1977, 1986
- Genre: Country, rock
- Label: Frontline
- Producer: Daniel Amos

Professional ratings
Review scores
Source	Rating
AllMusic	2.5/5 stars

The Revelation is a 1986 remix album by rock band Daniel Amos, released on Frontline Records.

The Revelation is a reworking of the popular "side 2" of the band's 1977 album, Shotgun Angel. All of the tracks were remixed, and one new song was recorded, the Phil Spector inspired "Soon". Also, added for this new collection were narrations between songs by Calvary Chapel Pastor Chuck Smith, reading from the Book of Revelation.

== Track listing ==
1. "Finale: Bereshith Overture" (Stipech/Taylor/Chamberlain/Cook) 6:03
2. "Lady Goodbye" (Taylor/Chamberlain/Cook) 3:59
3. "The Whistler" (Taylor/Chamberlain/Cook) 5:23
4. "He's Gonna Do a Number On You" (Cook) 2:28
5. "Better" (Taylor/Chamberlain/Cook) 6:48
6. "Sail Me Away" (Taylor/Chamberlain) 6:28
7. "Posse In the Sky" (Taylor) 6:23
8. "Soon" (Taylor) 11:02

Track times include narrations between songs

== The band ==
- Terry Scott Taylor – rhythm guitars and lead vocals
- Ed McTaggart – drums
- Jerry Chamberlain – guitar
- Mark Cook – keyboards
- Marty Dieckmeyer – bass guitar
- Tim Chandler – bass guitar ("Soon")
- Greg Flesch – guitar ("Soon")
- Rob Watson – keyboards ("Soon" and incidental music)
