= The Sky Is Falling (album) =

Studio album by Randy Stonehill
- Released: 1980
- Recorded: 1977–1978
- Genre: Rock
- Label: Solid Rock
- Producer: Larry Norman

Randy Stonehill chronology
| Welcome to Paradise (1976) | The Sky Is Falling (1980) | Between the Glory and the Flame (1981) |

Professional ratings
Review scores
| Source | Rating |
|---|---|
| AllMusic | 2/5 stars |

The Sky Is Falling is an album by Randy Stonehill, released in 1980, on Solid Rock Records.

== Track listing ==
All songs written by Randy Stonehill.

=== Original, US vinyl release ===
Side one

1. "One True Love" – 4:10
2. "Through The Glass Darkly" – 5:50
3. "Teen King" – 4:25
4. "The Great American Cure" – 4:00
5. "Venezuela" – 6:50

Side two

1. "Counterfeit King" – 5:30
2. "Jamey's Got The Blues" – 4:00
3. "Bad Fruit" – 4:55
4. "Emily" – 5:40
5. "Trouble Coming" – 4:50

=== 1994 CD reissue ===
The 1994 CD reissue is of the 1980 European version, with tracks 9–13 as bonus tracks not included on the original European version.

1. "One True Love" – 4:17
2. "Bad Fruit" – 5:08
3. "Jamey's Got The Blues" – 4:08
4. "Through The Glass Darkly" – 5:53
5. "The Great American Cure" – 3:59
6. "Venezuela" – 7:01
7. "Emily" – 5:41
8. "Trouble Coming" – 4:48
9. "Counterfeit King" (alternate mix) – 5:16
10. "Teen King" (alternate mix) – 4:42
11. "Postcards From The Heart (Letter To My Family)" – 5:19
12. "King Of Hearts" (the orchestral version) – 3:14
13. "Good News" (Live From Greenbelt) – 4:54

=== 2004 CD reissue ===
Larry Norman released the album in the original order on CD in 2004, but substituting the alternative mixes of "Teen King" and "Counterfeit King". It also included the three bonus tracks from the 1994 release.

1. "One True Love" – 4:17
2. "Through The Glass Darkly" – 5:53
3. "Teen King" (alternate mix) – 4:42
4. "The Great American Cure" – 3:59
5. "Venezuela" – 7:01
6. "Counterfeit King" (alternate mix) – 5:16
7. "Jamey's Got The Blues" – 4:08
8. "Bad Fruit" – 5:08
9. "Emily" – 5:41
10. "Trouble Coming" – 4:48
11. "Postcards From The Heart (Letter To My Family)" – 5:19
12. "King Of Hearts" (the orchestral version) – 3:14
13. "Good News" (Live From Greenbelt) – 4:54

== Personnel ==
- Randy Stonehill – lead vocals, harmony vocals, electric guitars, acoustic guitars
- Tom Howard – acoustic piano, keyboards, Moog synthesizer, orchestrations
- Larry Norman – acoustic piano, electric guitars, acoustic guitars, autoharp, koto, harmonica, electric bass, marimba, steel drums, harmony vocals
- Jon Linn – electric guitars, slide guitar, volume control guitar and fiery fingers
- Bill Batstone – bass
- Dave Coy – bass
- Peter Johnson – drums
- Alex MacDougall – drums, percussion
- Sarah Finch – backing vocals
- Steve Scott – augmented jungle chanting on "Bad Fruit"

== Production ==
- Produced and Arranged by Larry Norman, a Solid Rock Studios production.
- Ken Suesov – engineer and mixdowns
- Andy Johns – additional engineering and olfactory dismemberment (also known as Andrew "Just-like-that" Johns)
- Photography, album design, artwork, sandwiches and kitchen sink by Larry Norman, D.R.R.
- Paste-up and doo-wops – Little Bobby Emmons
