= Daniel Amos (disambiguation) =

Daniel Amos is an American Christian rock band.

Daniel Amos may also refer to:

- Daniel Amos (album), self-titled album by the rock band
- Dan Amos (born 1951), chief executive officer of insurer Aflac
- Danny Amos (footballer, born 1987), Israeli professional footballer
- Danny Amos (footballer, born 1999), English-born Northern Irish footballer
