= Rock & Religion Radio Show =

Rock & Religion (a.k.a. Rock Scope) was a syndicated radio program based in Sacramento, California, USA. The program began in 1977 and ran through 1981. The show was produced by Mary Neely, and hosted by Neely, and singer Michael Roe. Although it is not currently being broadcast, recordings and original promotional vinyl copies of the shows are heavily traded to this day. The program generally aired on Sunday nights.

The show, which focused on spiritual themes in rock music, featured music and interviews from artists like Bob Dylan, The Rolling Stones, Roger McGuinn of The Byrds, The Who, Daniel Amos, Phil Keaggy, Randy Stonehill, Joe English of Paul McCartney's Wings, T-Bone Burnett & The Alpha Band, Mark Heard, Keith Green (there is a recording of the Rock & Religion broadcast of the 1979 Keith Green interview on the Last Days Ministries website; see "Keith Green Interview" link below) and many others.

In certain cases, the show included rare or unreleased music from artists. Popular examples included Roe's own band The 77s, which was featured on the show in 1980 when they were still known as The Scratch Band. Music from Daniel Amos' long delayed Horrendous Disc appeared on the radio show more than a year before the album was finally released.
