= Gene Eugene =

Canadian actor, musician, songwriter, record producer and audio engineer

Background information
- Born: Gene Andrusco; April 6, 1961; Fort Frances, Ontario, Canada
- Died: March 20, 2000 (aged 38) Huntington Beach, California, U.S.
- Genres: Rock, alternative rock, funk rock
- Occupations: Record producer, singer, songwriter
- Instruments: Vocals, guitar, keyboards
- Works: Adam Again, Lost Dogs, The Swirling Eddies
- Years active: 1982–2000
- Website: adamagain.com

Gene Andrusco (April 6, 1961 – March 20, 2000), better known as Gene Eugene, was a Canadian-born actor, record producer, engineer, composer, and musician. Eugene was best known as the leader of the alternative rock band Adam Again, a member of the Swirling Eddies (credited as Prickly Disco), and as a founding member of the supergroup Lost Dogs.

Prior to his music career, Eugene was a child actor. On top of his own musical projects, Eugene was a record producer producing albums for other contemporary Christian artists ranging from Crystal Lewis to the Prayer Chain to Starflyer 59. Eugene was married to musician and fellow Adam Again band member Riki Michele until they divorced in 1994. Eugene was found dead in his studio on March 20, 2000 as a result of an undiagnosed brain aneurysm. Friends said that Eugene hadn't been feeling well in recent weeks and complained of headaches the day before his death.

== Acting ==
In the early 1970s, Eugene was an actor who appeared in such programs as Bewitched (where he played young "Darrin Stephens"), The Screaming Woman (TV Movie), Gidget Gets Married (TV Movie), The Bold Ones and Cannon. Eugene was also a voice actor, lending his voice to several animated series, including Wait Till Your Father Gets Home, The Barkleys and The Amazing Chan and the Chan Clan.

== Music ==
Eugene formed a funk/rock band called Adam Again and become the owner of the Green Room recording studios in Huntington Beach, California. He recorded and produced hundreds of albums at the Green Room, including albums by the Aunt Bettys, The Choir, Daniel Amos, Michael Knott, The Waiting, Crystal Lewis, Jon Gibson, Kosmos Express, Plankeye, Starflyer 59, and others.

In 1987, Eugene, Ojo Taylor and another investor formed Brainstorm Artists International (B.A.I.), which became an important label in the development of the West Coast Christian alternative music scene. Though the record label focused primarily on modern rock artists, B.A.I also released significant contributions from early rap and hip-hop artists such as Dynamic Twins and Freedom of Soul. It was also at this time that Eugene discovered future Myrrh Records artist Anointed and went on to produce their first few albums.

In 1990, Eugene joined the rock band The Swirling Eddies, where he was known as "Prickly Disco". The following year, Eugene, along with Terry Scott Taylor, Derri Daugherty, and Michael Roe, formed the alt-country supergroup Lost Dogs. He also produced for soul/R&B musician Jon Gibson on the album Love Education.

== Various production/recording credits ==
- Wild Blue Yonder, Wild Blue Yonder, 1986, Remixing
- Sacrifice, 441, Broken Records 1988, producer, engineer, Mixing, Arrangement ideas, Vocals
- Everything Is Now, The Holidays, 1988, producer
- Outdoor Elvis, The Swirling Eddies, 1989, Mixing, engineer, Vocals, Guitars and Keyboards
- World Theatre, World Theatre, 1989, producer, Mixing
- Back from Euphoria, The Reign, 1989, producer, Guitar, Mixing
- Pain, Veil of Ashes, 1989, producer, engineer, Piano
- Live Bootleg '82, Daniel Amos, 1990, Final Mix Engineer
- Wonderama, Randy Stonehill, 1991, Executive Producer
- Human Condition, Human Condition, Image Records 1991, Producer++
- Kalhöun, Daniel Amos, 1992, engineer
- MotorCycle, Daniel Amos, 1993, Piano & Engineer
- Stories, Randy Stonehill, 1993, Recorded by Gene Eugene
- Forum, Undercover, 1994, engineer, Mixing, Executive Producer
- Drowning with Land in Sight, The 77s, 1994, Executive Producer
- BibleLand, Daniel Amos, 1994, Piano, Mixing, engineer, Executive Producer
- Eve, Over the Rhine, 1994, various recording and mixing
- Zoom Daddy, The Swirling Eddies, 1994, Mixing, engineer, Guitar, Vocals and Keyboards
- Tom Tom Blues, The 77s, 1995, Executive Producer
- Songs of the Heart, Daniel Amos, 1995, Keyboards, Mixing, engineer, Executive Producer
- Sacred Cows, The Swirling Eddies, 1996, Mixing, engineer, Guitars, Vocals and Keyboards
- Aunt Bettys, Aunt Bettys, 1996, producer, engineer
- Missile Toe, Pspazz, 1996, producer, engineer, Mixing
- Americana, Starflyer 59, 1997, producer, vibraphone, organ
- The Fashion Focus, Starflyer 59, 1998, producer, keyboards, bass guitar
- John Wayne, Terry Scott Taylor, 1998, Mixing, Keyboards
- Simulcast, Kosmos Express, 1998, producer
- Surfonic Water Revival, various artists, 1998, Mixing, recording, piano, Arp Synthesizer
- Attack of the Screamin' Rays, The Screamin' Rays, 1999, keyboards
- Relocation , Plankeye, 1999, producer, engineer, piano, keyboards.
- Everybody Makes Mistakes, Starflyer 59, 1999, producer, keyboards
- Cush, Cush, 2000
- Green Room Blues, The Deluxtone Rockets, 2001
- When Worlds Collide: A Tribute to Daniel Amos, Various Artists, 2000, engineer
- Imaginarium: Songs from the Neverhood, Terry Scott Taylor, 2002/2004, Recording and Mixing, Bass, Keyboards, WahWah, Percussion

== Influence and tributes ==
- In July 2000, several artists joined together with Eugene's old band Adam Again, to pay tribute to the artist at the Cornerstone Festival in Bushnell, Illinois. Performers including The Choir's Derri Daugherty and Steve Hindalong, The 77s' Michael Roe, Mike Knott, Riki Michele and others performed over two hours of Eugene's music. The show was recorded and released as a 2-CD set the following year.
- Also in 2000, The Choir recorded "Hey Gene," a song written about their friend, for their Flap Your Wings album.
- In 2001, Daniel Amos released their two-CD album, Mr. Buechner's Dream, which included a song written about Eugene entitled "Flash in Your Eyes."
- Also in 2001, Northern Records released a tribute album called A Live Tribute Recording For Gene Eugene, which featured artists like Starflyer 59, D.A.S., The Violet Burning, Undercover, Michael Knott, Steve Hindalong, Altar Boys and The Prayer Chain.
- Additionally in 2001, Hip-Hop artist Peace 586 dedicated his album 586 to Gene Eugene, with the song "You Here", featuring Sup the Chemist, as a tribute. Peace 586 considered Mr. Eugene a great friend and mentor.
- In 2002, the rock band Jars of Clay recorded one of Eugene's songs, entitled "Dig", for their Furthermore – From The Studio: From The Stage album (included on their 2007 Sony 2CD-release The Essential Jars of Clay as well),
- Also, in 2002, singer-songwriter and session-musician Richard Swift (Starflyer 59) recorded Eugene's song "Jimmy" for his 7" entitled Buildings in America. "Jimmy" was originally featured at Lost Dogs second album Little Red Riding Hood.
- "Jimmy" was also recorded by Jesse Sprinkle (Poor Old Lu) on his 2006 solo release The Corner of an Unlit World (Blind Record).
- In 2004, for the 20th anniversary of the Cornerstone Festival, a DVD was released entitled 20 Years and Counting, which includes a tribute to several artists that regularly performed at Cornerstone and had recently died, including Eugene, Mark Heard, Vince Ebo and Rich Mullins.
- In 2005, Daniel Amos released their DVD documentary, The Making of Mr. Buechner's Dream. The video, shot mostly in Eugene's Green Room studio during the recording of the band's Mr. Buechner's Dream CD, includes a tribute to the late friend and engineer. Archive footage of Eugene in the studio is also shown.
- In 2007, Daniel Amos released a second documentary DVD chronicling the band's history entitled Instruction Through Film. At one point in the film, during the band's time with Brainstorm Artists International, a short clip of Eugene mixing a Riki Michele song in at the Green Room is seen.
