= Surfonic Water Revival =

Compilation album by Various Artists
- Released: mid-1998
- Genre: Surf music
- Label: KMG
- Producer: Terry Scott Taylor

Professional ratings
Review scores
Source	Rating
CCM Magazine	
HM Magazine	(positive)
The Phantom Tollbooth	4.5/5

Surfonic Water Revival is a various artists compilation album which was recorded and released in 1998 by KMG Records. The album pays tribute to the pioneers of Surf music like Brian Wilson, Jan and Dean, the Belairs, the Hondells, the Surfaris, the Ventures, Beach Boys, Dick Dale and many others.

The album was produced by Terry Scott Taylor who also wrote the majority of the songs which were all recorded exclusively for this album. Nearly every track on the album teams up multiple artists or bands who then join forces to deliver their best tribute to the genre. In some cases, the artists attempt to mix other styles of music with surf music, such as The Insyderz on "A Good Sailor Knows," where the artists attempt to blend their own style of Ska music with Surf, or Skillet on "Last Day Of Summer," where they combine their classic industrial rock sound with Surf. The overall result, according to CCM Magazine, was a sound more like a "unified record" than a compilation.

In 1999 the album was nominated for the Dove Award in the "Special Event Album of the Year" category.

The album was dedicated to Carl Wilson.

== Track listing, composers and artists ==
1. "Wave Perfect" (Taylor) – Smalltown Poets with Paul Johnson
2. "California Blue" (Taylor) – Brother's Keeper with Phil Keaggy
3. "A Good Sailor Knows" (Taylor) – The Insyderz
4. "Endless Summer (Part 2)" (Taylor) – Chuck Girard with Paul Johnson
5. "Surfer Girl Replies" (Taylor) – Plumb
6. "Into the Deep" (Taylor) – Terry Scott Taylor (dedicated to Kerry Livgren)
7. "Thrill Seeker" (Taylor) – Plankeye
8. "The Sun Comes Down Again" (Taylor) – Randy Stonehill with Havalina Rail Co.
9. "Pay For Surf" (Taylor) – Daniel Amos
10. "Gold Coast" (Altizer/Liles/Krippayne/Siler) – Rebecca St. James
11. "Sister Mariana Trench" (Taylor) – Silage
12. "Surfer's Paradise" (Taylor) – All Star United with Phil Keaggy
13. "Oyster" (Altizer/Liles) – Rick Altizer
14. "Last Day of Summer" (Altizer/Liles) – Skillet
15. "Caught Inside" (Morginsky/Terusa/Carson) – The O.C. Supertones
16. "The Net" (taylor) – Lost Dogs with Rich Young Ruler
17. "Wave Perfect (Instrumental)" – Paul Johnson on lead guitar

== Personnel ==
- Andy Prickett: Guitars
- Dave Raven: Drums
- Tim Chandler: Bass Guitar
- Terry Scott Taylor: Guitars
- Steve Hindalong: Percussion
- Phil Madeira: Keyboards
- Ballum Rosedryol: Keyboards

== Additional musicians ==
- Paul Johnson: Guitars on "Endless Summer (Part 2)" and "Wave Perfect"
- Phil Keaggy: Guitars on "Surfer's Paradise" and "California Blue"
- Jerry Chamberlain: Guitars on "Pay For Surf"
- Ed McTaggart: Drums on "Pay For Surf" and "Into The Deep"
- Mike Roe: Background Vocals and Guitars on "Surfer Girl Replies"
- Gene Eugene: Piano, Arp Synthesizer on "Into The Deep," Farfisa on "Pay For Surf."
- Rick Altizer: Guitars and Percussion on "Gold Coast." All instruments and vocals on "Oyster."
- James Gregory: Bass Guitar on "Gold Coast."
- Raymond Boyd: Drums on "Gold Coast."
- Background vocals provided by: Terry Taylor, Frank Drennen, Wayne Everett, Rob Bender, and Mead Chesebro.

== Production notes ==
- Produced by Terry Scott Taylor
- Executive Producer: Kent Songer
- Co-Executive Producer: David Bahnsen
- Recorded at The "Fabulous" Green Room in Huntington Beach, California, Frontpage Recorders in Glendale, Arizona, and "The Mission" in Nashville, Tennessee
- Recorded by Terry Taylor, Gene Eugene and Phil Madeira.
- Mixed by Terry Taylor and Gene Eugene.

=== Additional production notes ===
- "Gold Coast" produced by Rick Altizer and Tedd T.
  - recorded at Papa Goose Studios, Antenna Studios, Brentwood, Tennessee
  - mixed by Julian Kindred.
- "California Blue" recorded at Ardent Studios, Memphis, Tennessee.
  - Engineered by Pete Matthews.
  - Vocals produced by Kevin Paige.
- "Wave Perfect" Vocals and overdubs recorded at Twelve Oaks Recording studios and Soundstage, Sayrna, California.
  - Engineered by Randy Bugg.
  - Vocals produced by Michael Gleason.
- "Last Day of Summer" produced by Skidd Mills and Skillet.
  - recorded at Ardent Studios, Memphis, Tennessee.
  - engineered by Skidd Mills
  - assistant engineer: Brad Blackwood
- "Oyster" recorded and mixed at Papa Goose Studios, Nashville, Tennessee.
  - Engineered and produced by Rick Altizer.
- "Caught Inside" recorded at West Beach Studios, Hollywood, California.
  - Produced by Steve Kravac.
  - Mixed at A&M Studios.
