= Salvation Air Force =

Salvation Air Force is known as Canada's first Christian rock band. It was formed in 1972 by Donnie Gossett and later joined by his brother, Michael Leon Gossett. The band toured across Western Canada and the Western United States and recorded four albums. The first was released on the then largest Christian record label, Myrrh Records, and the subsequent three were independent releases. The band was signed by Larry Norman to his Solid Rock Records label in 1977, who produced a version of his own composition, "If God Is My Father" with SAF. However, the band's first album presented a mellow version of their music, which led to the group disbanding in 1980. The band briefly reformed in 2004–2006 for a few concerts and two more albums.

== Bibliography ==
- Encyclopedia of Contemporary Christian Music. Boston: Hendrickson, 2002 Page 788, ISBN 978-1565636798
