= Doppelgänger (Daniel Amos album) =

Studio album by Daniel Amos
- Released: 1983
- Recorded: Whitefield Studios, (Santa Ana, California)
- Genres: New Wave, Christian alternative rock
- Label: Alarma!
- Producers: Terry Scott Taylor, Jerry Chamberlain

Daniel Amos chronology
¡Alarma! (1981)	Doppelgänger (1983)	Vox Humana (1984)

Professional ratings
Review scores
Source	Rating
Allmusic	4/5 stars
Harvest Rock Syndicate	5/5 stars

Doppelgänger is the fifth studio album by Christian alternative rock band Daniel Amos issued on their own Alarma! Records label in 1983. It is the second album in their ¡Alarma! Chronicles album cycle.

== Content ==
Doppelgänger is much darker than the album that preceded it, ¡Alarma!. The album starts with the eerie backward sounds of "Hollow Man" (inspired by T. S. Eliot's poem, The Hollow Men). Taylor's lyrics to "I Didn't Build it For Me", "Autographs for the Sick", and "New Car" were sharp attacks on televangelists, anticipating the Jimmy Swaggart/Jim Bakker/Robert Tilton scandals of 1987–88.

Doppelgänger is the second of a four-part series of albums by DA entitled The ¡Alarma! Chronicles, which also includes ¡Alarma!, Vox Humana and Fearful Symmetry. In the tour that followed the release, the band presented a full multimedia event, complete with video screens synchronized to the music, something that was unusual in the early 1980s for any Christian band. The stage presentation even prompted heckling at some shows.

This album, along with the other three albums from the Alarma! Chronicles, was rereleased as part of the Alarma! Chronicles book-set in 2000. The book set included three CDs, over 200 pages of lyrics, photos, liner notes, essays, interviews and other information in a hardcover book.

== Reissue ==
In 2014, Born Twice Records revisited the album as part of its ongoing deluxe reissue series re-issued the album as a two-CD.

== Track listing ==
=== Side one ===
1. "Hollow Man" (Taylor) (2:46)
2. "Mall (All Over the World)" (Taylor) (3:17)
3. "Real Girls" (Taylor, Chamberlain) (3:01)
4. "New Car!" (Taylor) (2:01)
5. "Do Big Boys Cry" (Taylor) (2:07)
6. "Youth With a Machine" (Taylor) (2:45)
7. "The Double" (Taylor) (3:56)

=== Side two ===
1. "Distance and Direction" (Taylor) (2:55)
2. "Memory Lane" (Taylor) (3:51)
3. "Angels Tuck You In" (Taylor) (2:45)
4. "Little Crosses" (Chamberlain) (2:40)
5. "Autographs for the Sick" (words by Taylor, music by Taylor, Chamberlain, Chandler) (1:42)
6. "I Didn't Build It for Me" (words by Taylor, music by Taylor, Chamberlain) (2:50)
7. "Here I Am" (Taylor) (3:16)
8. "Hollow Man (Reprise)" (Taylor) (0:53)

=== Deluxe edition bonus disc ===
1. "Hollow Man" [Alternate]
2. "Mall (All Over the World)" [Alternate]
3. Concert Intro
4. "Real Girls" [Live]
5. "New Car!" [Live]
6. "Do Big Boys Cry" [Instrumental]
7. "Youth with a Machine" [Toy Mix]
8. "The Double" [Extended Rough]
9. "Distance and Direction" [Alternate]
10. "Distance and Direction" [Vocal Mix]
11. "Memory Lane" [Live]
12. "Angels Tuck You In" [Rough]
13. "Little Crosses" [Fragment]
14. "Autographs for the Sick" [Alternate]
15. "I Didn’t Build It For Me" [Alternate]
16. "Here I Am" [Instrumental]
17. "Hollow Man" (Reprise) [Alternate]

== Personnel ==
- Jerry Chamberlain – lead guitars, background vocals, lead vocal on "Little Crosses", spoken lead vocal on "Autographs For The Sick", percussion
- Tim Chandler – bass guitar, background vocals, percussion
- Ed McTaggart – drums, background vocals, percussion
- Terry Scott Taylor – rhythm guitars, lead vocals

Additional musicians

- Tom Howard – keyboards, background vocals
- Mark Cook – keyboards, background vocals
- Marty Dieckmeyer – keyboards, bass
- Jeff Lams – keyboards
- Rob Watson – keyboards
- Bill Colton – saxophone
- Alex MacDougall – percussion
- Randy Stonehill – background vocals
- Derri Daugherty – background vocals
- Janet McTaggart – background vocals
- Dori Howard – background vocals
- The Three Women from Istanbul – background vocals
- Emilia Emulator – background vocals

Production notes

- Thom Roy – engineering
- Derri Daugherty – second engineer
- Recorded and mixed at Whitefield Studios, Santa Ana, California
- Steve Hall - mastering (at MCA Whitney)
- Rehearsals and arrangements recorded at the Rebel Base, Santa Ana
- Derrill Bazzy – art direction, photography, album art concepts
- Bonnie Ferguson – photography
- Terry Taylor – album art concepts
- Phillip Mangano – album art concepts
- Keyboards arranged by Taylor/Chamberlain/Howard
- Tom Gulotta – project coordinator
- Eric Townsend – alternate bonus mixes
- Re-mastered by J Powell at Steinhaus
