= Welcome to Paradise (disambiguation) =

"Welcome to Paradise" is a 1994 song by Green Day.

Welcome to Paradise may also refer to:

== Film and television ==
- "Welcome to Paradise" (Airwolf), a 1987 television episode
- "Welcome to Paradise" (The Vampire Diaries), a 2014 television episode
- Welcome to Paradise, a 2007 film starring Crystal Bernard

== Music ==
- Welcome to Paradise (album), by Randy Stonehill, 1976
- Welcome to Paradise, an album by NorthTale, 2019
- "Welcome to Paradise", a song by Grandson from the album Death of an Optimist, 2020
- "Welcome to Paradise", a song by John Waite from the album Mask of Smiles, 1985
- "Welcome to Paradise", a song by Plain White T's from the original motion picture soundtrack of Curious George 3: Back to the Jungle (2015)
- "Welcome to Paradise", a song by Front 242 from the album Front by Front, 1988
- Welcome to Paradise, a 2012 concert tour by Cody Simpson

== Radio and Podcasts ==
- Welcome to Paradise, a 2022 CBC Radio podcast by Anna Maria Tremonti
