= Stunt Records =

American record label

- Founded: 1990
- Founder: Terry Scott Taylor; Tom Gulotta
- Distributor: Galaxy21 Music
- Genre: Various
- Country of origin: United States
- Official website: www.danielamos.com/stunt/

Stunt Records is an independent record label formed in 1990 by Daniel Amos, Terry Scott Taylor, and Tom Gulotta.

This is different from the Stunt Records which is a jazz record label in Denmark.

== Discography ==
1. The Swirling Eddies – Swirling Mellow
2. Daniel Amos – Live Bootleg '82, (1990)
3. Daniel Amos – ¡Alarma! (CD reissue w/3 bonus tracks), (1991)
4. Daniel Amos – Doppelgänger (CD reissue w/3 bonus tracks), (1992)
5. Various Artists – No Sense of History, (1992) with Alternative Records
6. Various Artists – Shirley, Goodness & Misery, (1992) with Alternative Records
7. Daniel Amos – Motor Cycle Tracks (CD promo), (1993)
8. Terry Scott Taylor – Knowledge & Innocence (collector's edition signed & numbered by Terry), (1993)
9. Daniel Amos – Preachers From Outer Space, (1995)
10. Loam – Stereoscopic, (1996)
11. Terry Scott Taylor – Ten–Gallon Hat Six–song E.P., (1997)
12. Eve Selis – Out On a Wire, (1998)
13. Eve Selis – Into the Sun, (1999)
14. Eve Selis – Long Road Home, (2000)
15. Terry Scott Taylor – Imaginarium, (2000)
16. Daniel Amos – The Alarma! Chronicles Book Set, (2000)
17. Daniel Amos – Mr. Buechner's Dream, with Galaxy21 Music, 2001
18. Daniel Amos – When Everyone Wore Hats, (2002)
19. Terry Scott Taylor – LITTLE, big, (2002)
20. Dr. Edward Daniel Taylor – The Prickly Heat Radio Players, 2004
21. Dr. Edward Daniel Taylor – The Perfectly Frank, True Story of Christmas
22. Terry Scott Taylor – Imaginarium: Songs from the Neverhood, (2005)
23. Daniel Amos – Daniel Amos 30th Anniversary Deluxe Reissue (2006)
24. The Swirling Eddies – The midget, the speck and the molecule (2007)
25. Daniel Amos – Darn Floor – Big Bite 20th Anniversary Edition
26. The Lost Dogs – Old Angel (2010)
27. Terry Scott Taylor – Swine Before Pearl, Standard & Deluxe Editions (2010)
28. Terry Scott Taylor – Swine Before Pearl, Volume 2, (2011)
29. Daniel Amos – Daniel Amos Collector's Edition (rerelease of 30th Anniversary edition, 2011)
30. Daniel Amos – Shotgun Angel Collector's Edition (2 CD Deluxe Reissue, 2011)
31. Daniel Amos – Mr. Buechner's Dream (Reissue with bonus track, 2011)
32. Daniel Amos – Tour 2011 (Tour compilation, 2011)
33. Terry Scott Taylor – Return to the Neverhood (Comic Book & CD, 2012)
34. Daniel Amos – Dig Here Said the Angel (CD, 2012)

== Videography ==
1. Daniel Amos - Live in Anaheim 1985, DVD (2004)
2. Daniel Amos - The Making of Mr. Buechner's Dream DVD, (2005)
3. Daniel Amos - Instruction Through Film, DVD (2007)

== See also ==
- List of record labels
