= When Worlds Collide: A Tribute to Daniel Amos =

Recording by Various artists
- Released: July 2000
- Recorded: July 1999 – May 2000
- Genre: Indie
- Label: Ferris Wheel
- Producer: Eric Townsend, Jason Townsend

When Worlds Collide: A Tribute to Daniel Amos is an indie tribute album by a variety of artists that pays musical tribute to the band Daniel Amos and its chief songwriter Terry Scott Taylor. It was released in July 2000 by Ferris Wheel.

This project was entirely a labor of love from the artists that participated. Most of them completely donated their time and work to the project. The majority of the profits were donated to Compassion International.

Animator and musician Doug TenNapel created the unique album artwork and also contributed a musical track with his band Truck. The album includes longtime friends of Daniel Amos, like Randy Stonehill, Jimmy Abegg, The 77s and Starflyer 59 and a few surprises including a song by Larry Norman, who had not worked with the band in any form since their strained relationship following the delays of the band's Horrendous Disc album in the late 1970s. Longtime friends of DA's (and Taylor's fellow Lost Dogs) Gene Eugene of Adam Again, and Derri Daugherty and Steve Hindalong of The Choir perform supporting roles on various songs.

== Track listing ==
- All tracks written by Terry Scott Taylor, except where noted.
1. "I Love You #19" (performed by Rick Altizer)
2. "William Blake" (performed by Erin Echo with Bobby Mittan of The Ocean Blue)
3. "Shotgun Angel" (performed by The 77's)
4. "Alarma!" (performed by Phil Madeira)
5. "Stone Away" (performed by Robert Hereindt)
6. "Shedding The Mortal Coil" (performed by Starflyer 59)
7. "Hell Oh" (performed by Jeff Elbel and Ping)
8. "Strange Animals" (performed by Street Angel)
9. "Beautiful One" (performed by Randy Stonehill)
10. "The Pool" (performed by JAP)
11. "Hold Back The Wind, Donna" (performed by Sideways8)
12. "Blowing Smoke" (performed by Jimmy A)
13. "Through The Speakers" (performed by Dead Artist Syndrome)
14. "Real Girls" (performed by Joy Gewalt)
15. "Incredible Shrinking Man" (performed by Truck)
16. "Hound of Heaven" (performed by Larry Norman)
17. "It's The 80's" (performed by Poole)
18. "(Out of) the Wild Wood" (performed by The Throes)
