= Mike D. Stone =

- Born: October 24, 1949
- Died: December 3, 2017 (aged 68)
- Occupations: Audio engineer, record producer

Mike D. Stone (October 24, 1949 – December 3, 2017) was an American recording engineer and record producer. Stone worked with Frank Zappa (multiple albums), Joe Walsh, B. B. King, Bee Gees, America, Peter Criss, Paul Stanley, and others.

== Biography ==
Stone began his career as a recording engineer at the Record Plant recording studio in California in 1969. His uncle, Chris Stone, co-owned the Record Plant with Gary Kellgren. From 1981 on, Stone was an independent audio engineer for MDS Audio. From 1985 through 1988, he was the chief engineer at the Record Plant branch in Los Angeles and then worked as music mixer at Lorimar-Columbia-Sony Studios from 1989 until 1993.

== Selected discography (incomplete) ==
- 1970 B. B. King – Indianola Mississippi Seeds, engineer
- 1970 James Gang – James Gang Rides Again, engineer
- 1971 Dory Previn – Mythical Kings and Iguanas, engineer
- 1972 America – Homecoming, engineer
- 1973 Joe Walsh – The Smoker You Drink, the Player You Get, engineer
- 1973 Buddy Miles – Chapter VII, engineer
- 1973 Bee Gees – Life in a Tin Can, engineer
- 1972 America – Hat Trick, engineer
- 1974 Frank Zappa – One Size Fits All, engineer
- 1974 Frank Zappa – Studio Tan, engineer
- 1978 Peter Criss – Peter Criss, engineer
- 1978 Paul Stanley – Paul Stanley, engineer
- 1980 Daniel Amos – Horrendous Disc, producer, engineer
- 1987 The Textones – Cedar Creek, producer, engineer
- 1998 Barbra Streisand – Funny Lady, engineer

== Note ==
The audio engineering references for Mike D. Stone of the Record Plant recording studio in Los Angeles, California, often get confused and mixed with the references of Mike Stone (record producer) of the United Kingdom who worked at Trident Studios and Abbey Road Studios, and engineered for Queen, Genesis and Asia. And their references sometimes are confused with Mike "Clay" Stone of Clay Records, who worked with largely U.K. punk and metal acts.

== See also ==
- List of engineers
- List of people from Los Angeles
- List of record producers
