= Welcome to Paradise (album) =

Studio album by Randy Stonehill
- Released: 1976
- Studio: Solid Rock Recording Studios; Mama Jo's; Sunset Sound
- Genre: Christian rock, rock
- Label: Solid Rock
- Producer: Larry Norman

Randy Stonehill chronology
Get Me Out of Hollywood (1973)	Welcome to Paradise (1976)	The Sky is Falling (1980)

Professional ratings
Review scores
Source	Rating
AllMusic	5/5 stars

Welcome to Paradise is an album by Randy Stonehill, released in 1976, on Solid Rock Records. The album was produced by Larry Norman, with Andy Johns doing the engineering. Stonehill, with producer Mark Heard, titled his 1989 album, Return to Paradise, a reference to the title of this record.

This album was listed at No. 13 in the 2001 book, CCM Presents: The 100 Greatest Albums in Christian Music. The album includes a rerecording of "Puppet Strings" from Get Me Out of Hollywood.

== Track listing ==
All songs written by Randy Stonehill. Side One: Paradise Lost (sorrow and sadness....)

1. "King of Hearts" – 4:53
2. "Keep Me Runnin'" – 5:57
3. "The Winner (High Card)" – 3:43
4. "Lung Cancer" – 3:31
5. "Puppet Strings" – 4:25

Side Two: Paradise Regained (....turn into gladness)

1. "First Prayer" – 3:08
2. "I've Got News for You" – 3:49
3. "Song for Sarah" – 3:28
4. "Christmas Song for All Year 'Round" – 3:56
5. "Good News" – 3:18

== Personnel ==
- Randy Stonehill – vocals, acoustic guitars
- Larry Norman – pianos, electric guitars, harmony vocals
- Jon Linn – lead guitars
- Tim Ayers (The Mighty T-Bone) – bass guitar
- Mark Walker – drums
- Anthony Harris – charts and baton

Production notes

- Produced and Arranged by Larry Norman, a Solid Rock Studios Production.
- Engineered by Andy Johns
- Co-Engineered by Tom Trefethen
- Pre-Production recording at Solid Rock Recording Studios, 16trk/24trk at Mama Jo's and Sunset Sound.
- Mastered at Artisan Sound Recorders
- Larry Norman – photography and album design
- Joe Taylor – lettering
