= Walk on Water (band) =

Walk On Water
- Origin: Sweden
- Genres: CCM, rock pop
- Years active: 1990–2006
- Labels: Alarma Records

Walk on Water was a Christian music band in Sweden who won a national competition with the video for "What's the Noise?", a song on their first album. The music video was directed by Jonas Åkerlund.
