= Alarma Records =

US record label

- Parent company: Newpax, Frontline
- Founded: 1983
- Founder: Daniel Amos, Tom Howard
- Distributor: Frontline Records
- Genre: Alternative Christian music, various
- Country of origin: United States

Alarma Records was an imprint of Newpax Records and Frontline Records. Alarma! Records and Tapes was formed in 1983 by the band Daniel Amos with musician Tom Howard for the release of their Doppelgänger album. The name of the label comes from the band's 1981 album ¡Alarma!.

It was reformed by the Frontline Music Group in the late 1980s.

== Artists ==
- afewloosescrews
- Altar Boys
- Daniel Amos
- Dead Artist Syndrome
- Dr. Edward Daniel Taylor
- Edin-Ådahl
- Rick Elias
- Every Day Life
- Hoglund Band
- Jacob's Trouble
- Lifesavers
- Mad at the World
- Michael Knott
- Mortal
- Poor Old Lu
- Scaterd Few
- Shades of Blue
- The Swirling Eddies
- Terry Scott Taylor
- White Frogs
- Walk on Water
- David Zaffiro

== See also ==
- Intense Records
- List of record labels
