= Daniel Amos (album) =

Studio album by Daniel Amos
- Released: 1976
- Recorded: December 1975
- Studio: Mama Jo's, Hollywood; Independent Recorders, Hollywood
- Genre: Country rock, folk rock, Jesus music
- Label: Maranatha!
- Producer: Daniel Amos, Al Perkins

Daniel Amos chronology
Daniel Amos (1976)	Shotgun Angel (1977)

Professional ratings
Review scores
Source	Rating
AllMusic	3/5 stars

Daniel Amos is the self-titled debut album by Christian rock band Daniel Amos. The album was issued in 1976 by Maranatha! Music and was produced by Al Perkins. It is typical of the country rock sound the band performed in the mid-1970s before their switch to alternative rock in the early 1980s.

== Background ==
Heavily influenced by the Band, Steely Dan and the Byrds' Sweetheart of the Rodeo, Daniel Amos' debut full-length album temporarily leaves behind the rock roots of the band members earlier bands although many of the songs came from those days. Baxter's "The Bible" and "Love in a Yielded Heart" (then known as "Freedom") were both performed in the early days of Jubal's Last Band, the band that was formed in late 1972 and eventually evolved into Daniel Amos. Taylor's "William", "Dusty Road," and "Ain't Gonna Fight It" date back to 1971 and his early band Good Shephard, and "Skeptic's Song" (then known as "Resurrection") dates back at least to 1972 and his band, Judge Rainbow and the Prophetic Trumpets.

The band's recording contract with Maranatha! resulted from Jubal's Last Band's audition for the label sometime in mid-1975. Another band at the meeting, led by Darrell Mansfield, had a similar name - Jubal. The two bands decided to change their names to avoid confusion. Mansfield renamed his band Gentle Faith, and Jubal's Last Band became Daniel Amos. Not long after, D.A. recorded its first song for Maranatha!, Taylor's "'Aint Gonna Fight It." That track was released on the Various Artists album, Maranatha! 5 towards the end of that same year. That December, D.A. entered Mama Jo's Studio and began work on their first album. The album was released in early 1976.

== Reissue ==
In 2004, work began on a special 30th Anniversary Deluxe two-disc version of the album. The collection, released on June 26, 2006, includes the full newly remastered album, never before seen photos, bonus material, interviews and more. The second disc traced the band's evolution from various bands in the early 1970s to the formation of Daniel Amos in 1975. Also included for those who pre-ordered the collection was third disc of bonus material similar to the second. This edition was repackaged and re-released in 2011 on Born Twice Records with expanded artwork and a larger booklet.

== Track listing ==
Disc one: The Remastered Album

1. "Jesus Is Jehovah To Me" (Chamberlain, Dieckmeyer, Taylor) – 3:18
2. "The Bible" (Baxter) – 4:20
3. "Abidin'" (Taylor) – 3:24
4. "William" (Taylor) – 2:52
5. "Prelude: Servant's Prayer" (Baxter) :47
6. "Don't Light Your Own Fire" (Taylor) – 4:28
7. "Losers And Winners" (Taylor) – 3:52
8. "Walking On The Water" (Taylor) – 4:38
9. "Ridin' Along" (Baxter, Chamberlain, Dieckmeyer, Taylor) – 2:10
10. "Dusty Road" (Taylor) – 3:25
11. "Love In A Yielded Heart" (Baxter) – 2:34
12. "Skeptics' Song" (Taylor) – 2:22
13. "Happily Married Man" (Bonus track from Maranatha Country Roundup) – 3:09
14. "Ain't Gonna Fight It" (Bonus track from Maranatha! 5) – 4:27

Disc two: bonus material

1. "Don't Light Your Own Fire" (live) 1977, Daniel Amos – 4:11
2. "Walking on the Water" (live) 1977, Daniel Amos – 4:47
3. Interview Segment: "Katy" – 3:15
4. "Calvary Road" (demo) 1971, Terry solo – 3:09
5. "New Life" (demo) 1972, Judge Rainbow & the Prophetic Trumpets – 3:20
6. Interview Segment: "Cardboard Scheme/Scarlet Staircase/Down Home" – 3:37
7. "Walkin With My Lord" (demo) 1971, Terry with wife Debi – 2:27
8. "Knock Knock" (demo) 1972, Terry solo :58
9. "Heavenly Home" (demo) 1972, Judge Rainbow & the Prophetic Trumpets – 2:11
10. "Love Sings A Song In My Heart" (demo) 1971, Terry solo – 1:50
11. "Jesus Saved My Soul" (demo) 1971, Good Shepherd – 3:45
12. Interview Segment: "Expressing faith in music" – 3:35
13. "Aint Gonna Fight It" (demo) 1973, Jubal's Last Band – 3:54
14. Interview Segment: "The Lost Dogs record Ain't Gonna Fight It" – 1:06
15. Interview Segment: "The Move/Jubal’s Last Band" – 1:56
16. "Love Has Open Arms" (demo) 1972, Terry and Debi with Judge Rainbow – 3:40
17. "Resurrection" ("Skeptics Song" demo) 1972, Judge Rainbow & the Prophetic Trumpets – 2:18
18. "Meal" (demo) 1972, Terry solo – 2:36
19. Interview Segment: "The Name Daniel Amos" – 3:37
20. "Dear Captain/The Bible" (demo) 1973, Jubal's Last Band – 5:51
21. "William" (demo) 1972, Judge Rainbow & the Prophetic Trumpets – 2:38
22. Interview Segment: "Al Perkins" – 3:26
23. "Freedom" ("Love In A Yielded Heart" demo) 1973, Steve Baxter and Jubal's Last Band – 3:40
24. "For Me To Live Is Christ" (demo) 1972, Terry and Debi – 2:49
25. "Jesus Is Still Crying For The World" (demo) 1971 Terry solo – 1:55
26. "In Everything Give Him Thanks" (live) 1975, Daniel Amos – 2:59

All Songs 2006 ASCAP/Zoom Daddy music.

Disc three: additional bonus material

1. "Wanna Be Ready" (demo) 1972, Terry solo – 2:19
2. "He Touched Me" (demo) 1972, Terry solo
3. "Walking On the Water" (demo) 1972, Judge Rainbow & The Prophetic Trumpets
4. Interview Segment: "On Bonus Tracks, the Lost Dogs & the Beatles"
5. "Love Won't Wait Forever" (demo) 1972, Terry solo
6. Interview Segment: "Early Bands"
7. "Glory Road" (demo) 1971, Terry solo
8. "The Bible" (demo) 1974, Jubal's Last Band
9. "Light of the World" (demo) 1974, Jubal's Last Band
10. Interview Segment: "The Other Guys In the Band"
11. "You Can't Go Around the Cross" (live) 1976, Daniel Amos
12. "Nicodemus" (live) 1976, Daniel Amos
13. "Meal" (live) 1976, Daniel Amos
14. "Holy Rollin Again" (live) 1976, Daniel Amos
15. Interview Segment: "First Guitar"
16. "Losers and Winners" (live) May 10, 1974, Jubal's Last Band
17. "Takes A Heart Ache" (live) May 10, 1974, Jubal's Last Band
18. "Ridin Along" (live) 1976, Daniel Amos
19. "Dusty Road" (live) 1976, Daniel Amos
20. "Farther Along" (live) 1976, Daniel Amos

== Personnel ==
Daniel Amos

- Steve Baxter – 6-string steel-string acoustic guitar, harmonica, Jew's harp, whistle, lead vocal on "The Bible", "A Servant's Prayer", "Ridin' Along" and "Love in a Yielded Heart", master of ceremonies for "Skeptic's Song"
- Jerry Chamberlain – electric lead guitar, background vocals, co-lead vocal on "Jesus Is Jehovah to Me"
- Marty Dieckmeyer – bass guitar
- Terry Taylor – 6 and 12-string guitars, harmonica, lead vocals on remaining tracks

Additional musicians

- Dave Angel – sax solo, clarinet
- Mike "Pooh Bear" Baird – drums
- Jonathan David Brown – harpsichord, organ
- Brian Carroll – nylon string lead and rhythm guitar
- Dave Diggs – piano, horn arrangement
- Joann Grauer – Fender Rhodes
- Alex MacDougall – percussion
- Al Perkins – pedal steel guitar, banjo
- Jerry Waller – piano
- John Ware – drums, "Hoo-Doo Meat Box"
- Bob Warford – pull-string guitar, 6-string acoustic guitar
- John Wickham – bell monitor
- Dan Amos – other percussive embellishments

Production

- Al Perkins – producer, mixing
- Jonathan David Brown – engineer, mixing
- Mama Jo's, N. Hollywood, California – recording location
- Independent Recorders, Hollywood, California – recording location
- Mama Jo's – mixing location
- Bernie Grundman at A&M – mastering
- Dan Del Isla at DLI Studios – remastering
- Billy Taylor – remix engineer
- Dale G. Waters – illustration
- Hosmer C. McKoon – photography
- Dan Agulian – photography
- MPS Photographic Services, Inc. – photography
- Daniel Amos Archives – photography
- Tom Gulotta – design and layout, interviews
- Jason Townsend – additional design and layout, discs two and three compilation and editing
- Eric Townsend – additional design and layout, discs two and three compilation and editing
- Katy Haselden's living room – recording location for original demos
- Calvary Chapel, Costa Mesa, California – recording location for live tracks
