= ¡Alarma! (album) =

Studio album by Daniel Amos
- Released: April 1981
- Studios: Whitefield Studios, Santa Ana, California
- Genres: New wave, power pop
- Label: NewPax
- Producers: Daniel Amos, Thom Roy

Daniel Amos chronology
Horrendous Disc (1981)	¡Alarma! (1981)	Doppelgänger (1983)

Professional ratings
Review scores
Source	Rating
AllMusic	3/5 stars
CCM Magazine	Rating

¡Alarma! is the fourth studio album by Christian rock band Daniel Amos, issued on Newpax Records in April 1981. It is the first album in their ¡Alarma! Chronicles series and one of the earliest records in the Christian alternative rock genre.

== Background ==
¡Alarma!, released weeks after the band's Beatles- and Beach Boys-influenced Horrendous Disc, took a decidedly new wave direction along the lines of Elvis Costello or Talking Heads.

Lyrically, the album contains social commentary so harsh that CCM described it as "perhaps the most scathing ever put out by a Christian label." Other critics offered the following assessments: "the most exciting release of the year"; "brash, new and intensely creative" and "possibly the most significant album in the genre of Christian rock". ¡Alarma! was the first of a four-part series of albums by DA entitled The ¡Alarma! Chronicles, which also included the albums Doppelgänger, Vox Humana, and Fearful Symmetry. This album, along with the other three albums from the Alarma! Chronicles, was rereleased as part of the Alarma! Chronicles book set in 2000. The book set included three CDs and a hardcover book of lyrics, photos, liner notes, essays, interviews and other information that amounted to over 200 printed pages.

Bass guitarist Marty Dieckmeyer left the band before the ¡Alarma! Tour, and was replaced with bassist Tim Chandler.

This album was listed at No. 62 in the book CCM Presents: The 100 Greatest Albums in Christian Music (Harvest House Publishers, 2001).

== Reissue ==
In 2013, the album was remastered and repackaged as a two-CD deluxe edition by Stunt Records. Tom Gulotta and Eric Townsend were put in charge of compiling the project - bringing together previously unseen photos, never-before-heard out-takes, mixes and demos, and a reading of the first chapter of the Alarma Chronicles by Malcolm Wild.

== Track listing ==
=== Side one ===
1. "Central Theme" (Taylor)
2. "¡Alarma!" (Taylor)
3. "Big Time/Big Deal" (Taylor)
4. "Props" (Taylor)
5. "My Room" (Taylor)
6. "Faces To The Window" (Taylor)
7. "Cloak & Dagger" (Taylor, Chamberlain)
8. "Colored By" (Taylor)

=== Side two ===
1. "C & D Reprise" (Taylor, Chamberlain)
2. "Through The Speakers" (Taylor)
3. "Hit Them" (Taylor)
4. "Baby Game" (Taylor)
5. "Shedding The Mortal Coil" (Taylor, Cook, Chamberlain)
6. "Endless Summer" (Taylor, Chamberlain)
7. "Walls Of Doubt" (Taylor)
8. "Ghost Of The Heart" (Taylor)

=== Deluxe edition bonus disc ===
1. "Little Things" (demo)
2. "Off My Mind" (demo)
3. "As Long As I Live" (demo)
4. "No Spaceship" (demo)
5. "Out Of Town" (demo)
6. "Only One" (demo)
7. "Central Theme" (demo)
8. "My Room" (demo)
9. "Faces To The Window" (demo)
10. "Colored By" (demo)
11. "Through The Speakers" (demo)
12. "Hit Them" (demo)
13. "Endless Summer" (demo)
14. "Walls of Doubt" (demo)
15. "Props" (Vocal mix)
16. "Big Time/Big Deal" (Alternate Mix)
17. "Shedding the Mortal Coil" (Alternate Mix)
18. "Ghost of the Heart" (Alternate Mix)
19. "¡Alarma!" (Instrumental)
20. "Colored By" (Instrumental)
21. "¡Alarma! Reading" by Malcolm Wild

== Personnel ==
=== Musicians ===
- Jerry Chamberlain - lead guitars, backing vocals, percussion on "My Room"
- Marty Dieckmeyer - bass guitar, keyboards, lead vocal on "Props", (Note: Dieckmeyer's lead vocal on "Props" was not a serious one and was credited on the album as "reluctant lead vocal".) percussion on "My Room"
- Ed McTaggart - drums, percussion, backing vocals
- Terry Scott Taylor - rhythm guitars, lead and backing vocals
- Alex MacDougall - congas on "My Room", marimba on "Alarma"
- Karen Benson - female vocal on "Ghost of the Heart"

=== Production ===
- Produced by Daniel Amos and Thom Roy for Rebel Base Productions
- Recorded and Mixed at White Field Studios, Santa Ana, CA
- Engineered by Thom Roy
- Mastered at MCA Whitney by Steve Hall
- Rehearsals and arrangements recorded at Rebel Base Studio, Santa Ana, CA
- Live Sound and Road Coordination: Wes Leathers
- Cover Concept: Daniel Amos
- Cover Photography: Scott Lockwood, Newport Beach, CA
- Other Photos by Alex MacDougall
- Graphic Design: Karen Knecht
- Airbrushing: Stephen Nichol Price
- Re-issue layout: Tom Gulotta and Eric Townsend
- Re-issue produced by Tom Gulotta
- Re-mastered by J Powell at Steinhaus
- ¡Alarma! Chronicles Book Text Written by Terry Taylor, with special thanks to Viann, Phillip, and "Doc" Thomas for your suggestions.
- Thanks to Bob MacKenzie and Pelle Karlsson for the Lifesavors. This album is for Phillip, with our depest love.
- "Little Things", "Off My Mind" and "As Long As I Live" recorded at White Field Studios, 1980. 4-Track Demos recorded at the Rebel Base, 1980. Mixed by Doug Doyle and Terry Taylor at Cap'n Doug's Minute Mix (Digital Brothers), Costa Mesa. California - September 1991 ("arr!")
- ¡Alarma! text read by Malcolm Wild
- Alternate mixes by Eric Townsend
