= The Green Room (recording studio) =

Californian recording studio

The Green Room (a.k.a. The Fabulous Green Room) was a popular recording studio located in Huntington Beach, California, described by Bill Lobdell of the Los Angeles Times as "arguably the center of the Christian rock world" in Orange County. The Green Room was owned and operated by musician Gene Eugene and Brainstorm art director/photographer Anna Cardenas until Eugene's death in 2000.

== History ==
The Green Room was located on the first floor of Eugene's home in Huntington Beach. It served as something of a community center for Christian rock musicians in the area.

The studio had been active since the 1980s; Eugene and Cardenas took over management of The Green Room in 1993, and ran it until Eugene died in his sleep at the studio in March 20. After Eugene's death, longtime collaborator Chris Colbert stepped in to take over Eugene's projects at the studio. Cardenas was later forced to sell the studio in 2002.

Artists who frequently recorded at The Green Room include Eugene's own bands, Adam Again, Lost Dogs (who also named two of their CDs and a song after the studio), and The Swirling Eddies. Others who recorded there include Terry Scott Taylor, as well as his band—Daniel Amos, Poor Old Lu, Starflyer59, Anointed, The Waiting and Randy Stonehill.
