= Larry Norman =

American musician, singer, songwriter and record producer (1947–2008)

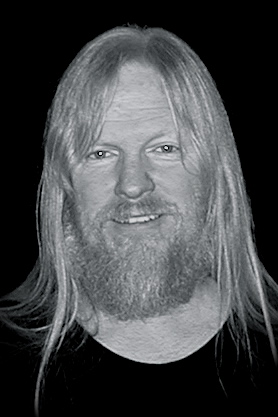
- Norman in Ohio, October 2001

Background information
- Born: Larry David Norman; April 8, 1947; Corpus Christi, Texas, U.S.
- Origin: San Jose, California, U.S.
- Died: February 24, 2008 (aged 60) Salem, Oregon, U.S.
- Genres: Rock; Christian rock; Jesus music
- Years active: 1966–2007
- Labels: Capitol; MGM/Verve; Solid Rock; Phydeaux
- Website: Official website

Larry David Norman (April 8, 1947 – February 24, 2008) was an American musician, singer, songwriter, record label owner, and record producer. He is considered to be one of the pioneers of Christian rock music and released more than 100 albums.

== Early life ==
Larry Norman was born in Corpus Christi, Texas, the oldest son of Joe Hendrex "Joe Billy" Norman, and his wife, Margaret Evelyn "Margiee" Stout. Joe Norman had served as a sergeant in the US Army Air Corps during World War II and worked at the Southern Pacific Railroad while studying to become a teacher. After Norman's birth, the family joined the Southern Baptist church. In 1950 the family moved to San Francisco, where they attended an African American Pentecostal church and then a Baptist church, where Norman became a Christian at the age of five. In 1959, Norman performed on the syndicated television show The Original Amateur Hour.

In 1960, Norman's father began teaching in San Jose, California; the family lived in nearby Campbell. Norman graduated from Campbell High School in 1965 and won an academic scholarship to major in English at San José State University. After one semester, Norman "flunked out of college and lost [his] scholarship."

Although Norman was able to play a variety of musical instruments, he never learned musical notation.

== Career ==
=== Early bands ===
While still in high school, Norman formed a group called The Back Country Seven, which included his sister Nancy Jo and friend Gene Mason. After graduating, Norman continued performing locally.

In 1966 Norman opened a concert for People! at the Asilomar Conference Grounds in Pacific Grove, California. He later became the band's principal songwriter, sharing lead vocals with his Back Country Seven bandmate Gene Mason. People! performed about 200 concerts a year, appearing with Van Morrison and Them, the Animals, the Dave Clark Five, Paul Revere & the Raiders, the Doors, the Who, Janis Joplin, Jimi Hendrix, Moby Grape, and San Jose bands Syndicate of Sound and Count Five. The band's cover of the Zombies' "I Love You" became a hit single, selling over one million copies and charting strongly in several markets. Norman left People! just as Capitol released the band's first album in mid 1968, but reunited with Mason for concerts in 1974 and 2006. According to rock historian Walter Rasmussen, Pete Townshend once said that The Who's 1969 album Tommy was inspired by the rock opera "Epic" by People!; however, Townshend has since denied the connection.

=== Hollywood street ministry ===
Soon after Norman left People!, he had "a powerful spiritual encounter that threw him into a frenzy of indecision about his life [and] for the first time in his life, he received what he understood to be the Holy Spirit".

In July 1968, following a job offer to write musicals for Capitol Records, Norman moved to Los Angeles where he "spent time sharing the gospel on the streets". As he described in 2006: "I walked up and down Hollywood Boulevard several times a day ... witnessing to businessmen and hippies, and to whomever the Spirit led me. I spent all of my Capitol Records' royalties starting a halfway house and buying clothes and food for new converts." He was initially associated with the First Presbyterian Church of Hollywood, and its Salt Company coffee house outreach ministry, where he explored and pioneered the rock-gospel genre.

=== Musical theatre ===
In 1968 Norman wrote several songs for the rock musicals Alison and Birthday for Shakespeare, both of which were performed in Los Angeles.

The next year, Norman and his friend Teddy Neeley auditioned for the Los Angeles production of the rock musical Hair and were offered the roles of George Berger and Claude Bukowski, respectively; Neeley accepted, but Norman rejected the role of George, despite his own financial struggles, because "of its glorification of drugs and free sex as the answers to today's problems". Also in 1969, Norman wrote a musical called Love on Haight Street and a rock opera called Lion's Breath, which led Capitol to re-sign Norman to record an album, with the promise of complete creative control.

=== Recording career ===
The Simpsons parody comic of Larry Norman

In 1969, Capitol Records released Norman's first solo album, Upon This Rock, produced by Hal Yoergler, is now considered to be "the first full-blown Christian rock album". Norman was denounced by various television evangelists, and Capitol deemed the album a commercial flop and dropped Norman from the label. However, his music gained a large following in the emerging countercultural movements. Sales of the album rose following its distribution in Christian bookstores.

By the early 1970s, Norman was performing frequently for large audiences, and appeared at several Christian music festivals, including Explo '72, a six-day Dallas event which has been called the "Jesus Woodstock." Norman established a half-way house where he "housed and fed various groups of people, supervised their Bible studies and drove them to church on Fridays and Sundays". He earned $80 per month from Capitol for polishing and refining songs for Capitol artists. In 1970, Norman began a record label, One Way Records. He released two of his own albums Street Level and Bootleg on the label as well as Randy Stonehill's first album, Born Twice.

In 1971, Norman first visited England where he lived and worked for several years. He recorded two studio albums, Only Visiting This Planet and So Long Ago the Garden, in London's AIR Studios. Released in 1972, Visiting "was meant to reach the flower children disillusioned by the government and the church" with its "abrasive, urban reality of the gospel", and has often been ranked as Norman's best album. The release of Garden in November 1973 was met with controversy in the Christian press, due to the album's cover art and some songs in which Norman took the persona of a backslider.

In 1974, Norman founded Solid Rock Records to produce records for Christian artists "who didn't want to be consumed by the business of making vinyl pancakes but who wanted to make something 'non-commercial' to the world". Norman produced music on the label for artists including Randy Stonehill, Mark Heard and Tom Howard. Norman also worked with several artists who were signed to other labels, including Malcolm and Alwyn, Bobby Emmons and the Crosstones, Lyrix, James Sundquist and David Edwards. Norman signed a deal with ABC Records to distribute Solid Rock's releases, but was later moved to ABC subsidiary Word Records. In the same year, Norman founded the Christian artist booking agency Street Level Artists Agency.

In Another Land, the third album in Norman's trilogy and the best-selling album of his career, was released in 1976 by Solid Rock and distributed through Word. Soon afterward, Norman recorded the blues-rock concept album Something New under the Son, but it would not be released until 1981. Following clashes with Word over Something New and several other projects, Norman started Phydeaux Records in 1980 to release his albums.

In 1978, Norman was injured during a plane landing at Los Angeles International Airport. Norman claimed to have suffered mild brain damage due to being hit by parts of the cabin's roof, and that this damage left him unable to complete projects and focus artistically. William Ayers wrote in 1991: "As family, friends and fans watched, his life spiraled downward. He was unable to record a bonafide album from the time of his airplane accident in 1978 until ... he attempted to release the badly produced Home at Last [recorded in 1986]. He never expected to be healed."

In September 1979, Norman performed his "The Great American Novel", "a Dylanesque protest song", for U.S. president Jimmy Carter and about 1,000 guests at the Old Fashioned Gospel Singin' concert held on the south lawn of the White House.

Following a prolonged dispute with Solid Rock artists Daniel Amos which ended in estrangement, Solid Rock's business manager, Philip Mangano, and several Solid Rock musicians organized an intervention with Norman in June 1980, which led him to begin closing the company. Religious history professor Randall Balmer attributed the company's demise to "idealism, marital difficulties, and financial naivete—as well as changing musical tastes."

In late 1980, Norman moved to England and, with his father, founded Phydeaux Records, a company designed to compete with the bootleg market by selling rarities from Norman's own archives. He signed a distribution deal with British label Chapel Lane and released several albums before returning to the United States in 1985. Norman then began work on an anthology project celebrating his career in Christian music, beginning with the album White Blossoms from Black Roots: The History and the Chronology: Volume One; however, the project collapsed when the head of the distribution company was arrested for check forgery and the company's merchandise was seized by the FBI.

Norman signed to Benson Records in 1986 and recorded the album Home at Last, although the album was not released until 1989 due to legal problems. Despite extensive promotion, the album was negatively reviewed, and Norman himself later dismissed the album as "just a collection of tapes I had", although he said separately that he was "extremely happy" with the level of support he'd received from Benson. In 1989, Norman received the Christian Artists' Society Lifetime Achievement Award.

While visiting another musician at the close of a February 1991 tour, Norman received prayer for his long-term health problems from a pastor of London's Elim Way Fellowship. Norman maintained that through this prayer God repaired the damage to his brain and he was able to function again. That year, he collaborated with his brother Charles on the album Stranded in Babylon, hailed by both critics and fans as one of his best. They would reunite for the 2001 album Tourniquet.

Norman continued to perform and release albums throughout his later years in order to raise funds for medical expenses stemming from heart problems. He gave his last official concert on August 4, 2007, in New York City.

=== Relationship with the church and Christian music industry ===
Throughout his career, Norman had a contentious relationship with the wider Christian church and with the Christian music industry. He wrote in September 2007, "I love God and I follow Jesus but I just don't have much affinity for the organized folderol of the churches in the Western World." Norman's music addressed a wide range of social issues, such as politics, free love, the occult, the passive commercialism of wartime journalists, and religious hypocrisy, that were outside the scope of his contemporaries. Defending the confrontational approach of his music, Norman said, "My primary emphasis is not to entertain. But if your art is boring, people will reject your message as well as your art." In the 1980s, he complained that Christian music generally meant "sloppy thinking, dishonest metaphors and bad poetry," and that he had "never been able to get over the shock of how bad the lyrics are."

Norman disapproved of Christian musicians who were unwilling to play in secular venues or to "preach" between songs. He also criticized what he saw as the "commercialization of Christian music in America", including the role of copyrights and licensing.

=== Influence ===
In 2008, Christian rock historian John J. Thompson wrote, "It is certainly no overstatement to say that Larry Norman is to Christian music what John Lennon is to rock & roll or Bob Dylan is to folk music." Thompson credited Norman for his impact on the genre as a musician, a producer, and a businessman.

In the late 1970s and early 1980s, Norman also influenced a number of emerging punk and alternative rock artists. According to documentarian Larry Di Sabatino, Larry Norman was "an early influence" on the post-punk band U2. When U2 band founder Bono met with a summit of Nashville Christian music artists in 2002 to garner support for an African aid campaign, he specifically asked to see Norman. Upon Larry Norman's death, Bono sent flowers to his funeral with the note "Eternal singer, still eternal, Bono."

According to Charles Normal, Larry Norman attended his "first of many" punk rock shows while touring London in 1977, seeing Richard Hell and the Voidoids, the Damned, and Dead Boys. Regarding the punk movement, Norman stated that while he initially disliked some of the lyrical content, he was generally supportive of it and its youthful energy, which he viewed as preferable to disco.

Norman subsequently introduced his younger brother, Charles, to the genre, including the music of the Sex Pistols. Within several years, Charles was the lead guitarist for the Bay Area hardcore punk band, Executioner. Larry paid for the recording of Executioner's first EP in 1982, on the condition that they also record one of his songs. Larry Norman began to meet figures from the L.A. punk scene, and eventually recorded tracks with former Sex Pistols guitarist Steve Jones. Norman also released a live recording of a punk version of "Why Should the Devil Have All the Good Music?"

Pixies frontman Black Francis described Larry Norman as having been his "total idol" as a teenager, whom he attempted to imitate. The band's first demo, The Purple Tape, was to contain a cover of Norman's song "Watch What You're Doing", but it was never released. A lyric from the song "Levitate Me" ("Come on pilgrim, you know He loves you!") formed the basis for the title of Pixies' 1987 EP Come On Pilgrim. Black was eventually introduced to Norman by members of U2 during the Zoo TV tour. Black's post-Pixies band, Frank Black and the Catholics, covered Larry Norman's song "Six Sixty Six". Norman and Black performed a duet of "Watch What You're Doing" at Norman's "farewell" concert, and the two were reportedly working on an album together at the time of his death, along with Isaac Brock of Modest Mouse.

Steve Camp, Carolyn Arends, Bob Hartman, TobyMac, Mark Salomon, Martyn Joseph, and Steve Scott have credited Norman as influences. Overall over 300 artists have covered songs by Norman.

== Awards and honors ==
- 1973: One of three named as Best New Male Artist of the year by Cashbox.
- 1989: Awarded the Christian Artists' Society Lifetime Achievement Award in a surprise ceremony at Estes Park, Colorado.
- 1990: CCM magazine voted Only Visiting This Planet as "the second-greatest Christian album ever recorded".
- 2001: Inducted into the Gospel Music Hall of Fame.
- 2001: Only Visiting This Planet was selected as the No. 2 album in CCM Magazine's The 100 Greatest Albums in Christian Music.
- 2004: Voted into the CCM Hall of Fame by readers of CCM Magazine.
- 2007: Inducted into the San Jose Rocks Hall of Fame, both as a member of People!, and as a solo artist. At that time Norman reunited for a concert with People!
- 2008: Honored at the 39th GMA Dove Award ceremony in Nashville, Tennessee.
- 2009: Honored in a tribute segment at the Grammy Awards.
- 2013: Only Visiting This Planet was one of 25 sound recordings inducted for 2013 into the Library of Congress National Recording Registry, that preserves as "cultural, artistic and/or historical treasures, representing the richness and diversity of the American soundscape." A statement by the Library of Congress called the album "the key work in the early history of Christian rock," describing Norman as one who "commented on the world as he saw it from his position as a passionate, idiosyncratic outsider to mainstream churches."

== Family ==
Norman married actress and model Pamela Fay Ahlquist in December 1971. They separated in 1978 and divorced in September 1980.

In April 1982, Norman married Sarah Mae Finch. However another source indicates this was in April 1984. Finch had previously been married to Randy Stonehill from 1975 to 1980. The two had first met at a religious retreat in 1969. Their only child, Michael David Fariah Finch Norman, was born in August 1985. The couple divorced in 1995.

In 2008, World magazine speculated Norman fathered a son with an Australian woman during a 1988 tour, although definitive proof was never presented.

== Coronary issues and death ==
In February 1992, Norman suffered a nine-hour heart attack that resulted in permanent heart damage, leading to frequent hospitalizations in the years that followed. By early 1995, Norman had been hospitalized thirteen times and had a defibrillator implant, which enabled him to perform occasional small concerts.

After a lengthy illness, Norman died on February 24, 2008, at the age of 60 at his home in Salem, Oregon. The previous day he had posted on his website:

I feel like a prize in a box of Cracker Jacks with God's hand reaching down to pick me up. I have been under medical care for months. My wounds are getting bigger. I have trouble breathing. I am ready to fly home. I won't be here much longer. I can't do anything about it. My heart is too weak. I want to say goodbye to everyone ... I want to say I love you. I'd like to push back the darkness with my bravest effort ... Goodbye, farewell, we will meet again.

Following a public memorial on March 1 at the Church on the Hill in Turner, Oregon, Norman was buried in Salem's City View Cemetery. His tombstone reads: "Larry Norman / Evangelist Without Portfolio / 1947–2008 / Bloodstained Israelite".

== Fallen Angel documentary ==
Fallen Angel: The Outlaw Larry Norman: A Bible Story is a controversial 2008 documentary on Norman's life by filmmaker David Di Sabatino. Fallen Angel includes interviews with several people who had worked with or been close to Norman thirty years earlier, including his first wife and Randy Stonehill, who recorded the film's official soundtrack, Paradise Sky.

Norman and his second wife had refused to participate in or cooperate with the project. A cease and desist notice initiated by Norman's family temporarily prevented the film's public screening, and prompted Di Sabatino to file his own lawsuit against Solid Rock in March 2009. Four months later, the case was settled out of court, allowing the film to be shown. While interviewing Stonehill, Cross Rhythms' Mike Rimmer said the film portrayed Norman as "Machiavellian, particularly in his dealings with his artists."

Norman's Solid Rock Records was said to have ended when, "Things finally fell apart in 1979, after it was discovered Larry was cheating on his wife – and having an affair with Randy's wife", a claim Norman's brother denies. Gregory Alan Thornbury's biography of Norman proposes an alternate date and reason for Solid Rock Records being wound up and the artists released from their contracts. Word Records signalled they planned to end their relationship with Solid Rock due to poor sales performances of a few of the albums and the infrequent nature of releases being delivered by the label and this news led to a breakdown in the working and personal relationship between Larry Norman and Philip Mangano in May 1980. Some discussions had already begun about certain artists being released from their contracts prior to the meeting on June 17, 1980, which was called to "clear up the relationship between Solid Rock and Street Level Artists Agency, and to deal with Daniel Amos' request to have all their contracts back from Solid Rock — management, recording, tapes, publishing, and so on" and which ended two hours later in stalemate and acrimony rather than resolution.

== Select discography ==
Since the 1960s, Norman's work has appeared on over 100 albums, compilations, and concert bootlegs. These recordings have been released under various labels and with various artists. Some of his principal albums are:

- Upon This Rock (1969)
- Street Level (1970)
- Bootleg (1972)
- Only Visiting This Planet (1972)
- So Long Ago the Garden (1973)
- In Another Land (1976)
- Something New under the Son (1981)
- Home at Last (1989)
- Stranded in Babylon (1991)
- Tourniquet (2001)

== Autobiography ==
- The Long Road Home: Vaudeville, Dancing and How My Mother Met My Father. Salem, OR: Solid Rock Publications, 2007.
