= Randy Stonehill =

American songwriter (born 1952)

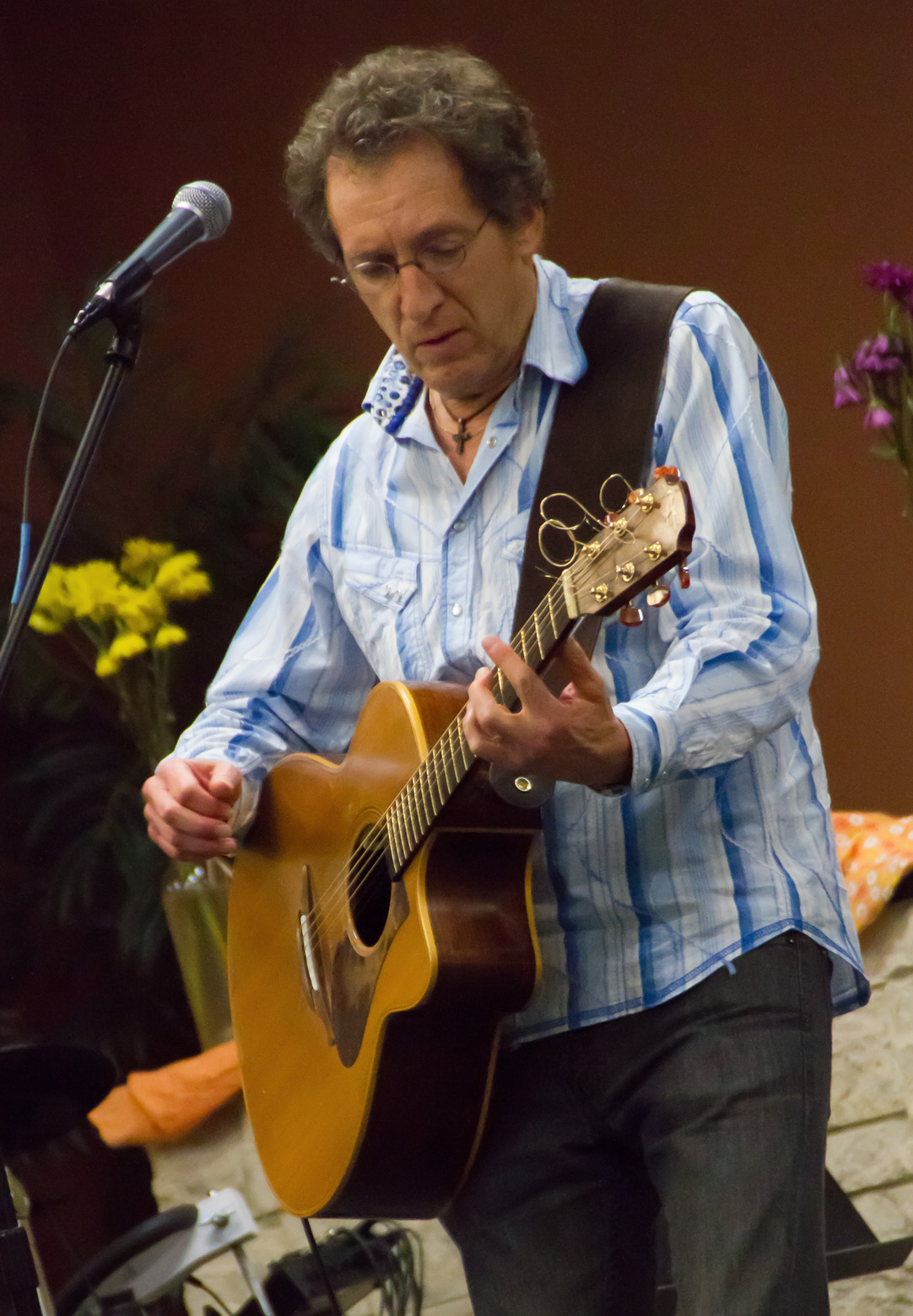
- In concert May 2014 in Fremont, California

Background information
- Born: Randall Evan Stonehill; March 12, 1952 (age 73); Stockton, California, U.S.
- Genres: Contemporary Christian, folk rock, rock
- Years active: 1971–present
- Labels: Solid Rock, Myrrh, StreetLevel
- Website: www.RandyStonehill.com
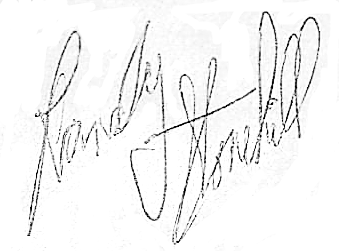
- Signature

Randall Evan Stonehill (born March 12, 1952) is an American singer and songwriter from Stockton, California, best known as one of the pioneers of contemporary Christian music. His music is primarily folk rock in the style of James Taylor, but some of his albums have focused on new wave, pop, pop rock, roots rock, and children's music.

== Early life ==
Randy Stonehill was born in Stockton, California. the son of Leonard N. Stonehill and his wife, Pauline Correia and is the younger brother of Jeffrey Dean Stonehill.

He graduated from Leigh High School, in San Jose, California, then moved to Los Angeles where he stayed with Christian rock singer, Larry Norman.

== Career ==
Stonehill's first album, Born Twice was released in 1971, with financial help from Pat Boone. The album—one side a live performance, the other recorded in a studio—was recorded for a mere $US 800, and according to Stonehill, "sounds like every penny of it."

A year later, Stonehill made his film acting debut in The Blob sequel, Beware! The Blob (also known as Son of Blob), with Cindy Williams, in which he performed the unreleased song "Captain Coke". He also made a cameo appearance in the 1973 Billy Graham film Time to Run, performing his song "I Love You".

In 1976, Stonehill released the Larry Norman-produced Welcome to Paradise, for which Andy Johns did the engineering. This became a landmark album for the songwriter and was voted the "third most important contemporary Christian album" in a mid-1980s poll of Christian music critics.

In the late 1970s, Stonehill joined forces with rock band Daniel Amos for the "Amos 'n' Randy Tour". Daniel Amos went on to be Stonehill's band for his next two releases, and Stonehill later provided backing vocals on a number of Daniel Amos' projects.

1983 saw Stonehill's popular album Equator debut and go very rapidly out-of-print. The album is still widely sought after in both vinyl and cassette form. No re-releases on CD were issued.

1984's Celebrate This Heartbeat teamed Stonehill with longtime friend Phil Keaggy for the song "Who Will Save The Children?" In 1989 they formed The Keaggy/Stonehill Band with Daniel Amos bassist Tim Chandler and The Swirling Eddies' David Raven on drums. Keaggy and Stonehill also teamed up several other times, both live in concert and in the studio. They recorded and performed as Phil Keaggy and Sunday's Child in 1988. They also joined singer Margaret Becker, drummer Joe English (former member of Paul McCartney and Wings) and several others that same year for the Compassion All Star Band's album One by One.

== Marriages and family ==
Stonehill has been married three times, to Sarah Mae Finch, Sandra Jean Warner, and Leslie Sealander, with the first two marriages ending in divorce. His second marriage produced one daughter, Heather. Finch later married Larry Norman.

== Discography ==
- Born Twice (1971)
- Get Me Out Of Hollywood (1973)
- Welcome to Paradise (1976)
- The Sky Is Falling (1980)
- Between the Glory and the Flame (1981)
- Equator (1983)
- Celebrate This Heartbeat (1984)
- Love Beyond Reason (1985)
- The Wild Frontier (1986)
- Can't Buy a Miracle (1988)
- Return to Paradise (1989)
- Until We Have Wings (1990)
- Wonderama (1991)
- Stories (1993)
- The Lazarus Heart (1994)
- Our Recollections (1996)
- Thirst (1998)
- Uncle Stonehill's Hat (2001)
- Edge of the World (2002)
- Together Live! (with Phil Keaggy) (2006)
- The Definitive Collection (2007)
- Paradise Sky (2008)
- Spirit Walk (2011)
- Breath of God (with Buck Storm) (2013)
- Breath of God Volume 2 (with Buck Storm) (2015)
- Lost Art of Listening (2020)

=== Compilations and productions ===
- Time to Run, Original Motion Picture Soundtrack, 1973 album, produced by Anthony Harris (Stonehill performs on three tracks)
- Strong Hand of Love, tribute to Mark Heard, 1994
- Orphans of God, tribute to Mark Heard, 1996
- First Love: a Historic Gathering of Jesus Music Pioneers, Jesus Movement artist reunion album, 1998
- Surfonic Water Revival, tribute to surf music, 1998
- When Worlds Collide: A Tribute to Daniel Amos, Daniel Amos tribute album, 1999
- Making God Smile: An Artists' Tribute to the Songs of Beach Boy Brian Wilson, Brian Wilson tribute album, 2002
- There's a Rainbow Somewhere: The Songs of Randy Stonehill, Randy Stonehill tribute album, 2022

=== Videography ===
- Beware! The Blob (also known as Son of Blob). Motion Picture, 1972.
- Time to Run, World Wide Pictures. Motion Picture, 1973
- Love Beyond Reason: The Video Album, VHS, 1985
- One Night In 20 Years, anniversary live concert, VHS, 1990
- First Love: An Historic Gathering of Artists from the Jesus Movement, Volume 2, VHS, 1998; Re-released on DVD, 2005
- Together Live in concert with Phil Keaggy, DVD, 2006
- Fallen Angel: The Outlaw Larry Norman. Documentary, 2009

=== Works ===
- "Married Strangers", Christianity Today (Spring 1999)
