= Daniel Amos =

American rock band

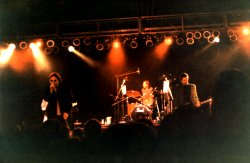
- Daniel Amos in concert at Cornerstone 1990

Background information
- Origin: Southern California, U.S.
- Genres: Christian rock; new wave; alternative rock; country rock (early)
- Years active: 1974–present
- Labels: Maranatha!; Solid Rock; NewPax; ¡Alarma!; Refuge; Frontline; Brainstorm Artists, Intl; Stunt; Galaxy21; Arena Rock
- Members: Terry Scott Taylor; Greg Flesch; Ed McTaggart
- Past members: Marty Dieckmeyer; Mark Cook; Steve Baxter; Jerry Chamberlain; Rob Watson; Alex MacDougall; Tim Chandler
- Website: danielamos.com

Daniel Amos (aka D. A., Dä) is an American Christian rock band formed in 1974 by Terry Scott Taylor on guitars and vocals, Marty Dieckmeyer on bass guitar, Steve Baxter on guitars and Jerry Chamberlain on lead guitars. The band currently consists of Taylor, guitarist Greg Flesch and drummer Ed McTaggart. Over the band's career, they have included keyboardist Mark Cook, drummer Alex MacDougall, bassist Tim Chandler and keyboardist Rob Watson with sounds that experimented with country rock, rock, new wave and alternative rock.

== Beginnings ==
The roots of Daniel Amos began to grow out of Jubal's Last Band, an acoustic quartet consisting of Taylor, Kenny Paxton, Chuck Starnes and Steve Baxter, who spent their time performing for Bible study groups and at coffee shops throughout Southern California. In 1974, JLB recorded a demo tape together and eventually lost Starnes and Paxton. Bassist Marty Dieckmeyer and guitarist Jerry Chamberlain were brought in to fill the empty spots. Sometime in the middle of 1975, Jubal's Last Band (minus Baxter) auditioned for Maranatha! Music and Calvary Chapel in hopes of signing a recording and performance contract. Another band at the meeting, led by Darrell Mansfield, had a similar name – Jubal. The two bands decided to change their names to avoid confusion. Mansfield renamed his band Gentle Faith (taken from the name of co-band member Henry Cutrona's earlier band), and Jubal's Last Band became Daniel Amos.

== Maranatha! Records era ==
Daniel Amos succeeded in landing a recording and performance contract and quickly recorded their first song for the label in 1975, Taylor's "Ain't Gonna Fight It", released later that year on the label's compilation album Maranatha 5. The band released their debut eponymous album in 1976 which was produced by pedal steel guitar player and producer Al Perkins. Soon after the release of that album, DA enlisted Ed McTaggart as their full-time drummer. Previously, McTaggart had been the drummer for Bill Sprouse Jr.'s The Road Home.

By 1977, the band had begun to shed their country sound with the album Shotgun Angel, which took some fans by surprise. Shotgun Angel was half country and half rock-opera. Side two of the LP featured lush orchestrations and a string of rock songs linked together in a way reminiscent of Queen, Pink Floyd and Abbey Road. Shotgun Angel also saw the departure of Steve Baxter and the addition of keyboardist Mark Cook. Cook had been the keyboardist for the band Spring Canyon, which had recorded an album for Warner Brothers a few years earlier with producer Richard Podolor that was never released, due to a change in management at Warner Brothers.

== Switch to Solid Rock Records ==
By 1978, the band had recorded their first entirely rock effort, Horrendous Disc, with help from newly added drummer/percussionist, Alex MacDougall. MacDougall had been a member of another Maranatha! Music band, The Way. Although it was recorded for Maranatha! Music, the album was dropped because of a major change in the focus of the label. They stopped releasing albums by rock and roll acts and instead focused on children's and praise music.

The band shopped the new record around to several labels, ending up on Larry Norman's Solid Rock Records. Solid Rock delayed the release for nearly three years and despite magazine article and radio specials promoting it, the album did not hit record store shelves until a week before the release of the band's newly recorded fourth album ¡Alarma! in 1981. The long delay led to the departure of MacDougall and Cook, and was the subject of a series of articles and letters to the editor in CCM Magazine.

From the connection with Solid Rock, Daniel Amos began working with singer/songwriter Randy Stonehill. The band began touring heavily with Stonehill in the late 1970s. DA performed their own set and, after a Stonehill acoustic set, served as Stonehill's backing band for another set. That tour, known as the "Amos n' Randy Tour", became legendary for DA and Stonehill fans. Taylor produced four of Stonehill's albums (1981's Between the Glory and the Flame, 1983's Equator, 1992's Wonderama, and 1993's Stories), using DA as backing musicians.

== ¡Alarma! Chronicles ==
¡Alarma! was the first of a four-part series of albums entitled The ¡Alarma! Chronicles, which also included the albums Doppelgänger, Vox Humana, and Fearful Symmetry. On the tours that followed each release beginning with Doppelgänger, the band used a full multimedia event complete with video screens synchronized to the music. The stage setup also included mannequins, a 3D slide show and actors portraying game show announcers and models for the song "New Car!" More personnel changes occurred during this era as Tim Chandler replaced Dieckmeyer in September 1981. Chamberlain left in mid 1983. For a short time, guitarist Milo Carter toured with the band. For the first half of 1984, they toured without a second guitarist and made Vox Humana. Greg Flesch joined as the lead guitar player in September 1984 for the subsequent tour. Keyboardist Rob Watson joined the band to play keyboards on tour in 1983 and for the next two albums.

In 2000, the band released the four albums in a three-disc set packaged together with a booklet collectively titled, The ¡Alarma! Chronicles. Additional material was provided by columnists John Thompson, Bruce Brown, Randy Layton, Brian Quincy Newcomb and others.

== Swirling Eddies/Stunt Records ==
The band released Darn Floor-Big Bite in 1987. Although Darn Floor was an artistically ambitious and critically acclaimed effort, it sold poorly. In the late 1980s, many of the band members became The Swirling Eddies for a string of releases through the early 1990s. In 1990, D.A. would form their own independent record label, Stunt Records, with help from friend Tom Gulotta. One of the first albums released by Stunt was the half comedy, half rarities and best of compilation from Dr. Edward Daniel Taylor, The Miracle Faith Prickly Heat Telethon of Love. Over the years that followed, Stunt became the primary source for new DA material, including the live albums, Live Bootleg '82 and Preachers from Outer Space!. Jason and Eric Townsend, producers of the DA Tribute CD When Worlds Collide, would join the Stunt Records organization in 2000 to help with promotion and production work.

In addition to recording several albums as The Swirling Eddies, the members of DA returned in 1991 with Kalhöun. 1993's MotorCycle followed, which also marked the return of Chamberlain, who would hang around long enough for two additional DA releases in the 1990s, BibleLand in 1994 and Songs of the Heart in 1995. Songs of the Heart was a concept album that followed the fictional couple, Bud & Irma Ackendorf, on a trip down the historic U.S. Route 66. The concept was explored in greater detail in the 2002 three-CD "book set" entitled When Everyone Wore Hats. That collection not only included the entire 1995 album, but also the entire album reworked as an acoustic band, three new songs, an interview of Taylor by Starflyer59's Jason Martin, photos, expanded liner notes and a newly written short story by Taylor. In 1994, DA joined artists like Randy Stonehill, The Choir, Bruce Cockburn, Victoria Williams, Kate Taylor, Debby Boone, Chagall Guevara, Carolyn Arends, and others to record songs for Orphans of God, a double disc release that paid tributed to singer/songwriter Mark Heard, who died in 1992 following a performance at the Cornerstone Festival.

== 2000–present ==
In mid-1999, a number of artists joined to contribute to a tribute album entitled When Worlds Collide: A Tribute to Daniel Amos. Artists lending their voices (and guitars) to the project included longtime band friends like Randy Stonehill, Jimmy Abegg, Phil Madeira, Starflyer 59, Brian Healy, and others. Also making a surprise appearance on the project was Larry Norman, who had not worked with the band since the delays surrounding the Horrendous Disc album. The tribute album was released in time for Cornerstone 2000.

In 2001, DA released what many critics called their best album to date, Mr Buechner's Dream, named after author Frederick Buechner. The album also pays tribute to Walker Percy, T. S. Eliot, G. K. Chesterton, Flannery O'Connor, Lewis Carroll, Dorothy L. Sayers, and other authors that have inspired DA's lyrics for years. The album was released on Stunt Records. The band had such a creative time in the studio that they ended up with more than 30 brand new songs to include on the new album.

Stunt Records released a two-disc 30th anniversary deluxe edition of the band's first album, Daniel Amos in June 2006. It included an expanded booklet of never-before-seen photos, additional liner notes, and an entire extra disc of bonus material including early demos and live recordings from the pre-DA years. Five years later, Born Twice Records re-issued the disc alone for the 35th anniversary. This deluxe reissue was the first in a series of deluxe multi-disc reissues of the band's catalog.

In 2010 the band's official website announced plans to release a new Daniel Amos studio album in 2011. The band will also be performing some concerts in 2011, including an appearance at Cornerstone Festival. The band's website also announced that Deluxe Editions of their debut album, Shotgun Angel and Mr. Buechner's Dream would be released in June in time for the band's tour. The Deluxe Edition of Shotgun Angel premiered at the band's first 2011 show in Nashville, TN. The Deluxe Mr Buechner's Dream premiered at the band's show of June 18, 2011 in Wilmington, OH.

In late 2012, Daniel Amos launched a Kickstarter campaign to fund the production of a new album. Titled Dig Here Said the Angel, it featured the lineup of Taylor, Flesch, Chandler and McTaggart with appearances from earlier band members Jerry Chamberlain and Rob Watson. Recording sessions began in Nashville, TN. in February, 2013, at Brown Owl Studios and was released in July 2013. At the same time a remastered two-CD deluxe edition of the band's ¡Alarma! album was released. Stunt Records followed that reissue with a deluxe edition of Doppelgänger in 2014, a deluxe edition of Vox Humana in 2016, and with the help of another Kickstarter campaign, a deluxe Horrendous Disc box set was released on CD and vinyl in 2018. The extensive Deluxe Box Set of Horrendous Disc brought together remastered editions of the album itself, taken from the original master, as well as dozens of previously unreleased mixes, alternate takes, demos and studio recordings, including several songs produced by Larry Norman.

Tim Chandler, who had been the band's bass guitarist since 1982, died on October 8, 2018. Founding member Steve Baxter died on September 9, 2020.In early 2026, a print version of the Daniel Amos Timeline became available through Amazon in two volumes. The books chronicle the band's history through stories, photos, concert dates and set lists and other historical information.

== Discography ==
=== Albums ===
- Daniel Amos, 1976 debut album
- Shotgun Angel, 1977 album
- Horrendous Disc, 1981 album
- ¡Alarma!, 1981 album
- Doppelgänger, 1983 album
- Vox Humana, 1984 album
- Fearful Symmetry, 1986 album
- Darn Floor-Big Bite, 1987 album
- Kalhöun, 1991 album
- MotorCycle, 1993 album
- Bibleland, 1994 album
- Songs of the Heart, 1995 album
- Mr. Buechner's Dream, 2001 double CD. CD 1 entitled: Mr. Buechner's Dream, CD 2 entitled: And So It Goes.
- Dig Here said the Angel, 2013 album

=== Live albums ===
- Live Bootleg '82, 1990
- Preachers From Outer Space!, 1994 An historic night, recorded live at the Anaheim Convention Center, Easter Weekend 1978
- Live at Cornerstone 2000, 2000

=== Special releases ===
- The Revelation, 1986, re-issued 2000
- Daniel Amos (30th Anniversary Deluxe Reissue), 2006
- Darn Floor – Big Bite (20th Anniversary Deluxe Edition), 2008
- Daniel Amos (35th Anniversary Deluxe Reissue), 2011
- Shotgun Angel (2 CD Deluxe Collectors Edition), 2011
- Mr Buechner's Dream (Deluxe Collectors Edition), 2011
- ¡Alarma! 2-Disc collector's edition, 2013 containing ¡Alarma! and a 21-track bonus disc
- Horrendous Disc Deluxe Box Set, 2018 containing Horrendous Disc and four bonus discs

=== Compilation albums ===
- Dr. Edward Daniel Taylor – The Miracle Faith Prickly Heat Telethon of Love, 1990
- Maranatha – Long Play Country Gospel, as Daniel Amos AND Cowboy Billy McBride 1991
- Orphans of God, tribute to Mark Heard, 1996
- Our Personal Favorite World Famous Hits, 1998
- Surfonic Water Revival, 1999
- Terry Scott Taylor's Swine Before Pearl, volume 1, 2011, includes previously unreleased demos
- Terry Scott Taylor's Swine Before Pearl, volume 2, 2011, includes previously unreleased songs, demos, remixes and live tracks

=== Bibliography ===
- Daniel Amos – The Alarma! Chronicles Book Set, Publisher: Stunt Records 2000
- Daniel Amos – When Everyone Wore Hats Book Set, Publisher: Stunt Records 2001
- Daniel Amos – The Horrendous Book, Publisher: Stunt Books 2018 (ISBN 978-0-692-12927-2)
- Townsend, Eric – The Daniel Amos Timeline, Volume One, Publisher: Amazon 2026 (ISBN 979-8-1942-2571-2)
- Townsend, Eric – The Daniel Amos Timeline, Volume Two, Publisher: Amazon, 2026 (ISBN 979-8-1942-2571-2)

=== Videos ===
- Daniel Amos Live in Anaheim 1985, 2003 DVD
- The Making of Mr. Buechner's Dream, 2005 DVD
- Instruction Through Film, May 2007, DVD

== Personnel ==
Current members

- Terry Taylor — guitars, harmonica, lead vocals (1975–present)
- Ed McTaggart - drums, background vocals (1976–present)
- Greg Flesch – guitars, accordion, keyboards, pan flute, violin, mandolin (1984–present)

Former members

- Jerry Chamberlain — lead guitars, lead and background vocals (1975–1983, 1993–1995, guest 2013)
- Marty Dieckmeyer — bass guitar, keyboards (1975–1982)
- Steve Baxter — acoustic guitar, harmonica, lead and background vocals (1975–1976)
- Mark Cook - keyboards, lead and background vocals (1975–1980)
- Alex MacDougall - drums, percussion (1978–1980)
- Tim Chandler – bass guitar, guitars, background vocals (1982–2018)
- Rob Watson – keyboards (1983–1986, guest 2013)

	75–76	76–78	78–80	80–82	82–83	83–84	84–86	86–93	93–95	95–13	13	13–18	18–present
Terry Taylor	guitars, harmonica, lead vocals												
Jerry Chamberlain	lead guitars, lead and background vocals								lead guitars, lead and background vocals		lead guitars, lead and background vocals		
Steve Baxter	acoustic guitar, harmonica, lead and background vocals												
Greg Flesch							guitars, accordion, keyboards, pan flute, violin, mandolin						
Marty Dieckmeyer	bass guitar, keyboards												
Tim Chandler					bass guitar, guitars, background vocals								
Mark Cook	keyboards, lead and background vocals												
Rob Watson						keyboards					keyboards		
Ed McTaggart		drums, background vocals											
Alex MacDougall			drums, percussion										
