= Greg Flesch =

American guitarist and musician

Greg Flesch (born 1960) is an American guitarist and musician, best known for his work with the rock bands Daniel Amos and The Swirling Eddies (credited as Gene Pool).

Flesch joined D.A. in 1984, just in time for the Vox Humana tour.

Besides his work with D.A., Flesch was also heavily involved in the 1991 Various Artists album, At the Foot of the Cross Volume One, produced by Derri Daugherty and Steve Hindalong. Flesch also produced Terry Scott Taylor's second solo album, A Briefing for the Ascent.

When not making music, Flesch, who holds BS and MS degrees in Computer Science, is employed as a Senior Information Systems and Computer Science specialist at NASA's Jet Propulsion Laboratory in Pasadena.
