= Ed McTaggart =

American musician and artist (born 1951)

Ed McTaggart (born July 10, 1951) is an American drummer and artist. He is best known as the drummer of the rock band Daniel Amos.

McTaggart joined DA in 1976, after years of playing with Bill Sprouse Jr.'s band The Road Home.

In the 1980s, McTaggart became the V.P. of Creative Services for Frontline Records.
