= Terry Scott Taylor =

American musician (born 1950)

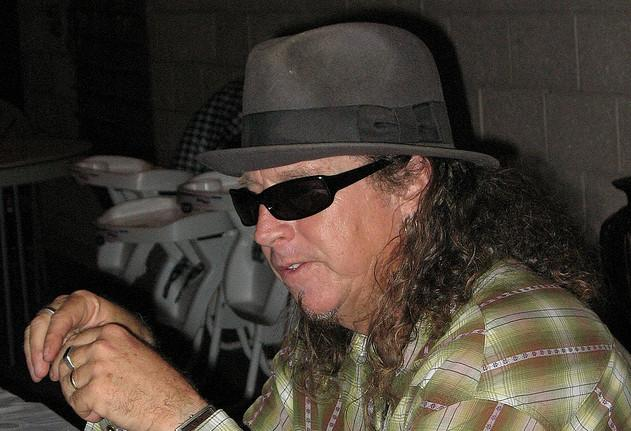
- Taylor in 2007

Background information
- Born: May 24, 1950 (age 76)
- Origin: Los Angeles, California, U.S.
- Genres: Rock; folk; blues; experimental
- Occupations: Musician; songwriter; record producer
- Years active: 1971–present
- Label: Stunt
- Member of: Daniel Amos; The Swirling Eddies; Lost Dogs

Terry Scott Taylor (born May 24, 1950) is an American songwriter, record producer, musician, and a founding member of the bands Daniel Amos and The Swirling Eddies (credited as Camarillo Eddy). He is also a member of the roots and alternative music group Lost Dogs.

== Influence ==
Numerous people have named Taylor and Daniel Amos as an influence over the years including Jonathan Coulton.

== Discography ==
- Knowledge & Innocence (1986)
- A Briefing for the Ascent (1987)
- Neverhood Songs (1996)
- John Wayne (1998)
- Avocado Faultline (2000)
- LITTLE, big (2002)
- All Day Sing and Dinner on the Ground (with Michael Roe, 2002)
- Songs for the Day After Christmas
- Imaginarium: Songs from the Neverhood (2004)
- Random Acts and Hodgepodge (2008)
- An Intimate Evening with Terry Scott Taylor (2009)
- Swine Before Pearl, Vol.1: Standard & Deluxe Editions (2010)
- Swine Before Pearl, Vol. 2: Madness and Blindness and Astonishment of the Heart (2011)
- The Return to The Neverhood (2012)
- The Music of Armikrog (2015)
- This Beautiful Mystery (2022)

=== Other appearances ===
- Surfonic Water Revival (Various Artists compilation, 1998)
- City on a Hill: It's Christmas Time (Various Artists compilation, 2002)
- Making God Smile: A Tribute to Beach Boy Brian Wilson (Various Artists compilation, 2002)
- Come as a Child or Not at All (compilation memorial with Theo Obrastoff, 2003)
