= List of songs based on poems =

This is a list of some poems that have been subsequently set to music. In the classical music tradition, this type of setting may be referred to as an art song. A poem set to music in the German language is called a lied, or in the French language, a Mélodie. A group of poems, usually by the same poet, which are set to music to form a single work, is called a song cycle.

== William Blake ==
- "Ten Blake Songs" are poems from Blake's "Songs of Innocence and of Experience" and "Auguries of Innocence", set to music by Ralph Vaughan Williams in 1957.
- "Tyger" is both the name of an album by Tangerine Dream, which is based on Blake's poetry, and the title of a song on this album based on the poem of the same name.
- "The Fly" by Esperanza Spalding (as the song "Little Fly" on her 2010 album Chamber Music Society)
- Cosmo Sheldrake adapted two songs of Blake's: "The Fly" into a song of the same name, and "I Rose Up At The Dawn Of Day" into the song "Solar".
- "And did those feet in ancient time" set to music by Sir Hubert Parry in 1916 and best known today as the anthem "Jerusalem." There have been many recordings, most notably by:
  - the British progressive rock band Emerson, Lake & Palmer for their Brain Salad Surgery album
  - the Grimethorpe Colliery Band, whose version was played in medal ceremonies for the 2010 Commonwealth Games.
- Songs and Proverbs of William Blake, a 1965 song cycle by Benjamin Britten.

== Rachel Bluwstein ==
- "I Know to Speak Only of Myself"
  - by Chava Alberstein
  - by Geva Alon

== Robert Burns ==
- "A Red, Red Rose"
- "Sweet Afton" (His poems are made around the 1700s)
- "Auld Lang Syne"
- "Such a Parcel of Rogues in a Nation"

== George Gordon Byron ==
- See Musical settings of, or music inspired by, poems by Byron

== Florence Earle Coates ==
- Set to music by Mrs. H. H. A. Beach:
  - "For me the jasmine buds unfold". Op. 19, no. 1. For sop. or tenor and piano. 1 score (7 p.). Boston: Arthur P. Schmidt. (1892)
  - "Go not too far". Op. 56, no. 2. High and low voice. Words also printed as text. Caption title. 1 score (5 p.); 35 cm. Boston: Arthur P. Schmidt. (1904)
  - "I know not how to find the spring". Op. 56, no. 3. For medium voice and piano. Caption title. Words also printed as text on p. 2. 1 score (5 p.); 36 cm. Boston: Arthur P. Schmidt. (1904)
  - "Give me not love". Op. 61. Duet for soprano and tenor. Caption title. 1 score (7 p.); 34 cm. Boston: Arthur P. Schmidt. (1905)
  - "After". Op. 68. High and low voice. Words also printed as text. Caption title. 1 score (7 p.); 35 cm. Boston: Arthur P. Schmidt. (1909)
- Set to music by Clayton Johns:
  - "I love, and the world is mine". To Miss Lena Little. Sop. or tenor in G. Song [with piano acc.]; score (5p.) 35 cm. New York, G. Schirmer. (1891)
  - "I love, and the world is mine". To Miss Lena Little. Medium in F. Song [with piano acc.]; score (4p.) 35 cm. New York, G. Schirmer. (1891)
  - "When Phyllis comes" (1892)
  - "If love were not". 4 p. of music; 35 cm. Boston: Oliver Ditson & Co. (1904)
  - "So is my love to me" (1908)
- See also:
  - Works by Florence Earle Coates set to music by various composers – via Wikisource.

== Idris Davies ==
- Several of the parts of Davies' poem cycle Gwalia Deserta have been adapted into songs:
  - Part XV was used by Pete Seeger for the lyrics of "The Bells of Rhymney"
  - Part XXXIV was adapted by Max Boyce as "When We Walked to Merthyr Tydfil in the Moonlight Long Ago"
  - Part XXXVI was used by Public Service Broadcasting for the words of "Turn No More", sung by James Dean Bradfield, on the album Every Valley

== Emily Dickinson ==
- "I Felt a Funeral, in My Brain"
  - by Andrew Bird and Phoebe Bridgers
- "Because I Could Not Stop for Death"
  - by Natalie Merchant
  - by John Adams
  - by Aaron Copland (Composer)
- "Wild Nights" was also featured as part of Adam's composition Harmonium
- The album No Promises by Carla Bruni includes three poems by Emily Dickinson
  - "I Felt My Life With Both My Hands"
  - "I Went To Heaven"
  - "If You Were Coming In The Fall"
- "Hope"
  - by Trailer Bride on Hope Is a Thing With Feathers (Album)
- Too Few the Mornings Be: Eleven Songs for Soprano and Piano by Ricky Ian Gordon, written for Renée Fleming
  - "Too few the mornings be"
  - "If all the griefs I am to have"
  - "The bustle in a house"
  - "This is my letter to the world"
  - "You cannot put a fire out"
  - "Bee! I'm expecting you!"
  - "Poor little heart!"
  - "I'm nobody! Who are you?
  - "How happy is the little stone"
  - "Estranged from beauty"
  - "Will there really be a morning?"

== A. E. Housman ==
- "Six poems from "A Shropshire Lad" were set to music in "On Wenlock Edge" by Ralph Vaughan Williams.

== Patrick Kavanagh ==
- The poem On Raglan Road was put to music when the poet met Luke Kelly of the well-known Irish band The Dubliners in a pub in Dublin. It was set to the music of the traditional song "The Dawning of the Day" (Fáinne Geal an Lae).

== Federico García Lorca ==
- See Federico García Lorca in Music

== Pablo Neruda ==
- Luciana Souza's album Neruda is a collection of jazz arrangements of the works of Pablo Neruda (translated into English).
- Many of Pablo Neruda's works are featured on the album Quilapayún Chante Neruda

== Alfred Noyes ==
- The American folk and protest singer Phil Ochs set Alfred Noyes' poem "The Highwayman" to music on his 1965 album, I Ain't Marching Anymore.

Also done by Loreena McKennitt.

== Edgar Allan Poe ==
- See Edgar Allan Poe and music

== Christina Rossetti ==
- "Remember"
- "Promises Like Pie Crust" is featured on the album No Promises by Carla Bruni

When I Am Dead My Dearest was recorded by the Kruger Brothers on their album Between the Notes

== William Shakespeare ==
- "Under the Greenwood Tree" by Donovan
- The album When Love Speaks features several of Shakespeare's works set to music:
  - "When, in disgrace with fortune and men's eyes" performed by Rufus Wainwright (Sonnet 29)
  - "No more be grieved at that which thou hast done" performed by Keb' Mo' (Sonnet 35)
  - "The quality of mercy is not strained" performed by Des'ree (The Merchant of Venice, Act IV, scene 1)
  - "The Willow Song" performed by Barbara Bonney (Othello, Act IV, scene 3)
  - "Music to hear, why hearst thou music sadly" performed by Ladysmith Black Mambazo (Sonnet 8)
  - "Shall I compare thee to a summer's day" performed by Bryan Ferry (Sonnet 18)
- Two pieces of Shakespeare's plays were set to music by Loreena McKennitt:
  - "Cymbeline" by Loreena McKennitt (Cymbeline, Act V, scene 2)
  - "Prospero's Speech" by Loreena McKennitt (The Tempest, Act V, scene 1)
- "O Mistress Mine" by Emilie Autumn, from the album A Bit O' This & That (Twelfth Night, Act II, Scene III)
- "Double Trouble", a song from the Harry Potter and the Prisoner of Azkaban soundtrack, has rearranged lyrics taken entirely from Macbeth (Act IV, scene I)

== Hannah Szenes ==
- "A Walk to Caesarea"
  - by Regina Spektor
  - by Sophie Milman
  - by Netanela
- "Blessed Is the Match"

== William Butler Yeats ==
- "An Appointment with Mr Yeats" by The Waterboys is an album of Yeats poems set to song.
- The poem "Down by the Salley Gardens" was based by Yeats on a fragment of a song he heard an old woman singing. Yeats' words have been recorded as a song by many performers.
- The song "A Bad Dream" by Keane is based on the poem "An Irish Airman Foresees His Death".
- "Those Dancing Days Are Gone" and "Before the World Was Made" are both performed by Carla Bruni on the album "No Promises".
- "Song Of Wandering Aengus" was performed by Donovan, Judy Collins, Chris Thompson and many more.
- Loreena McKennitt has set two Yeats poems to music:
  - "Stolen Child" (Also set to music by The Waterboys, although mostly spoken)
  - "The Two Trees"
- "The Song of a Wandering Aengus" is set to music by Caroline Herring.
- '5 Songs on Poems by W.B.Yeats' composed by Dutch composer Carolien Devilee (A Faery Song, He wishes for the clothes of heaven, The lake isle of Innisfree, To his heart, bidding it have no fear & The everlasting voices)
- "Tread Softly" by Tiny Ruins, uses the words of "The Cloths of Heaven" by Yeats.
- "He Wishes For the Cloths of Heaven" by North Sea Radio Orchestra sets Yeats' poem of the same title to music.
- The album "Branduardi Canta Yeats" features the works of Yeats performed by Angelo Branduardi in Italian
- "The Lake Isle of Innisfree" is set to music by composer Muriel Herbert.

== Odysseas Elytis ==
- "The Blood of Love"
  - by Mikis Theodorakis

== Miscellaneous ==
- "dragonfly" by Fleetwood mac poem by William Henry Davies
- "The Little Man Who Wasn't There", from poem "Antigonish"
- "I Am Stretched on Your Grave" is a translation of the Irish poem "Táim Sínte ar do Thuama"
- "Strange Fruit" by Lewis Allan (Abel Meeropol)
- "Do Not Go Gentle Into That Good Night" by Dylan Thomas
- In addition to the works listed above, Loreena McKennitt has adapted the following poems to music:
  - "Moon Cradle" by Padraic Colum
  - "Snow" by Archibald Lampman
  - "The Highwayman" by Alfred Noyes
  - "The Lady of Shalott" by Alfred Tennyson
  - "The Dark Night of the Soul" by Juan de Yepes Alvarez (St. John of the Cross)
- Donovan has set many poems to music in addition to the ones already mentioned:
  - The album H.M.S. Donovan includes several poems from One Hundred Poems for Children compiled by Herbert Strang
  - "Jabberwocky" by Lewis Carroll
  - "Walrus and the Carpenter" by Lewis Carroll
  - "Wynken, Blynken and Nod" by Eugene Field
  - "Queen Mab" by Thomas Hood
  - "The Owl and the Pussycat" by Edward Lear
- "Do not stand at my grave and weep" by Mary Elizabeth Frye was translated into Japanese and set to music under the title "Sen no Kaze ni Natte" (I Am the Thousand Winds). It is also set to music by Howard Goodall in the movement Lacrymosa from Eternal Light, A Requiem.
- Theodore Roethke's poem "The Waking" has been recorded by Kurt Elling on his album Nightmoves.
- Kate McGarry performs E.E. Cummings' poem "I Carry Your Heart" on her album If Less Is More... Nothing Is Everything
- The lyrics of the song "How Fortunate the Man With None" by Dead Can Dance are from John Willett's translation of Bertolt Brecht's poem "Die Ballade von den Prominenten"
- Charles Baudelaire's poem "Paysage" was turned into a song by the group Les Colocs
- The album No Promises by Carla Bruni also includes works by W. H. Auden, Dorothy Parker, and Walter de la Mare
- John Adams' Harmonium begins with a setting of "Negative Love" by John Donne
- Annie Lennox performed part of "Live With Me and Be My Love" by Christopher Marlowe (later borrowed by Shakespeare) for the album When Love Speaks
- Paul Verlaine's "Dansons La Gigue" is performed by Patricia Barber on her album Verse.
- The album Music Through Heartsongs is a collection of poetry by Mattie Stepanek, performed by Billy Gilman
- John Denver performed "The Box"
- Percy Bysshe Shelley's poem "Ozymandias" has been recorded by Jean-Jacques Burnel
- Max Dunn's poem "I Danced Before I had Two Feet" was turned into a song ("I Danced") by the band Violent Femmes
- Thrice adapted E.E. Cummings' poem "Since feeling is first" into their song "A Living Dance Upon Dead Minds"
- William Wordsworth's "Lucy" suite of poems was performed by The Divine Comedy on the album Liberation.
- Richard Lovelace's poem "To Althea, From Prison" was recorded by Fairport Convention on their album Nine.
- "In the Gloaming", a popular song of 1877, with lyrics from an earlier published poem.
- Composer Dan Welcher created a song cycle out of the poetry chapbook 'Matchbook' by Beth Gylys.
- Edward Lear's poem "The Pelican Chorus" was adapted into the song "Pelicans We" by Cosmo Sheldrake.
- Johnny Cash's "Drink to Me Only with Thine Eyes," from Ben Jonson's poem "Song: To Celia."
- Anna Dennis and Voice of Music's "Gather Ye Rosebuds While Ye May," from Robert Herrick's poem "To the Virgins, to Make Much of Time."
- Rudyard Kipling's poem, "If," is adapted by Joni Mitchell on her album, Shine.
- John Cooper Clarke's poem, "I Wanna Be Yours," was adapted into the song "I Wanna Be Yours" by the Arctic Monkeys.

== See also ==
- Song poem
- English art song
- American art song
- The Works of Morten Lauridsen
