= Tyger (album) =

- 1987 LP album cover

Studio album by Tangerine Dream
- Released: 15 June 1987
- Recorded: 1987
- Genre: Electronic
- Labels: Jive Electro; Caroline
- Producer: Tangerine Dream

Tangerine Dream chronology
Underwater Sunlight (1986)	Tyger (1987)	Three O'Clock High (1987)

Singles from Tyger
- 1. "Tyger" Released: 15 June 1987

Professional ratings
Review scores
Source	Rating
AllMusic	3/5 stars

Tyger is the thirtieth major release and seventeenth studio album by Tangerine Dream. It is based on the poetry of William Blake. Three of the tracks have lyrics taken from the poems The Tyger, London and Smile. The track London also incorporates lines from A Little Girl Lost, America: a Prophecy and The Fly.

This was the final studio album to feature long-time member Christopher Franke.

"Tyger" spent one week on the UK Albums Chart at No.88. This is Tangerine Dream's last UK Albums Chart appearance to date.

== Track listing ==
1987 release

No.	Title	Length
1.	"Tyger"	5:45
2.	"London"	14:22
3.	"Alchemy of the Heart"	12:23
4.	"Smile"	6:08
5.	"21st Century Common Man (Part 1)" (CD version only)	4:49
6.	"21st Century Common Man (Part 2)" (CD version only)	4:00

1992 release

No.	Title	Length
1.	"Tyger" (re-mixed version)	5:13
2.	"London"	14:25
3.	"Alchemy of the Heart"	12:07
4.	"Smile" (faster version)	5:53
5.	"21st Century Common Man (Part 1)" (CD version only)	4:49
6.	"21st Century Common Man (Part 2)" (CD version only)	4:00
7.	"Vigour"	4:55

== Personnel ==
- Edgar Froese
- Christopher Franke
- Paul Haslinger
- Jocelyn B. Smith – vocals on "Tyger", "London" and "Smile"
