= Leroy Mokgatle =

South African ballerina

- Born: 1999 (age 26–27); South Africa
- Occupation: Ballet dancer
- Career
- Current group: Berlin State Ballet
- Former groups: Béjart Ballet; Ballett Zürich

Leroy Mokgatle (born 1999) is a South African ballerina. She is currently a soloist at the Berlin State Ballet in Germany. She previously danced with Béjart Ballet and Ballett Zürich.

== Early life and training ==
Mokgatle was born in South Africa and, as a transgender woman, she had been assigned male at birth. Her mother died when Mokgatle was seven years old, at which time she was raised by her grandparents and members of her extended family.

She began taking ballet classes when she was eight years old through a program at her school. She attended the Art of Motion School in Johannesburg.

In 2014, she won the Youth America Grand Prix finals and, in 2015, she won gold and was the recipient of the Margot Fonteyn Audience Choice Award at the Genée International Ballet Competition. In 2016, she danced Solo for Diego at the Prix de Lausanne, earning the Audience Choice Award and a scholarship to train at The National Ballet Academy of Amsterdam. It was the first time a South African had placed at the Prix de Lausanne since Ann Wixley in 1988.

== Career ==
Mokgatle moved to Switzerland and joined Béjart Ballet in Lausanne in 2019. While in the company at Béjart Ballet, she began training en pointe and learning traditionally female-gendered choreography under the artistic director Gil Roman. During the COVID-19 pandemic, she was cast in an online revival of La Porte, a solo originally choreographed by Maurice Béjart for Maïna Gielgud in 1970. After that, Mokgatle began dancing female roles with the company more regularly.

In 2022, Mokgatle joined Ballett Zürich, having auditioned for the company performing both male and female technique.

In 2023, she was followed artistic director Christian Spuck from Ballett Zürich to Berlin State Ballet in Germany, becoming a member of the corps de ballet there and making her debut in December 2023 as the Fairy of Wisdom in The Sleeping Beauty. In her first season with the Berlin State Ballet, she also danced in William Forsythe's Approximate Sonata 2016 and Blake Works I. In 2024, she was promoted to the rank of demi-soloist. Mokgatle's repertoire at Berlin State Ballet includes Fearful Symmetries, Symphony in C, Wunderkammer, Swan Lake, and A Midsummer Night's Dream.
