= HMS Donovan =

Two ships of the Royal Navy have borne the name HMS Donovan:

- HMS Donovan (1918) was a 24-class sloop launched in 1918 and sold in 1922.
- HMS Donovan was a landing ship, infantry, built as Cape Berkeley, but renamed HMS Empire Battleaxe before being launched in 1943. She was renamed HMS Donovan in 1945, the name reverting to Empire Battleaxe in 1946, before she was returned to the US Navy in 1947.
