= Fearful Symmetry =

Fearful Symmetry is a phrase from William Blake's poem "The Tyger" (Tyger, tyger, burning bright / In the forests of the night, / What immortal hand or eye / Could frame thy fearful symmetry?). It has been used as the name of a number of other works:

== Film and television ==
- Tales That Witness Madness refers to poem in the first of the horror anthology stories called Mr Tiger. The child specifically asks his invisible Tiger what "fearful symmetry" means as well as stated that the poem is his favourite.
- "Fearful Symmetry" (The X-Files), an episode of The X-Files
- "Fearful Symmetry", an episode of the animated television series Justice League Unlimited
- Fearful Symmetry, a 1998 documentary on the making of To Kill a Mockingbird
- "Fearful Symmetry", an episode of the television series Lewis
- "Fearful Symmetry", a 2011 episode of the television series Endgame
- "Fearful Symmetry," a 2020 episode of the tabletop role-playing series Dimension 20, in its Fantasy High: Sophomore Year season
- "Fearful Symmetry" is the password to enter Tiger Bar in "The Russians? Exactly, the Soviets.", an episode of Neo Yokio

== Music ==
- Fearful Symmetry (album), a 1986 album by Daniel Amos
- Fearful Symmetry, a band headed by Jimmy P. Brown II of Deliverance
- "Fearful Symmetry", a 1990 album by Box of Chocolates, a group that included Will Oldham
- "Fearful Symmetry", a 1991 song by band This Ascension

== Print ==
- Fearful Symmetry, a book by mathematician Ian Stewart
- Fearful Symmetry (Frye), a work of Blake scholarship by Northrop Frye
- Fearful Symmetry, a popular science book by physicist Anthony Zee
- Fearful Symmetry, a 2008 novel in the Star Trek: Deep Space Nine relaunch series
- Fearful Symmetry, the fifth issue of the comic book Watchmen by Alan Moore
- Fearful Symmetry, an alternate title for the Spider-Man graphic novel Kraven's Last Hunt
- Fearful Symmetry, a short story by Sherman Alexie, included in his book War Dances
- Fearful Symmetry, an issue of the comic book Hellboy and the B.P.R.D. 1957

== Other ==
- "Fearful Symmetry", a difficult ice climb in the Canadian Rockies
- FearfulSymmetry.net, the website of novelist Dan Wells

== See also ==
- Her Fearful Symmetry, a novel by Audrey Niffenegger
- Fearful Symmetries (disambiguation)
