= Fearful Symmetry (album) =

Studio album by DA
- Released: 1986
- Studios: 3-D Studios, Costa Mesa, California
- Genres: Post-punk, alternative rock
- Label: Frontline
- Producer: Daniel Amos

DA chronology
Vox Humana (1984)	Fearful Symmetry (1986)	Darn Floor - Big Bite (1987)

Professional ratings
Review scores
Source	Rating
AllMusic	link

Fearful Symmetry is the seventh studio album by Christian alternative rock band Daniel Amos, issued on Frontline Records in 1986. It is the fourth and final album in their ¡Alarma! Chronicles album cycle and the first of three albums the band issued under the shortened moniker DA.

== Background ==
Fearful Symmetry is a lush, synthesizer driven pop album, lyrically wrapped in puzzles that the listener has to decipher. Nearly every song on Fearful Symmetry in some way deals with pain or darkness - from the William Blake-inspired "Sleep Silent Child", a song about death, to "Strong Points, Weak Points", a song about doubt. The album title comes from a line in The Tyger by William Blake. The album ends on an upbeat note however, with the touching ballad, "Beautiful One".

Fearful Symmetry was the final chapter of a four-part series of albums by DA entitled The ¡Alarma! Chronicles, which also included the albums ¡Alarma!, Doppelgänger, and Vox Humana. The band raised eyebrows on the tour that followed each release, by presenting a full multimedia event complete with video screens synchronized to the music, something that was unusual in the early 1980s for any band. This album, along with the other three albums from the Alarma! Chronicles was re-released as part of the Alarma! Chronicles Book set in 2000. The Book Set included three CDs, over 200 pages of lyrics, photos, liner notes, essays, interviews and other information in a hardcover book.

As with Vox Humana, keyboardist Rob Watson was unavailable for the photo session for this album. Thus, the album's group photo only shows four of the five band members.

== Track listing ==
Side one

1. "A Sigh for You" (words by Taylor, music by Taylor/Flesch/Chandler)
2. "The Pool" (words by Taylor, music by Taylor/Flesch/Chandler)
3. "Sleep, Silent Child" (words by Taylor, music by Taylor/Flesch/Chandler)
4. "Neverland Ballroom" (words by Taylor, music by Taylor/Flesch/Chandler)
5. "Strong Points, Weak Points" (words by Taylor, music by Taylor/Flesch/Chandler)

Side two

1. "Instruction Through Film" (words by Taylor, music by Taylor/Flesch/Chandler)
2. "When Moonlight Sleeps (On the Frosted Hill)" (Taylor)
3. "Sudden Heaven" (words by Taylor, music by Taylor/Flesch)
4. "Shadow Catcher" (words by Taylor, music by Taylor/Chandler)
5. "Beautiful One" (Taylor)

== Personnel ==
- Tim Chandler – bass guitar
- Greg Flesch – guitar
- Ed McTaggart – drums
- Terry Scott Taylor – rhythm guitars, lead vocals, harmonica, synthesizer
- Rob Watson – keyboards

Additional musicians

- Jerry Chamberlain – background vocals, narrator on "Instruction Thru Film"
- Doug Doyle, Dave Hackbarth – synthesizer treatments
- Crystal Lewis – background vocals
- Alex MacDougall – percussion

Production

- Recorded and Mixed by Terry Taylor, Doug Doyle & Dave Hackbarth.
- Recorded at 3-D studios, Costa Mesa, California.
- Mastered by John Matousek at Hitsville, Los Angeles, California.
- All Arrangements by DA.
- Cover Concept by DA.
- Photography by Derrill Bazzy.
- Photographics by Derrill Bazzy & Ken Baley.
- Band Photos by Linda Dillon Baley.
- Art Direction and Layout by Mr. Ed (McTaggart).
- Alarma! Chronicles Book Text Written by Terry Taylor and Greg Flesch. Also continued Thanks to Phillips Mangano for encouragement and inspiration.
