= Darn Floor-Big Bite =

Darn Floor - Big Bite

Studio album by Da
- Released: 1987
- Studios: 3-D Studios, Costa Mesa, California
- Genre: Alternative rock
- Label: Frontline Records
- Producer: Daniel Amos

Da chronology
| Fearful Symmetry (1986) | Darn Floor - Big Bite (1987) | Kalhöun (1991) |

Darn Floor - Big Bite is the eighth studio album by Christian alternative rock band Daniel Amos, issued on Frontline Records in 1987. It is their first album following the completion of their ¡Alarma! Chronicles album cycle, and was issued under their shortened moniker Da.

== Background ==
Daniel Amos followed the ¡Alarma! Chronicles four-part album series with this release, the title of which came from an incident involving Koko the gorilla, who had been trained to understand limited amounts of American Sign Language. Koko reacted to an earthquake with the words, "Darn darn floor bad bite. Trouble trouble."

Professional ratings
Review scores
| Source | Rating |
|---|---|
| AllMusic | 4.5/5 stars |

== Reissue ==
Darn Floor - Big Bite was remastered and re-released in 2008 by Arena Rock Recording Co. in conjunction with Stunt Records, featuring additional tracks and bonus material.

== Track listing ==
=== Side one ===
1. "Return of the Beat Menace" (Words by Taylor, Music by Taylor, Flesch, Chandler) – 2:56
2. "Strange Animals" (Words by Taylor, Music by Taylor, Flesch, Chandler) – 3:11
3. "Darn Floor - Big Bite" (Words by Taylor, Music by Taylor, Flesch, Chandler) – 4:22
4. "Earth Household" (Words by Taylor, Music by Taylor, Flesch, Chandler) – 3:49
5. "Safety Net" (Words by Taylor, Music by Taylor, Flesch, Chandler) – 3:28

=== Side two ===
1. "Pictures of the Gone World" (Words by Taylor, Music by Taylor, Flesch, Chandler) – 2:47
2. "Divine Instant" (Words by Taylor, Music by Taylor, Flesch, Chandler) – 3:51
3. "Half Light, Epoch and Phase" (Words by Taylor, Music by Taylor, Flesch, Chandler) – 4:15
4. "The Unattainable Earth" (Words by Taylor, Music by Taylor, Flesch, Chandler) – 3:42
5. "The Shape of Air" (Taylor) – 3:25

=== Deluxe edition bonus disc ===
1. "The Unattainable Earth"
2. "Return the Beat Menace"
3. "Safety Net" [Live at Cornerstone 1998]
4. Interview with Terry Taylor: Concept
5. Interview with Terry Taylor: Music with Cassette Demos
6. Interview with Terry Taylor: Lyrics
7. Interview with Terry Taylor: Recording
8. Interview with Terry Taylor: The Band
9. Interview with Terry Taylor: Looking Back
10. "Pictures of the Gone World"
11. "The Shape of Air" [Live at Cornerstone 2000]
12. "Half Light, Epoch and Phase"
13. "Darn Floor-Big Bite" [Live at Cornerstone 1988]
14. "The Unattainable Earth" [Live at Cornerstone 1988]
15. "Sacred Heart"

== Personnel ==
- Tim Chandler — bass guitar and backing vocals
- Greg Flesch — lead guitars, pan flute, and squeeze box
- Ed McTaggart — drums and backing vocals
- Terry Scott Taylor — guitars and lead vocals

== Additional musicians ==
- Phil Madeira — lap steel and accordion on live versions of "Safety Net" and "Shape of Air"
- Alex MacDougall — additional percussion
- Andy Prickett — guitar on live version of "Safety Net"
- Background vocals on "The Shape Of Air" — Gene Eugene, Riki Michele, Debi Taylor, Maria Chandler, Mike Stand, Jeff Crandall, Ric Alba, plus those two friends of Gene's

== Production notes ==
- Engineered by Doug Doyle.
- Recorded and Mixed at 3-D Studios, Costa Mesa, California.
- Photography by Ed McTaggart and Dave Perry.
- Video by Dave Perry, Videocon Productions, Costa Mesa, California.
- Cover Concept by Da.
- Original Art Direction and Layout by Ed McTaggart
- Reissue design & layout by Tom Gulotta
- Remastered by Don Tyler
- Reissue Project coordinators: Greg Glover and J. Edward Keyes
- Special Thanks: All of our families, Jason Townsend, Eric Townsend, Rob Gray, Dan De La Isla, Tardon at Mr. Toads.
