= HMAS Moresby (1918) =

1918 24-class sloop-of-war

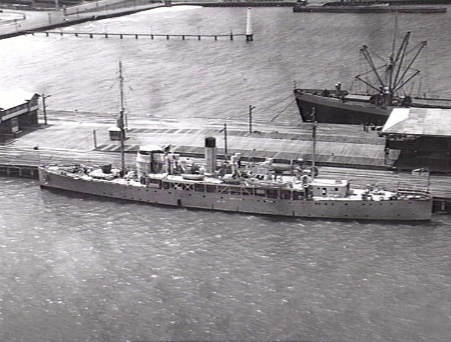
- HMAS Moresby in February 1940

History

United Kingdom
- Name: Silvio
- Namesake: Famous racehorse
- Builder: Barclay Curle, Glasgow, Scotland
- Laid down: 27 November 1917
- Launched: 12 April 1918
- Fate: Transferred to Royal Australian Navy

Australia
- Name: Moresby
- Namesake: Captain (later Admiral) John Moresby
- Commissioned: 20 June 1925
- Decommissioned: 21 December 1929
- Recommissioned: 27 April 1933
- Decommissioned: 14 December 1934
- Recommissioned: 11 April 1935
- Decommissioned: 14 March 1946
- Honours and awards: Battle honours: Pacific 1942-43; New Guinea 1943-44
- Fate: Sold for scrap on 3 February 1947
- Badge

General characteristics
- Class & type: 24-class sloop
- Displacement: 1,320 tons (as minesweeper); 1,650 tons (as survey ship)
- Length: 267 feet (81 m)
- Speed: 17 knots (31 km/h; 20 mph) as minesweeper; 14 knots (26 km/h; 16 mph) as survey ship
- Complement: 82 (as built)
- Armament: Peace: 1 × 3-pounder gun; War: 1 × 4 in (100 mm) gun; 1 × 12-pounder guns; 2 × 20 mm Oerlikons

HMAS Moresby (formerly HMS Silvio) was a 24-class (also known as Racehorse class) "Fleet Sweeping" sloop that served in the Royal Navy and Royal Australian Navy as a minesweeper, anti-submarine vessel, and survey ship. The ship was involved in both World Wars, and was the venue of the Japanese surrender of Timor on 11 September 1945.

== Design and construction ==
The 24 class were designed as minesweeping sloops capable of accompanying fleets on operations. As built, the vessels had a displacement of 1,320 tons, were 267 feet (81 m) in length, and had a standard ship's company of 82. The sloops were powered by coal-fuelled boilers connected to steam turbines. Although larger and roomier than preceding designs, the 24 class had a reputation of poor seakeeping capabilities.

The sloop was laid down as HMS Silvio, named after a British Epsom Derby-winning racehorse, by Barclay Curle at its Glasgow shipyard on 27 November 1917. She was launched on 12 April 1918, and commissioned into the Royal Navy on 25 May 1918.

== Operational history ==
=== Royal Navy ===
On 25 July 1918, Silvio, HMS Moresby, and three other warships were escorting a convoy when it came under attack by a U-boat off the coast of Ulster. All five escorts attacked the submarine, but none were successful in damaging it.

In 1925, Silvio was the last of five of the 24-class sloops to be converted to survey ships. In the same year, the ship was lent to the Australian Government to replace HMAS Fantome and assist HMAS Geranium in surveying throughout northern Australian waters, including a navigation channel through the Great Barrier Reef. The ship was renamed and recommissioned into the Royal Australian Navy as HMAS Moresby, after John Moresby, on 20 June 1925. She departed England on 28 June, and arrived in Australia in September.

=== Royal Australian Navy ===
Moresby participated in the Great Barrier Reef survey until 21 December 1929, when she was decommissioned into reserve in Sydney.

She was recommissioned on 27 April 1933, to perform urgent strategic surveys of the waters north of Australia. During the 1930s, conditions for the sailors aboard were a matter of contention. Survey work was already arduous, but the ship had not been designed for tropical operations, causing greater discomfort. In addition, the sailors had experienced reductions in pay. Over the course of mid-1934, the number of sailors reported for discipline had increased. These issues came to a head in the early morning of 19 August, when an able seaman punched a petty officer who admonished him for dirtying the ship's paintwork while attempting to move a crate, then insulted the seaman for dropping the crate when a support rope the petty officer was holding came loose. The able seaman was arrested and restrained in irons until the ship reached Darwin in two days time for a court martial. At breakfast, other sailors discussed the incident, with the idea of refusing the morning's call to work. Twenty-seven sailors ignored the bosun's call to work, and when confronted by the executive officer, said they were protesting against conditions and discipline aboard Moresby. After consultation between the captain and his officers, the sailors were informed that they would be charged by warrant (with their actions judged by the captain, instead of by a court martial). After returning to duty, the 27 sailors were later charged with "an act prejudicial of good order and naval discipline" and generally punished by the removal of merit and good-conduct badges. The Australian Commonwealth Naval Board felt that the captain's decision to charge by warrant was alarming, and felt the charges and punishment were an underreaction to what they considered an act of mutiny. After an inquiry into the incident, six of the sailors, plus a seventh who had incited but not participated in the protest, were discharged from the navy, and provisions were made to restore sailor pay levels.

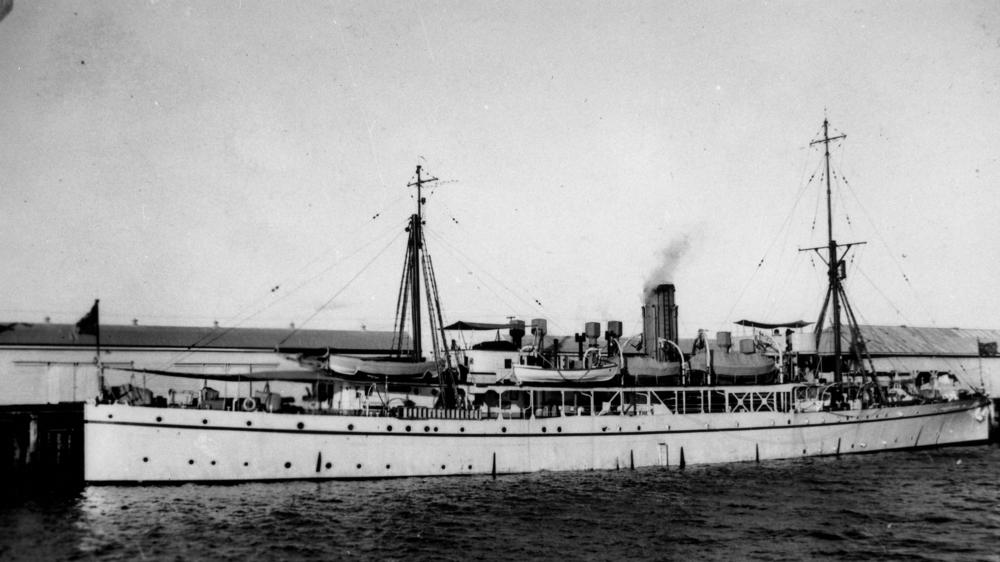
Moresby alongside at Bowen, Queensland during the 1930s

After the surveying exercises were completed, Moresby was returned to reserve on 14 December 1934 and her boilers were converted from coal to oil burning. Moresby was reconverted for survey work and recommissioned on 11 April 1935, returning to northern Australia until the beginning of World War II in September 1939. In May 1937, after the eruption of volcanoes of the Rabaul caldera resulted in the evacuation of Rabaul to nearby Kokopo, Moresby was sent to New Britain and instructed to provide any assistance necessary. The only need for the sloop was to transport provisions to the refugees.

During the first year of World War II, Moresby was used as an anti-submarine training vessel, a role she maintained until January 1941, when she was reassigned to survey duty in the waters of Australia and New Guinea. Following the Japanese attacks on the Allies in December 1941, the sloop was used as a convoy escort and anti-submarine vessel off the east coast of Australia. During the two years in this role, three of the convoys escorted by Moresby were attacked by Japanese submarines; December 1942 off Gabo Island with no damage, April 1943 with the sinking of the Yugoslav vessel Recina and the loss of 32 of her crew, and May 1943 off the New South Wales coast with SS Ormiston damaged but able to reach port. This two-year period saw the greatest Japanese submarine activity off Australia's east coast, with sixteen other ships sunk.

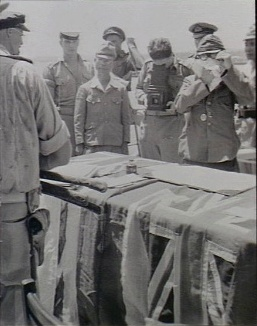
The Timor surrender ceremony aboard HMAS Moresby

In November 1943, Moresby was reassigned to survey duties, and spent the rest of the war based in Darwin. In September and October 1945, Moresby was assigned to a group of ships assisting the re-occupation of Timor. The Japanese surrender of Timor was performed aboard Moresby on 11 September 1945. Moresby earned two battle honours for her wartime service: "Pacific 1942-43", and "New Guinea 1943-44".

After the ceremony, the sloop was sent to survey Yampi Sound. On 4 October, a second mutiny occurred aboard Moresby. The overcrowded conditions (particularly when carrying passengers to the Timor surrender), difficulties of surveying work, tropical conditions, and bullying by the chief boatswain's mate (who had become the ship's disciplinarian after the master-at-arms departed at the end of World War II) were them main factors in the sailors' spontaneous decision to barricade themselves into their mess deck instead of reporting for exercises. Several senior personnel, including the captain, repeated the order to report with no effect, but when the captain ordered the mess deck door to be unbarred and opened, those inside did so. Moresby returned to Darwin and an inquiry was held: the spontaneity of the mutiny meant that there were no ring-leaders to identify and court-martial, so the decision was made to charge all the leading seamen involved with failure to report for duty (with ten days imprisonment followed by transfer to other ships), while the other sailors were given ten days stoppage of leave (an effectively meaningless punishment, as the ship left Darwin after the inquiry, and did not enter a port until after the punishment had expired). This was the last incident in RAN history where personnel were charged for mutinous acts.

== Decommissioning and fate ==
After completing the survey work, Moresby sailed to Sydney and was decommissioned into reserve for the final time on 14 March 1946, and was sold to BHP for scrapping on 3 February 1947. After being towed to BHP's Newcastle Steelworks, Moresby was cut down until there was only 2 feet (0.61 m) of freeboard. This 420-ton hulk was towed up the Hunter River, beached, and broken down into 30-foot (9.1 m) sections.
