= Fearful Symmetries =

Fearful Symmetries may refer to:

- Fearful Symmetries, a 1988 orchestral work by John Adams (composer)
- Fearful Symmetries, a 1999 novel by S. Andrew Swann
- Fearful Symmetries, a 2016 horror anthology edited by Ellen Datlow
- Fearful Symmetries, a ballet by Peter Martins

== See also ==
- Fearful Symmetry (disambiguation)
