= The Chimney Sweeper =

Two-part poem by William Blake

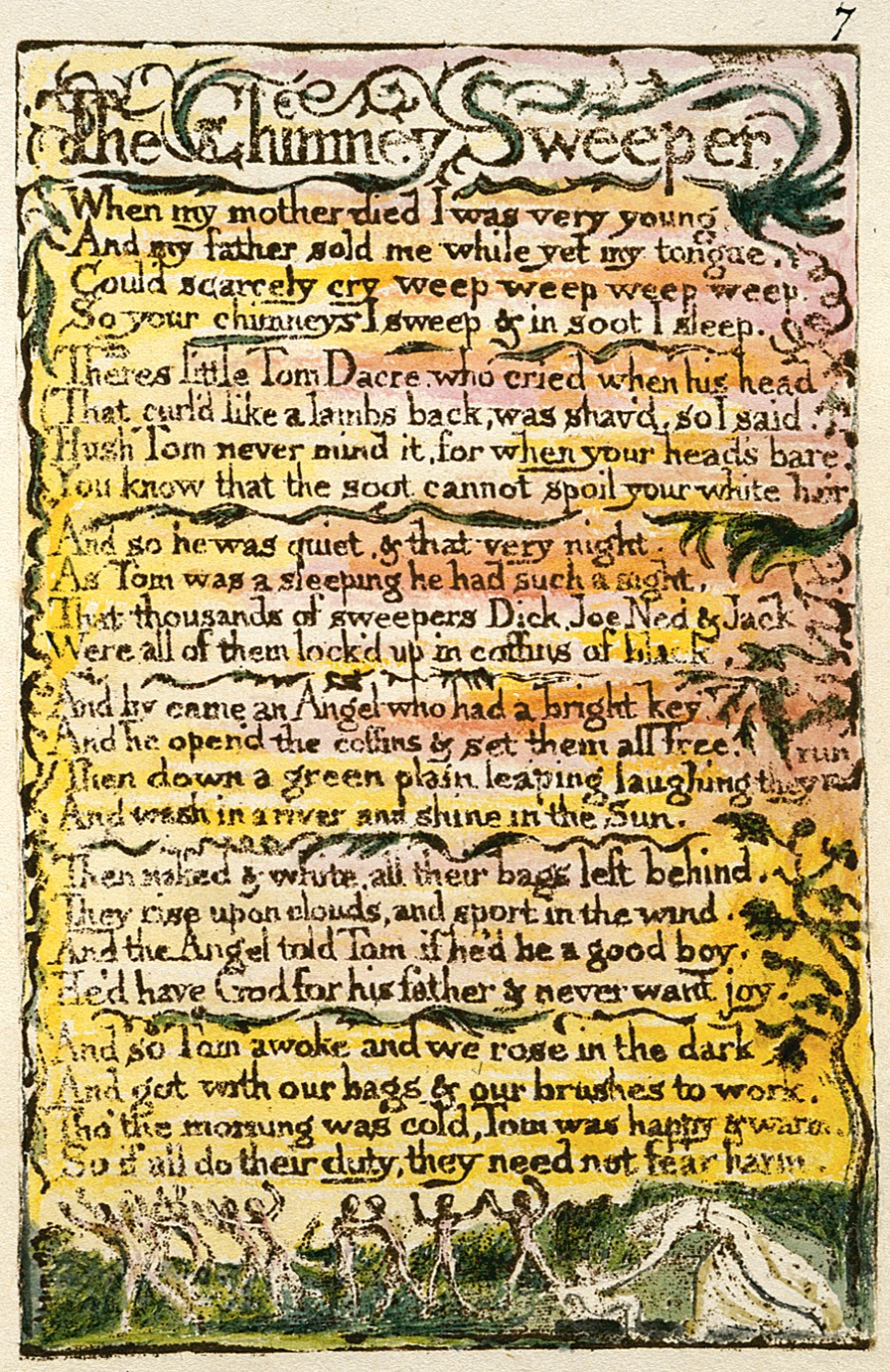
Copy L of "The Chimney Sweeper" in Songs of Innocence currently held by the Yale Center for British Art

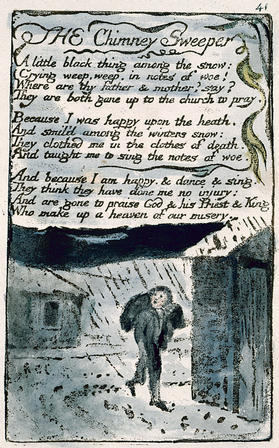
Songs of Innocence and of Experience, copy L, 1795 (Yale Center for British Art) object 41 The Chimney Sweeper

"The Chimney Sweeper" is the title of a poem by William Blake, published in two parts in Songs of Innocence in 1789 and Songs of Experience in 1794. The poem "The Chimney Sweeper" is set against the dark background of child labour that was prominent in England in the late 18th and 19th centuries. At the age of four and five, boys were sold to clean chimneys, due to their small size. These children were oppressed and had a diminutive existence that was socially accepted at the time. Children in this field of work were often unfed and poorly clothed. In most cases, these children died from either falling through the chimneys or from lung damage and other horrible diseases from breathing in the soot. In the earlier poem, a young chimney sweeper recounts a dream by one of his fellows, in which an angel rescues the boys from coffins and takes them to a sunny meadow; in the later poem, an apparently adult speaker encounters a child chimney sweeper abandoned in the snow while his parents are at church or possibly even suffered death where church is referring to being with God.

The poem from Songs of Experience was set to music in 1965 by Benjamin Britten as part of his song cycle Songs and Proverbs of William Blake.

== Poems ==
"The Chimney Sweeper" (from Songs of Innocence)

When my mother died I was very young,
And my father sold me while yet my tongue,
Could scarcely cry weep weep weep weep. (Note: The child's lisping attempt at the word "Sweep".)
So your chimneys I sweep & in soot I sleep.

There's little Tom Dacre, who cried when his head
That curled like a lambs back, was shaved, so I said.
Hush Tom never mind it, for when your head's bare,
You know that the soot cannot spoil your white hair.

And so he was quiet, & that very night,
As Tom was a sleeping he had such a sight,
That thousands of sweepers Dick, Joe, Ned & Jack
Were all of them locked up in coffins of black,

And by came an Angel who had a bright key,
And he opened the coffins & set them all free.
Then down a green plain leaping laughing they run
And wash in a river and shine in the Sun.

Then naked & white, all their bags left behind,
They rise upon clouds, and sport in the wind.
And the Angel told Tom, if he'd be a good boy,
He'd have God for his father & never want joy.

And so Tom awoke; and we rose in the dark
And got with our bags & our brushes to work.
Tho' the morning was cold, Tom was happy & warm,
So if all do their duty, they need not fear harm.

"The Chimney Sweeper" (from Songs of Experience)

A little black thing among the snow:
Crying weep, weep, in notes of woe!
Where are thy father & mother? say?
They are both gone up to the church to pray.

Because I was happy upon the heath,
And smil'd among the winters snow:
They clothed me in the clothes of death,
And taught me to sing the notes of woe.

And because I am happy, & dance and sing,
They think they have done me no injury:
And are gone to praise God & his Priest & King
Who make up a heaven of our misery.

== Analysis ==
In 'The Chimney Sweeper' of Innocence, Blake can be interpreted to criticise the view of the Church that through work and hardship, reward in the next life would be attained; this results in an acceptance of exploitation observed in the closing lines 'if all do their duty they need not fear harm.' Blake uses this poem to highlight the dangers of an innocent, naive view, demonstrating how this allows the societal abuse of child labor.

In Experience, 'The Chimney Sweeper' further explores this flawed perception of child labor in a corrupt society. The poem shows how the Church's teachings of suffering and hardship in this life in order to attain heaven are damaging, and 'make up a heaven' of the child's suffering, justifying it as holy. The original questioner of the child ('Where are thy father and mother'?) offers no help or solution to the child, demonstrating the impact these corrupt teachings have had on society as a whole.

== Gallery ==
Scholars agree that the "of Innocence" poem "The Chimney Sweeper" is the 12th object in the order of the original printings of the Songs of Innocence and of Experience and the "of Experience" version of the poem was 37th in the publication order. The following, represents a comparison of several of the extant original copies of the poem, their print date, their order in that particular printing of the poems, and their holding institution:

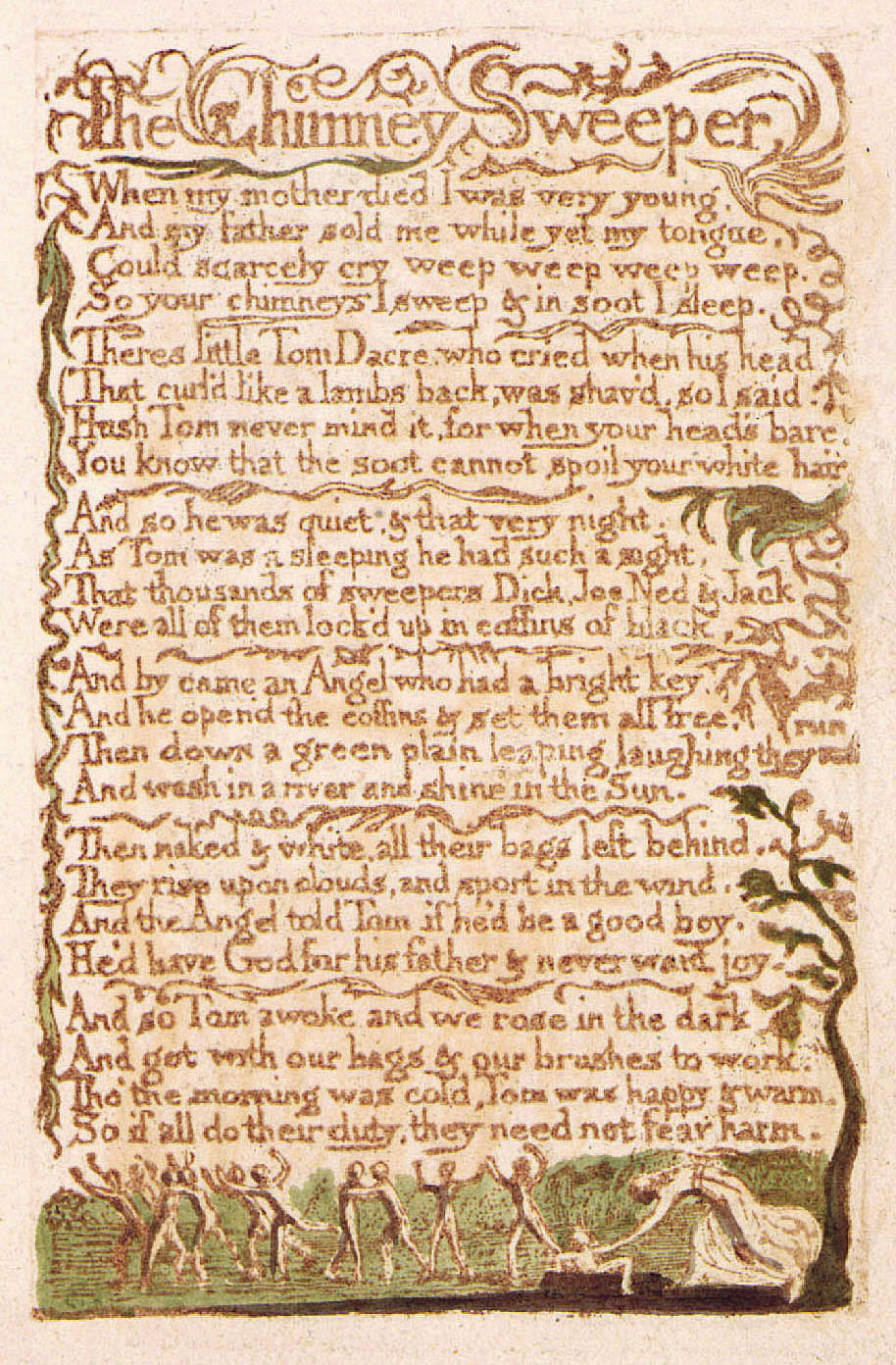
Songs of Innocence, copy B, 1789 (Library of Congress) object 16 The Chimney Sweeper

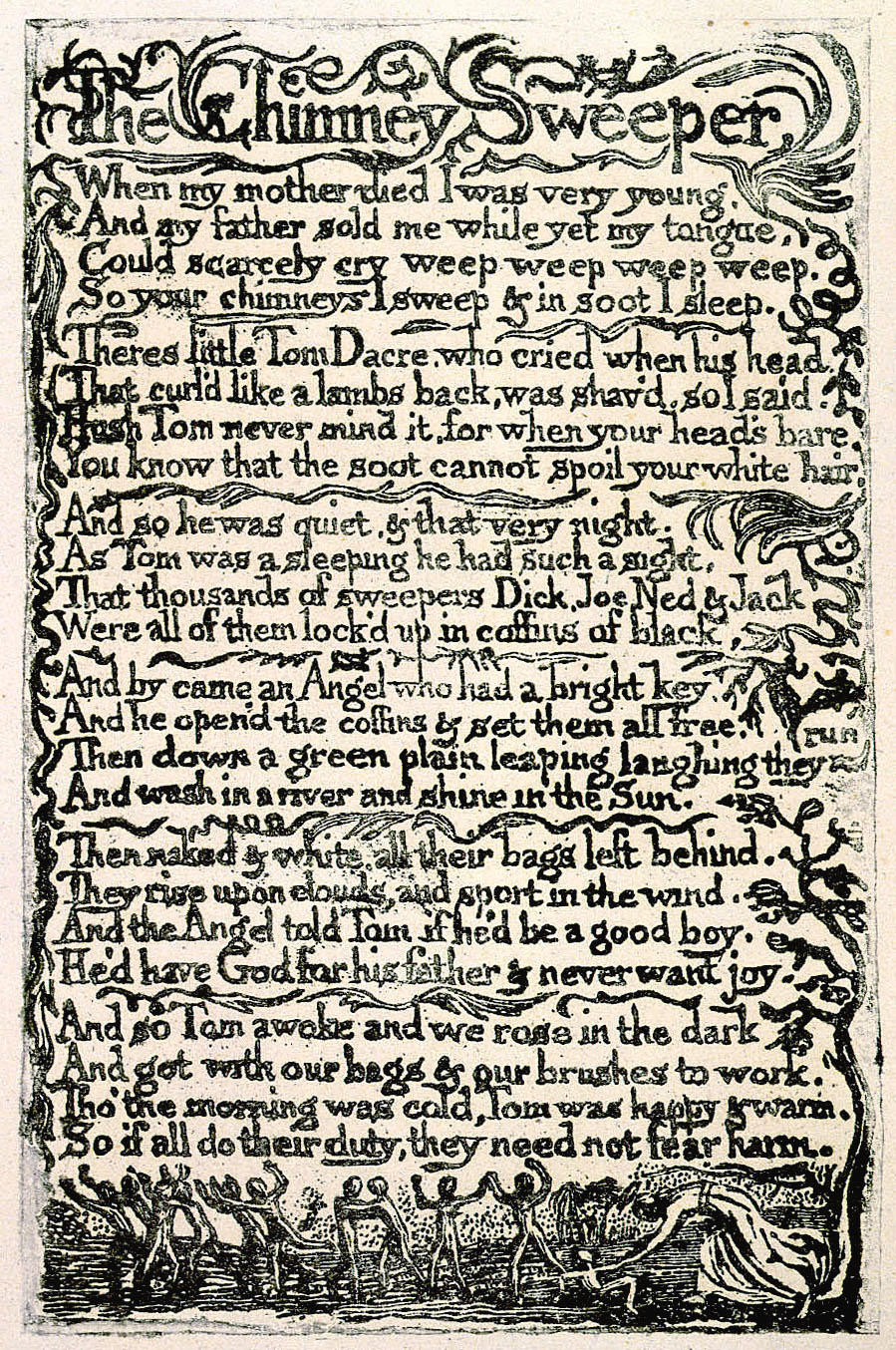
Songs of Innocence, copy U, 1789 (The Houghton Library) object 9 The Chimney Sweeper

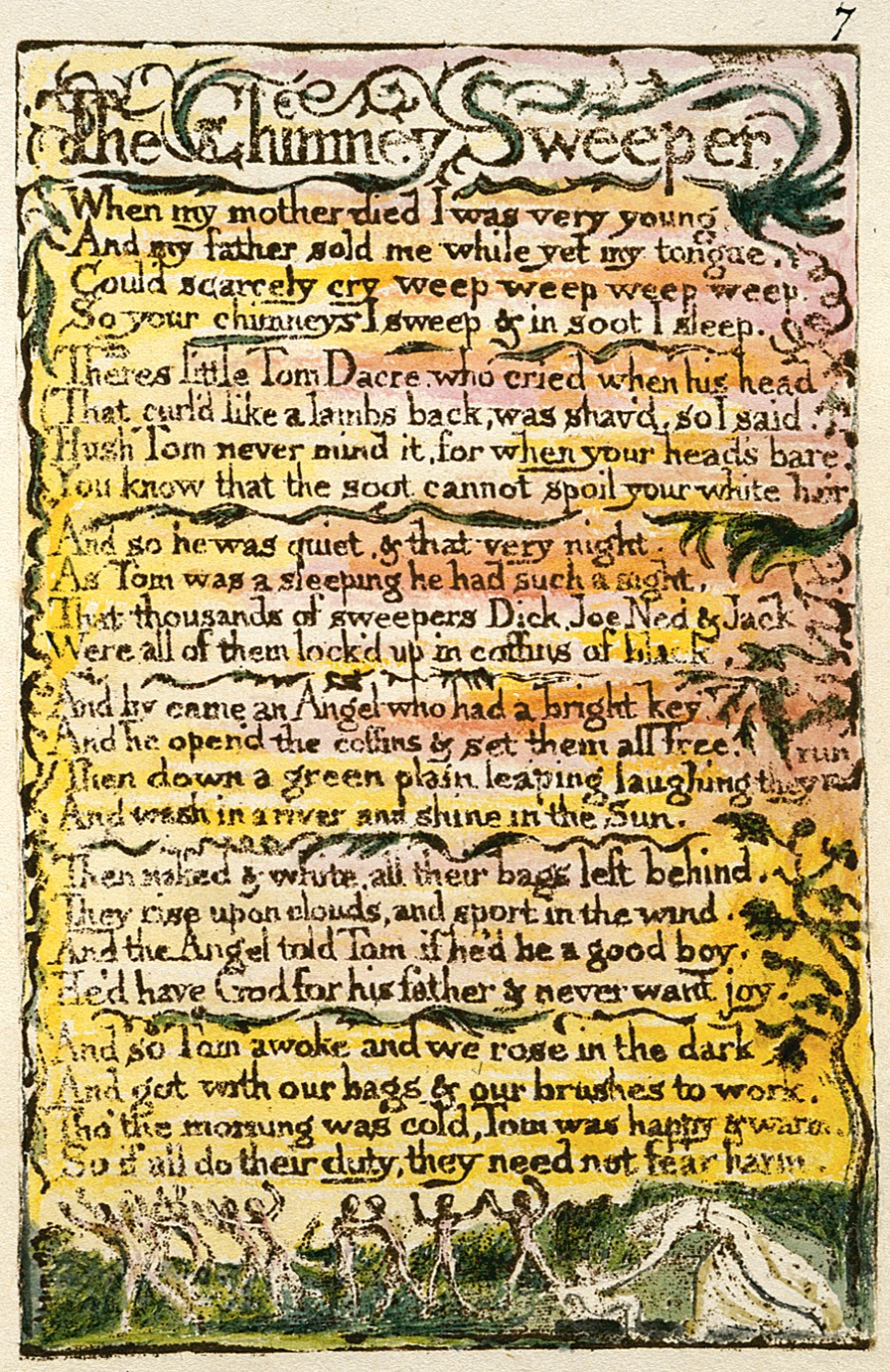
Songs of Innocence and of Experience, copy L, 1795 (Yale Center for British Art): electronic edition object 7 The Chimney Sweeper

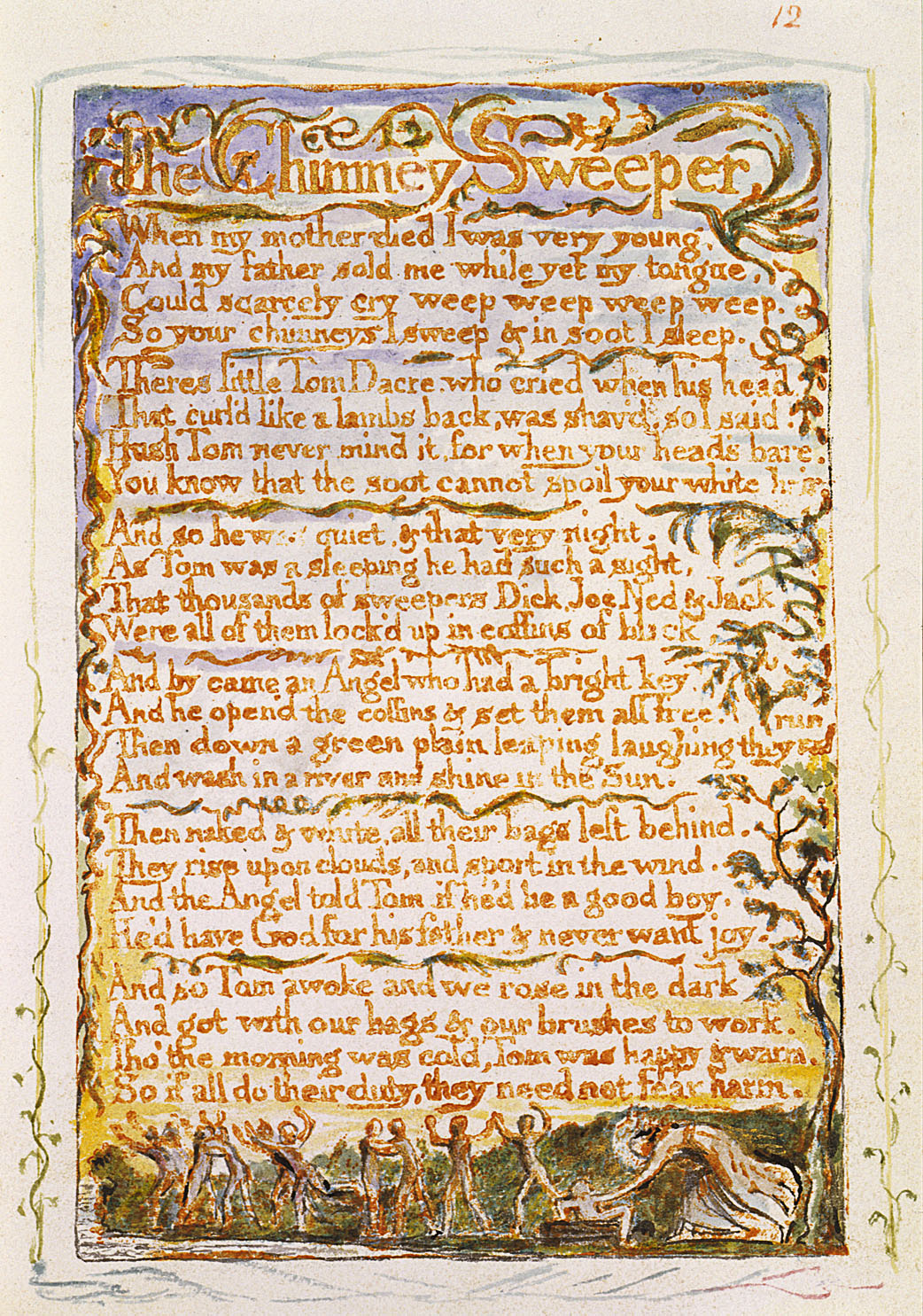
Songs of Innocence and of Experience, copy Y, 1825 (Metropolitan Museum of Art) object 12 The Chimney Sweeper

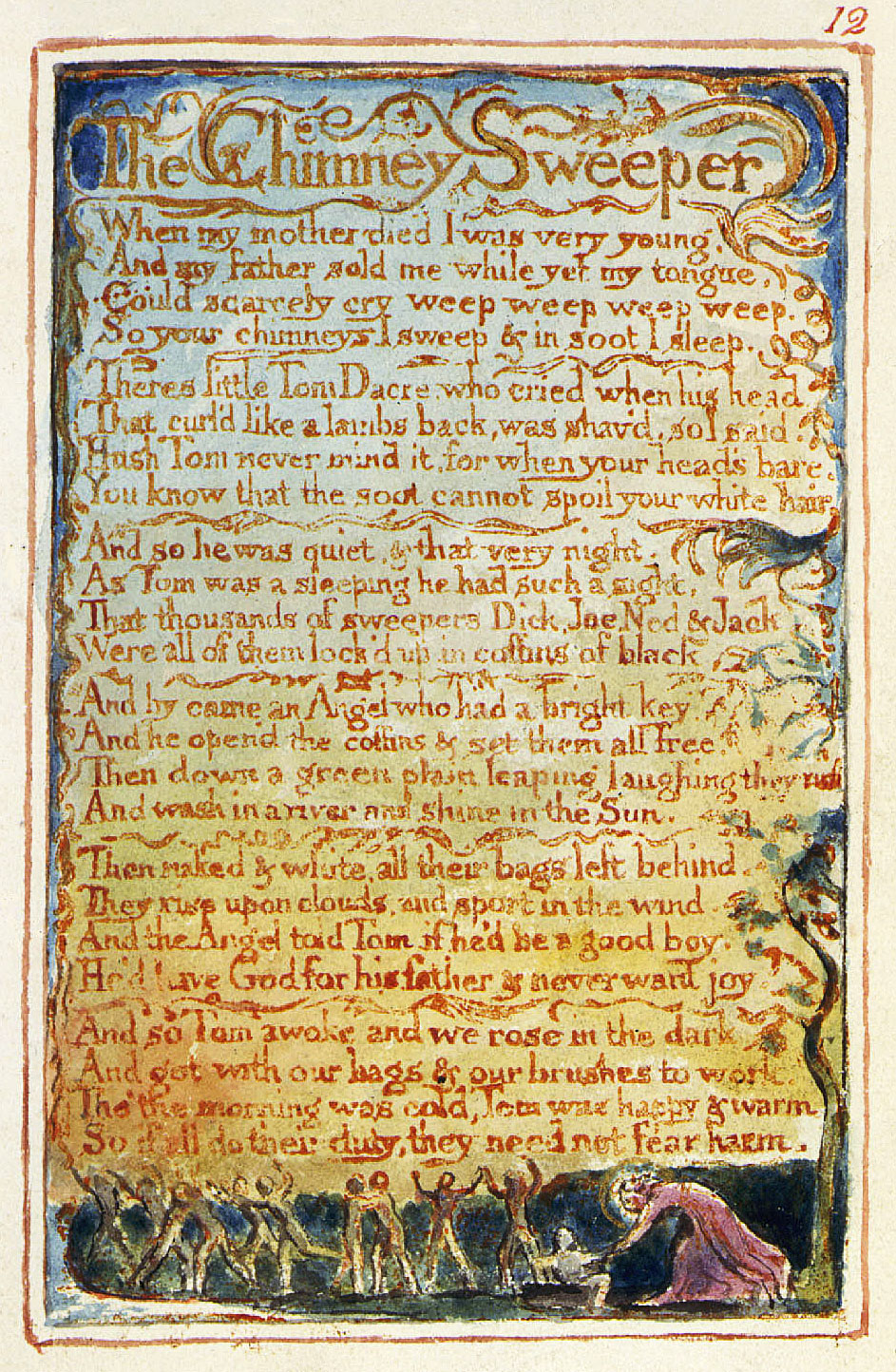
Songs of Innocence and of Experience, copy Z, 1826 (Library of Congress) Object 12 The Chimney Sweeper

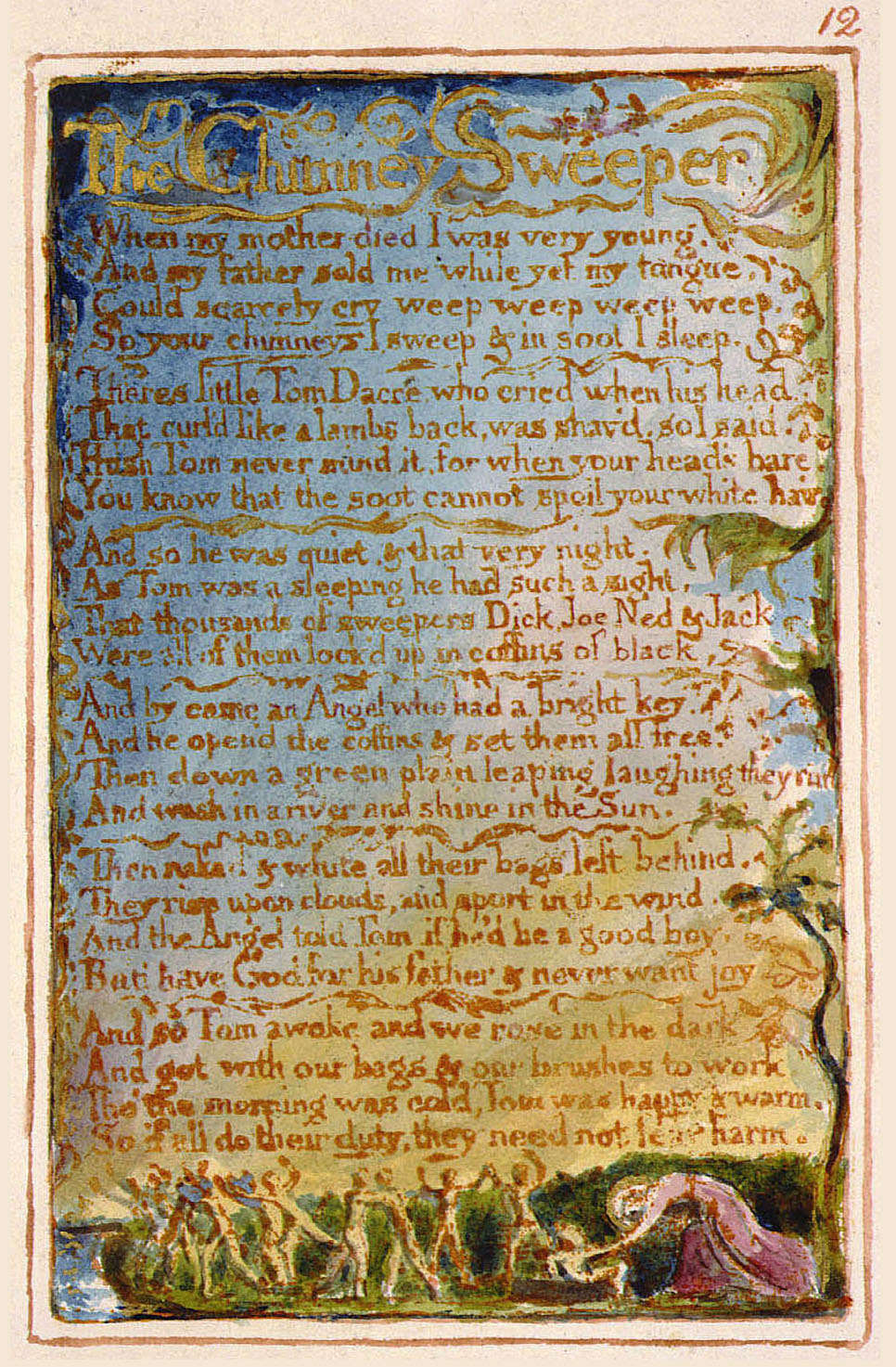
Songs of Innocence and of Experience, copy AA, 1826 (The Fitzwilliam Museum) object 12 The Chimney Sweeper

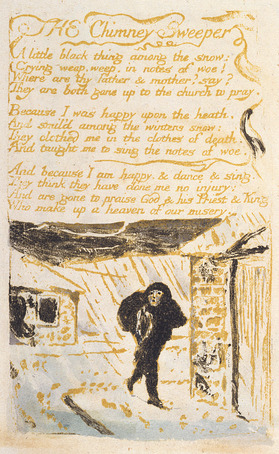
Songs of Innocence and of Experience, copy B, 1789, 1794 (British Museum) object 45 The Chimney Sweeper

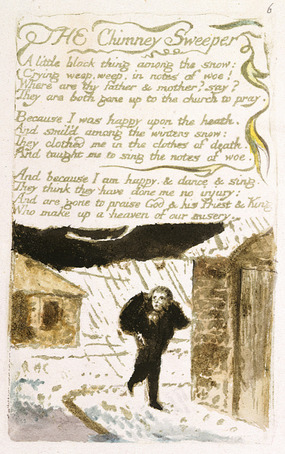
Songs of Innocence and of Experience, copy A, 1795 (British Museum) object 36 The Chimney Sweeper

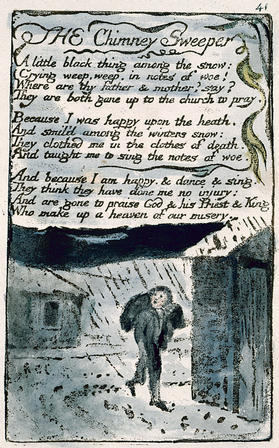
Songs of Innocence and of Experience, copy L, 1795 (Yale Center for British Art) object 41 The Chimney Sweeper

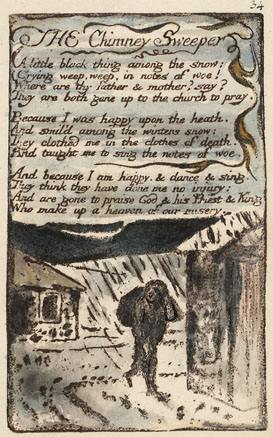
Songs of Innocence and of Experience, copy N, 1795 (Henry E. Huntington Library and Art Gallery) object 5 The Chimney Sweeper

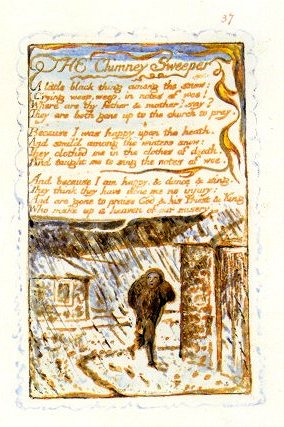
Songs of Innocence and of Experience, copy W, 1825 (King's College, Cambridge, UK) object 37 The Chimney Sweeper

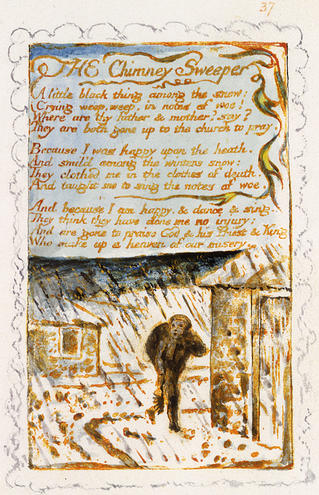
Songs of Innocence and of Experience, copy Y, 1825 (Metropolitan Museum of Art) object 47 The Chimney Sweeper

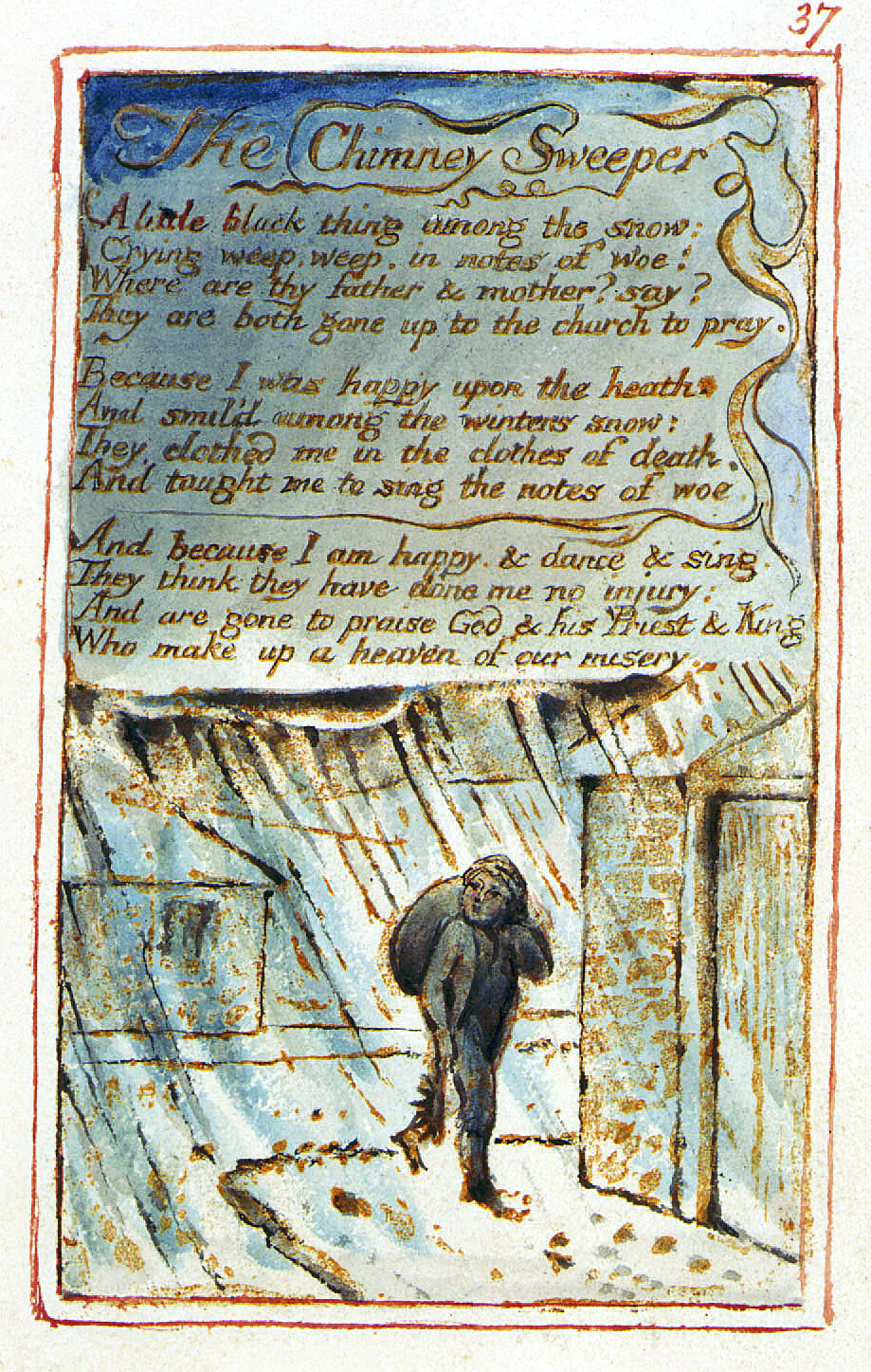
Songs of Innocence and of Experience, copy Z, 1826 (Library of Congress) object 37 The Chimney Sweeper

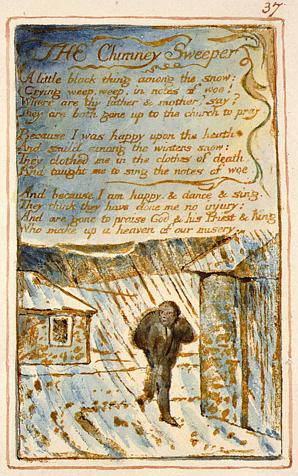
Songs of Innocence and of Experience, copy AA, 1826 (The Fitzwilliam Museum) object 37 The Chimney Sweeper
