= Fearful Symmetries (Adams) =

Orchestral composition by John Adams

Fearful Symmetries is a 1988 minimalist orchestral work by American composer John Adams. The piece incorporates electronic elements and employs a driving, constant tempo. Adams conducted the premiere of the piece in 1988 with the Orchestra of St. Luke's.

== Composition ==
As indicated by the title, symmetry is a constant feature of Fearful Symmetries, with nonstop four- and eight-bar musical phrases being propelled by a chugging rhythm. Adams incorporated a variety of styles and textures into the piece, including influences from techno pop and minimalist rock. The work employs a false ending, with a dramatic finale preceding a subdued final closure.

The title of the piece was extracted from "The Tyger," a 1794 poem by William Blake. However, rather than drawing inspiration from the content of the poem, Adams intended Fearful Symmetries to give the impression of traveling across an urban landscape. The piece is similar in style and instrumentation to Nixon in China, an opera Adams composed during the same period.

The work was premiered on October 29, 1988 by the Orchestra of St. Luke's under Adams.

== Instrumentation ==
Fearful Symmetries is scored for the following orchestra:

Woodwinds

2 flutes (both double on piccolo)
2 oboes (2nd = English horn)
2 clarinets
Bass clarinet
Bassoon
Soprano saxophone
2 alto saxophones
Baritone saxophone

Percussion

Piano
2 keyboard samplers
Timpani

Brass

2 French horns
3 trumpets
3 trombones

Strings (minimum number)

6 violins
6 violas
4 cellos
2 double basses

== Notable recordings and adaptations ==
The first recording of Fearful Symmetries was released in 1989, with Adams conducting the Orchestra of St. Luke's. In 2024, Marin Alsop recorded the piece with the ORF Vienna Radio Symphony Orchestra for an album titled Adams: City Noir, Fearful Symmetries & Lola Montez Does The Spider Dance. The album received a Grammy nomination for Best Orchestral Performance.

Fearful Symmetries has been adapted for ballet numerous times, with versions being choreographed for the Royal Ballet and the New York City Ballet.
