= Jocelyn B. Smith =

American jazz musician

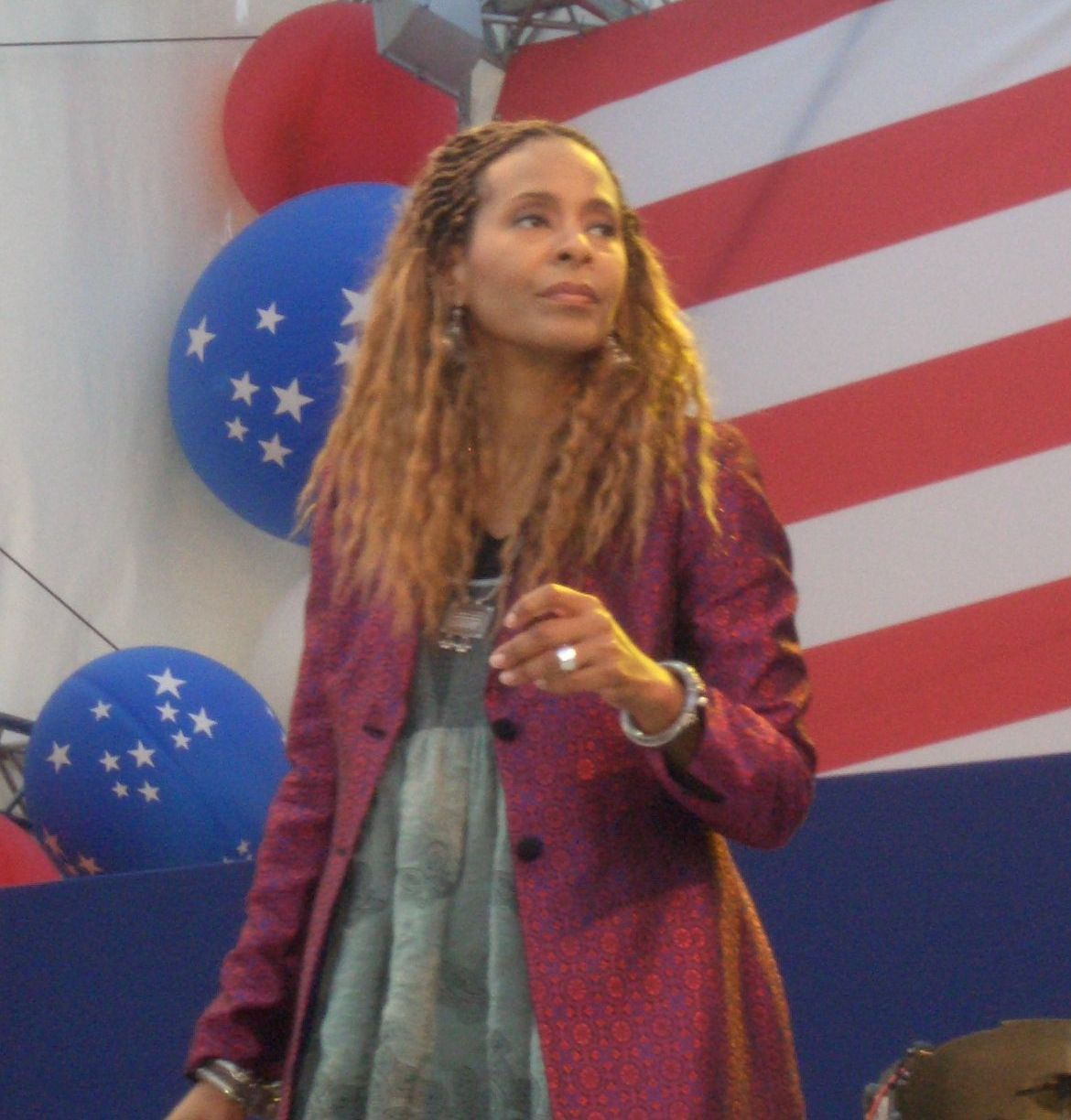
Jocelyn B. Smith at the opening of the new Embassy of the United States, Berlin

Jocelyn Bernadette Smith (born 22 August 1960) is an American jazz vocalist.

== Biography ==
Born in Queens, New York City, Smith received classical piano training from the age of 5. In 1980 she sang in Lenny White's funk / soul band Twennynine and went with her on a European tour. With the group Change she played in the opening act of the Electric Light Orchestra. In 1984 she moved to Berlin, where she made her first album River published 1991. In 1985 she made a guest appearance in the movie In the Desert in which she sang in the Berlin club Quasimodo. In 1987 she sang texts by William Blake for album Tyger by Tangerine Dream. In 1986/87 she was on a world tour with Falco as a backing singer. She toured from 1984 to 1996 with her band The Married Men through central Europe (incl. three GDR tours). In 1996 she also sang a duet with Udo Jürgens in his song "Gib niemals auf" on his album Gestern-Heute-Morgen.

In 1994 she sang the German version of the theme song from Disney's The Lion King. In 1997 she was the German voice of one of the Muses, Thalia, in Disney's Hercules.

In 1999, the composer Heiner Goebbels invited her to participate as a soloist in his work Surrogate Cities. She was at the premiere and subsequent performances in 2001 in Dessau, 2002 Edinburgh and 2003 in Brisbane, Australia and in Lucerne and Berlin – just like, for example, the Berlin Philharmonic. (Later performances were with the Royal Philharmonic Orchestra in Scandinavia and Italy.)

As soprano she appeared in Mikis Theodorakis opera The Metamorphoses of Dionysus, sang duets with Maria Farantouri and released the CD Margarita with his songs. At the Berlin commemoration of 11 September 2001 (which was broadcast around the world including CNN) she interpreted the hymn "Amazing Grace".

In 2006 she performed in a television production with The 12 Cellists of the Berlin Philharmonic. In 2008, she performed with Zülfü Livanelis at the Turkish Film Festival in Nuremberg and at the Frankfurt Book Fair.

She has shown social activism in her work with choirs. She offered free singing lessons in a Kreuzberg community and neighborhood center against poverty and social exclusion "Gitschiner 15". Since April 2008, with her music project "Higher Love" – children sing for children, she supports the Action Alliance landmine.de and advocates for a worldwide ban on cluster munitions and landmines. In July 2008 she founded the non-profit association Yes We Can e.V. which campaigns for the sustainable protection and assistance of victims of war children. Yes We Can e.V. is ambassador of beBerlin campaign of 2008.

=== Awards ===
For her CD Blue Lights and Nylons she received die Goldene Schallplatte in the category German Jazz in 2003.

== Discography ==
- River, 1991
- Born of Music, 1992
- Live in Berlin, 1997
- Blue Lights & Nylon, 1998
- Margarita, 2000
- My Christmas Experience, 2001
- Back to Soul, 2002
- The Faces of Jocelyn B. Smith – Her Very Best, 2003
- Secret Place, 2004
- Phenomenal Woman, 2004 (mit Till Brönner und Tony Lakatos)
- Berlin for New Orleans, 2005
- ExpressionZZ, Live, 2006
- Pure & Natural, Direct-to-Disc, 2013
- Here I Am 2013 / Blondell
- Boost Your Vocals 2014 / EP

=== Collaborations ===
- Lenny White: 29, 1980
- Tangerine Dream: Tyger, 1987
- Heiner Goebbels: Surrogate Cities, 1999 (mit David Moss)
- Eloy: The tides return forever,1994

=== Compilations ===
- Jo-Jo, 2003 (Zounds, alle Titel digital remastert, 24 Karat Gold-CD)
