= Musical setting =

A musical setting is a musical composition that is written on the basis of a literary work. The literary work is said to be set, or adapted, to music. Musical settings include choral music and other vocal music. A musical setting is made to particular words, such as poems. By contrast, a musical arrangement is a musical reconceptualization of a previously composed work, rather than a brand new piece of music. An arrangement often refers to a change in medium or style and can be instrumental, not necessarily vocal music.

Texts commonly used in choral settings include the mass and the requiem in Western Christianity, and the Divine Liturgy of St. John Chrysostom and the All-night vigil in Eastern Christianity. Examples include Mozart's Great Mass, and Leontovych's Liturgy of St. John Chrysostom.

A poem that has been set to music is known as an art song or Lied (German variant). Composers known for their art songs include Franz Schubert and Robert Schumann.

== Some notable settings ==
- George Frideric Handel's setting of Zadok the Priest (1721)
- Wolfgang Amadeus Mozart's setting of Ave verum corpus (1791)
- Franz Schubert's setting of Christian Friedrich Daniel Schubart's poem, Die Forelle, "The Trout" (1817)
- Giuseppe Verdi's setting of the Requiem Mass (1874)
- Hubert Parry's setting of William Blake's poem And did those feet in ancient time, also known as "Jerusalem" (1916)

== See also ==
- List of songs based on poems
- Church music
- Contrafactum
