= HMS Orby =

Minesweeper of the Royal Navy

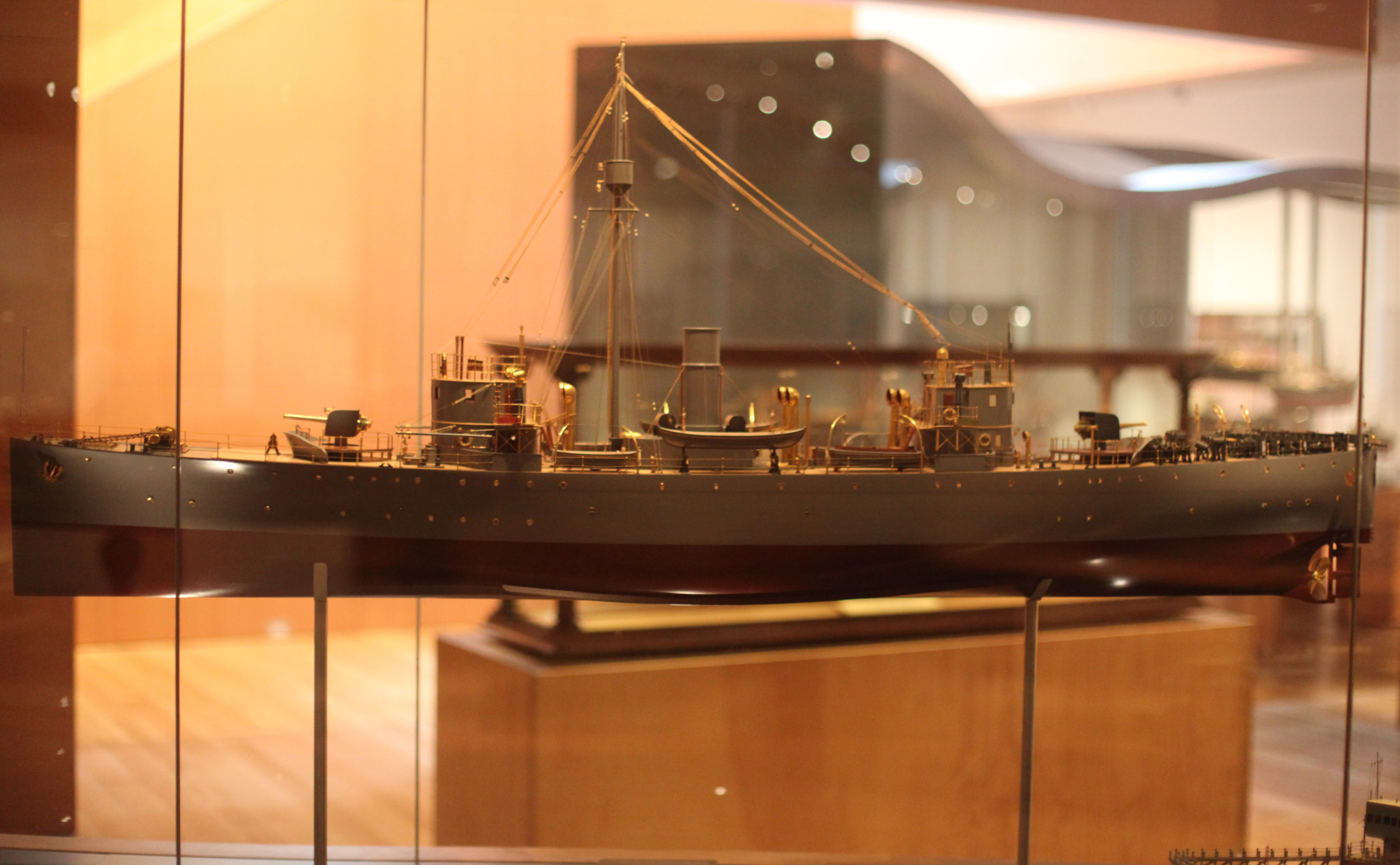
- Builder's model, Thomson Collection of Ship Models on display at the Art Gallery of Ontario

History

United Kingdom
- Name: HMS Orby
- Builder: Swan Hunter
- Launched: 22 October 1918
- Fate: Sold for scrapping on 15 November 1922

General characteristics
- Class & type: 24-class sloop
- Displacement: 1,320 long tons (1,341 t) standard
- Length: 258 ft (79 m) p/p; 267 ft 6 in (81.53 m) o/a
- Beam: 35 ft (11 m)
- Draught: 10 ft 6 in (3.20 m)
- Propulsion: 4-cylinder triple expansion engine, 2,500 ihp; 2 cylindrical boilers; 1 screw
- Speed: 17 knots (20 mph; 31 km/h)
- Range: 260 tons of coal
- Complement: 82
- Armament: As designed: 2 × 4 in (100 mm) guns; 39 depth charges

HMS Orby was a 24-class sloop of the British Royal Navy.
