= Kalhöun =

Studio album by dä
- Released: July 1991
- Studio: The Mixing Lab, Huntington Beach, California; Neverland Studios, Los Alamitos, California
- Genre: Christian alternative rock
- Label: BAI Records
- Producer: Terry Scott Taylor, Daniel Amos

Dä chronology
Darn Floor-Big Bite (1987)	Kalhöun (1991)	MotorCycle (1993)

Professional ratings
Review scores
Source	Rating
AllMusic	3/5 stars

Kalhöun is the ninth album by Christian alternative rock band Daniel Amos, released on BAI Records in 1991. It was issued under their contracted moniker dä and was their first album of studio material in four years.

== Background ==
Following the release of 1987's Darn Floor-Big Bite, Daniel Amos took a hiatus of several years as band members worked on other projects, such as The Swirling Eddies.

Kalhöun was released during a special release party that was thrown for fans and held at Cornerstone '91 by Stunt Records. Lead singer and songwriter Terry Taylor was at the party to autograph CDs for the fans that attended. Stunt Records' Tom Gulotta held a special auction of D.A. memorabilia - including early artwork for Taylor's solo album, Knowledge & Innocence, a promotional copy of The Swirling Eddies video "I've Got An Idea" and Arthur Fhardy's flowery shirt, which was torn off him during a rowdy performance by the Eddies at Cornerstone '90.

"If You Want To," was later rerecorded by Taylor's other band, the Lost Dogs for their 2004 album MUTT.

== Track listing ==
All lyrics by Taylor and music by Taylor/Flesch/Chandler except where noted.

1. Big, Warm, Sweet Interior Glowing (3:36)
2. If You Want To (Words and music by Taylor) (3:58)
3. Kalhoun (3:20)
4. I Will Return (4:18)
5. Tracking the Amorous Man (3:08)
6. Virgin Falls (4:14)
7. Gloryhound (4:40)
8. Prayer Wheel (3:39)
9. Note to Anna (Words and music by Taylor) (2:41)
10. Father Explains (Words and music by Taylor) (4:32)
11. Gate of the World (4:11)

== Personnel ==
- Tim Chandler — bass guitar
- Greg Flesch — guitars, accordion, B-3 organ, and violin
- Ed McTaggart — drums and percussion
- Terry Scott Taylor — rhythm guitars and lead and backing vocals

Additional musicians

- Dave Hackbarth trumpet
- Greg Kellog pedal steel guitar
- Mikes Tackett cello

Production

- Gene Eugene - engineer at Mixing Lab, Huntington Beach, California, mixing
- Additional recording at Neverland, Los Alamitos, California
- Terry Taylor - mixing Neverland Studios, art direction
- John Matousek - mastering at Soundworks West
- Court Patton - illustration, design and layout for Patton Brothers Design, El Cajon, California
- Court Patton - art direction
- Tom Gulotta - art direction
- Brian K. Tong - photography
- Ed McTaggart - film imaging for FMG Graphics, Newport Beach, California
