= A Poison Tree =

Poem by William Blake

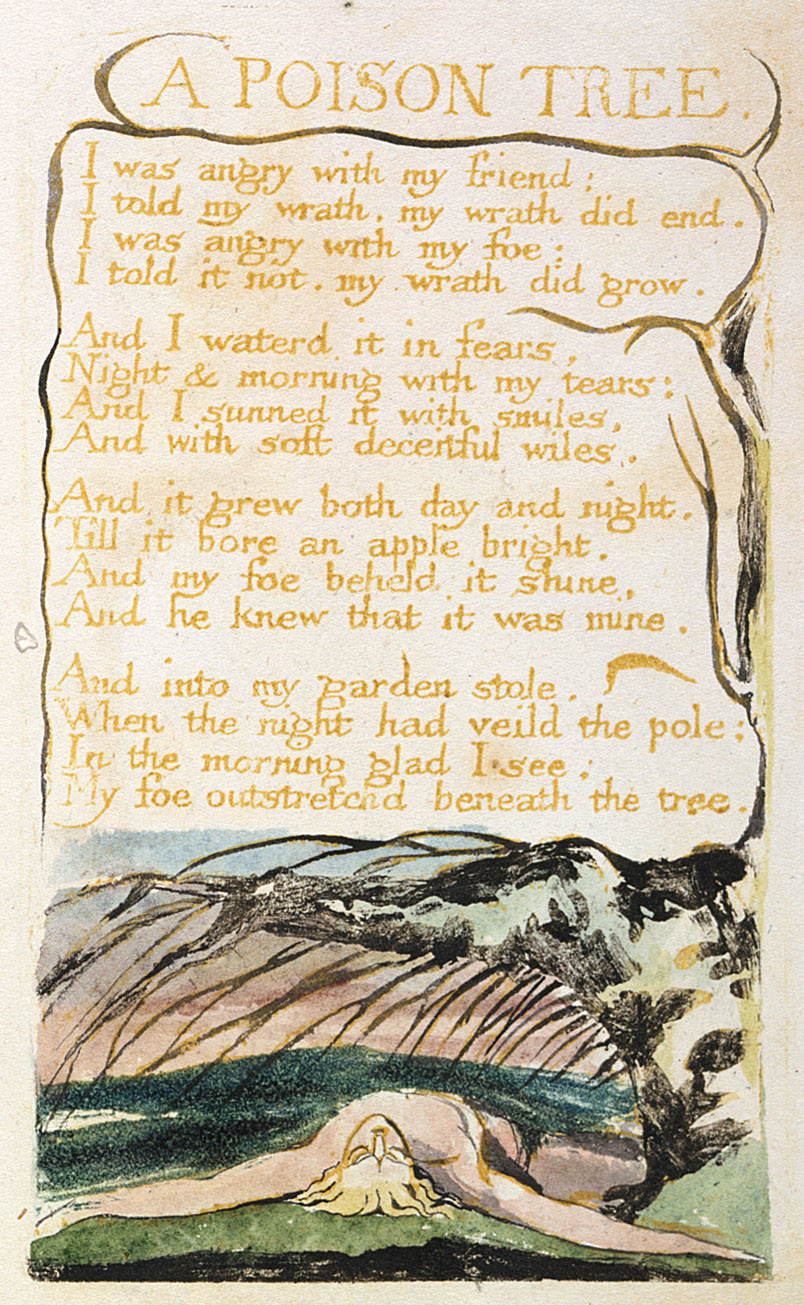
Hand-painted copy B of William Blake's "A Poison Tree", 1794 currently held at the British Museum.

"A Poison Tree" is a poem written by William Blake, published in 1794 as part of his Songs of Experience collection. It describes the narrator's repressed feelings of anger towards an individual, emotions which eventually lead to murder. The poem explores themes of indignation, revenge and, more generally, the fallen state of mankind.

== Background ==
The Songs of Experience was published in 1795 as a follow-up to Blake's 1789 Songs of Innocence. The two books were published together under the merged title Songs of Innocence and Experience, showing the Two Contrary States of the Human Soul: the author and printer, W. Blake featuring 54 plates. The illustrations are arranged differently in some copies, while several poems were moved from Songs of Innocence to Songs of Experience. Blake continued to print the work throughout his life. Of the copies of the original collection, only 28 published during his life are known to exist, with an additional 16 published posthumously. Only five of the poems from Songs of Experience appeared individually before 1839, with "A Poison Tree" first published in the 1830 London University Magazine.

The original title of the poem is "Christian Forbearance", and was placed as number 10 in the Rossetti manuscript, printed on a plate illustrated by a corpse under a barren tree. The body was shown similarly to the crucified corpse of Blake's "A Negro on the Rack" in John Gabriel Stedman's Narrative.

== Poem ==
The poem relies on a trochaic beat. It consists of four stanzas and begins with an emphasis on the first person.

The original draft has a line drawn beneath the first stanza, which could denote that Blake originally intended the poem as concluding at the 4th line. There are also many differences between the manuscript and published versions of the poem, with the original line 3 and 4 reading "At a Friends Errors Anger Shew / Mirth at the Errors of a Foe."

I was angry with my friend;
I told my wrath, my wrath did end.
I was angry with my foe:
I told it not, my wrath did grow.

And I waterd it in fears,
Night & morning with my tears:
And I sunned it with smiles,
And with soft deceitful wiles.

And it grew both day and night.
Till it bore an apple bright.
And my foe beheld it shine,
And he knew that it was mine.

And into my garden stole,
When the night had veild the pole;
In the morning glad I see;
My foe outstretched beneath the tree.

== Themes ==
The poem suggests that acting on anger reduces the need for vengeance, which may be connected to the British view of anger held following the start of the French Revolution. The revolutionary forces were commonly connected to anger, with opposing sides arguing that the anger was either a motivating rationale or simply blinded an individual to reason. Blake, like Coleridge, believed that anger needed to be expressed, but both were wary of the type of emotion that, rather than guide, was able to seize control.

Poisoning appears in many of Blake's poems. The poisoner of "A Poison Tree" is similar to Blake's Jehovah, Urizen, Satan, and Newton. Through poisoning an individual, the victim ingests part of the poisoner, as food, through reading, or other actions, as an inversion of the Eucharist. Through ingestion, the poisoned sense of reason of the poisoner is forced onto the poisoned. Thus, the death of the poisoned can be interpreted as a replacement for the poisoned's individuality. The world of the poem is one where dominance is key, and there is no reciprocal interaction between individuals because of a lack of trust.

The poem, like others in Songs of Experience, reflects a uniquely Christian sense of alienation. As such, "A Poison Tree" appears to play off the Christian idea of self-denial, and Blake may be relying on Emanuel Swedenborg's theme of piety concealing malice, which ultimately alienates the individual from their true identity and evil no longer appears to be evil. Blake's poem differs from Swedenborg's theory by containing an uncontrollable progression through actions that lead to the conclusion. The final murder is beyond the control of the narrator, and the poem reflects this by switching from the past to the present tense. The poem's theme of duplicity and the inevitable conclusion is similar to the anonymous poem "There Was a man of Double Deed".

The image of the tree appears in many of Blake's poems and seems connected to his concept of the Fall of Man. It is possible to read the narrator as a divine figure who uses the tree to seduce mankind into disgrace. This use of the fallen state can also be found in the poems "The Human Abstract" and "London" from the Songs of Experience series. The actual tree, described as a tree of "Mystery", appears again in "The Human Abstract", and both trees are grown within the mind.

== Reception ==
Samuel Taylor Coleridge, after being lent a copy of Blake's Songs of Innocence and Experience by Charles Tulk, annotated the lines of his copy with symbols representing the phrases "it gave me great pleasure" "and yet" "in the lowest".

An anonymous review in the March 1830 London University Magazine titled "The Inventions of William Blake, Paint and Poet", stated before discussing the poem: "let us continue to look over his notes, bright both with poetry and forms divine, which demonstrate an intimate knowledge of the passions and feelings of the human breast". After quoting the poem in full, the writer claimed, "If Blake had lived in Germany, by this time he would have had commentators of the highest order upon every one of his effusions; but here, so little attention is paid to works of the mind".

Ralph Vaughan Williams set the poem to music in his 1958 song cycle Ten Blake Songs. The poem was set to music in 1965 by Benjamin Britten as part of his song cycle Songs and Proverbs of William Blake.

Andrew Stauffer, in 2009, claimed that the poem is "Blake's best-known depiction of personal anger's destructive effects".
