= Vox Humana (Daniel Amos album) =

Studio album by Daniel Amos
- Released: 1984
- Studios: 3-D Studios, Costa Mesa, California
- Genres: New Wave, Christian alternative rock
- Label: Refuge
- Producer: Daniel Amos

Daniel Amos chronology
| Doppelgänger (1983) | Vox Humana (1984) | Fearful Symmetry (1986) |

Professional ratings
Review scores
| Source | Rating |
|---|---|
| AllMusic | 3/5 stars |

Vox Humana is the sixth studio album by Christian alternative rock band Daniel Amos, released on Refuge Records in 1984. It is the third album in their ¡Alarma! Chronicles album cycle.

== Background ==
Vox Humana was a much brighter album than its predecessor, Doppelgänger, and included catchy, synthesizer-driven pop songs with lyrics about technology's role in American culture. "Travelog" was a song about a television-obsessed man "basking in the blue light".

Danish author Søren Kierkegaard, Polish poet Czesław Miłosz, and Britons Malcolm Muggeridge and William Blake are all quoted in the liner notes of the album. DA also included a tribute to Blake with the ballad, "William Blake."

"Dance Stop", a song condemning nuclear arms escalation, asked listeners to dance to the song and stop suddenly when the word "stop" is sung. Due to the fast, upbeat punk rock style of the song, it is nearly impossible to follow the song's musical directions. The song went on to become a popular concert favorite for DA fans in later years, with audience members doing their best to follow the rule.

Vox Humana was the third of a four-part series of albums by DA entitled The ¡Alarma! Chronicles, which also included the albums ¡Alarma!, Doppelgänger, and Fearful Symmetry. The band raised eyebrows on the tour that followed each release, by presenting a full multimedia event complete with video screens synchronized to the music, something that was unusual in the early 1980s for any band.

== Tour ==
Although when the album was recorded, D.A. only had four members, guitarist Greg Flesch joined in time for the 1984 Vox Humana Tour. Though keyboardist Rob Watson was part of the band when the album was made, he was unavailable for the photo session due to being on tour with Petra. Leo Sorentino, road manager for The Choir, appeared on the album cover in Watson's place.

== Reissue ==
In 2016, Stunt Records revisited the album as part of its ongoing deluxe reissue series re-issued the album as a two-CD and a three-panel digipak.

== Track listing ==
Side one

1. "Travelog" (Taylor)
2. "(It's The Eighties, So Where's Our) Rocket Packs" (Taylor)
3. "Home Permanent" (Taylor)
4. "It's Sick" (Taylor)
5. "William Blake" (Words and Music by Taylor, Arrangement by Taylor/Chandler)
6. "Dance Stop" (Words and Music by Taylor, Arrangement by Taylor/Chandler)

Side two

1. "Live And Let Live" (Taylor)
2. "When Worlds Collide" (Taylor)
3. "As The World Turns" (Taylor)
4. "She's All Heart" (Taylor)
5. "The Incredible Shrinking Man" (Taylor)
6. "Sanctuary" (Taylor)

=== Deluxe edition bonus disc ===
1. "I Can't Resist You" [bonus track]
2. "The Man That Can't Be Mentioned" [`bonus track]
3. "Do Anything For You" [bonus track]
4. "Travelog" [acoustic mix]
5. "(It's The Eighties, So Where's Our) Rocket Packs" [raw mix]
6. "Home Permanent" [early mix]
7. "It's Sick" [rhythm mix]
8. "William Blake" [raw mix]
9. "Dance Stop" [karaoke version]
10. "Live And Let Live" [raw mix]
11. "When Worlds Collide" [solo acoustic]
12. "As The World Turns" [Doppelganger sessions demo]
13. "As The World Turns" [raw mix]
14. "She's All Heart" [raw mix]
15. "The Incredible Shrinking Man" [acoustic mix]
16. "Sanctuary" [Live at Flevo '85]
17. "Sanctuary" [solo acoustic]

== Personnel ==
- Tim Chandler – 4 and 12-string bass guitar, lead guitars, backing vocals
- Ed McTaggart – drums, percussion
- Terry Scott Taylor – rhythm guitars, lead vocals
- Rob Watson – keyboards, backing vocals, percussion

== Production notes ==
- Engineered by Doug Doyle.
- Second Engineer: Rob Watson with thanks to Bruce Swift.
- Arrangements: T.T. and the DA Boys.
- Recorded and Mixed at 3-D studios, Costa Mesa, California.
- Mastered at Motown, LA by John Matouchek.
- Art Direction, Layout and Graphics by Ed McTaggart.
- Album Art Concept: Terry Taylor.
- Photographics and Photography: Linda (Photo) Dillion Baley and Ken Baley.
- "Foot" art by Phil Yea.
- Special Hair Effects by Cathy Kern.
- "Boot" shadow by Gary DeLacy
- Reissue Produced by Tom Gulotta and Eric Townsend
- Alternate Mixes by Eric Townsend
- Remastered by J. Powell at Steinhaus
- Reissue Layout by Tom Gulotta and Eric Townsend
