= HMS Donovan (1918) =

Minesweeper of the Royal Navy

History

United Kingdom
- Name: HMS Donovan
- Builder: Greenock & Grangemouth Dockyard Company
- Launched: 27 April 1918
- Fate: Sold for scrapping on 15 November 1922

General characteristics
- Class & type: 24-class sloop
- Displacement: 1,320 long tons (1,341 t) standard
- Length: 258 ft (79 m) p/p; 267 ft 6 in (81.53 m) o/a
- Beam: 35 ft (11 m)
- Draught: 10 ft 6 in (3.20 m)
- Propulsion: 4-cylinder triple expansion engine, 2,500 ihp (1,900 kW); 2 cylindrical boilers; 1 screw
- Speed: 17 knots (31 km/h; 20 mph)
- Range: 260 tons of coal
- Complement: 82
- Armament: As designed: 2 × 4 in (100 mm) guns; 39 depth charges

HMS Donovan was a Royal Navy 24-class sloop.
