= London (William Blake poem) =

Poem by William Blake

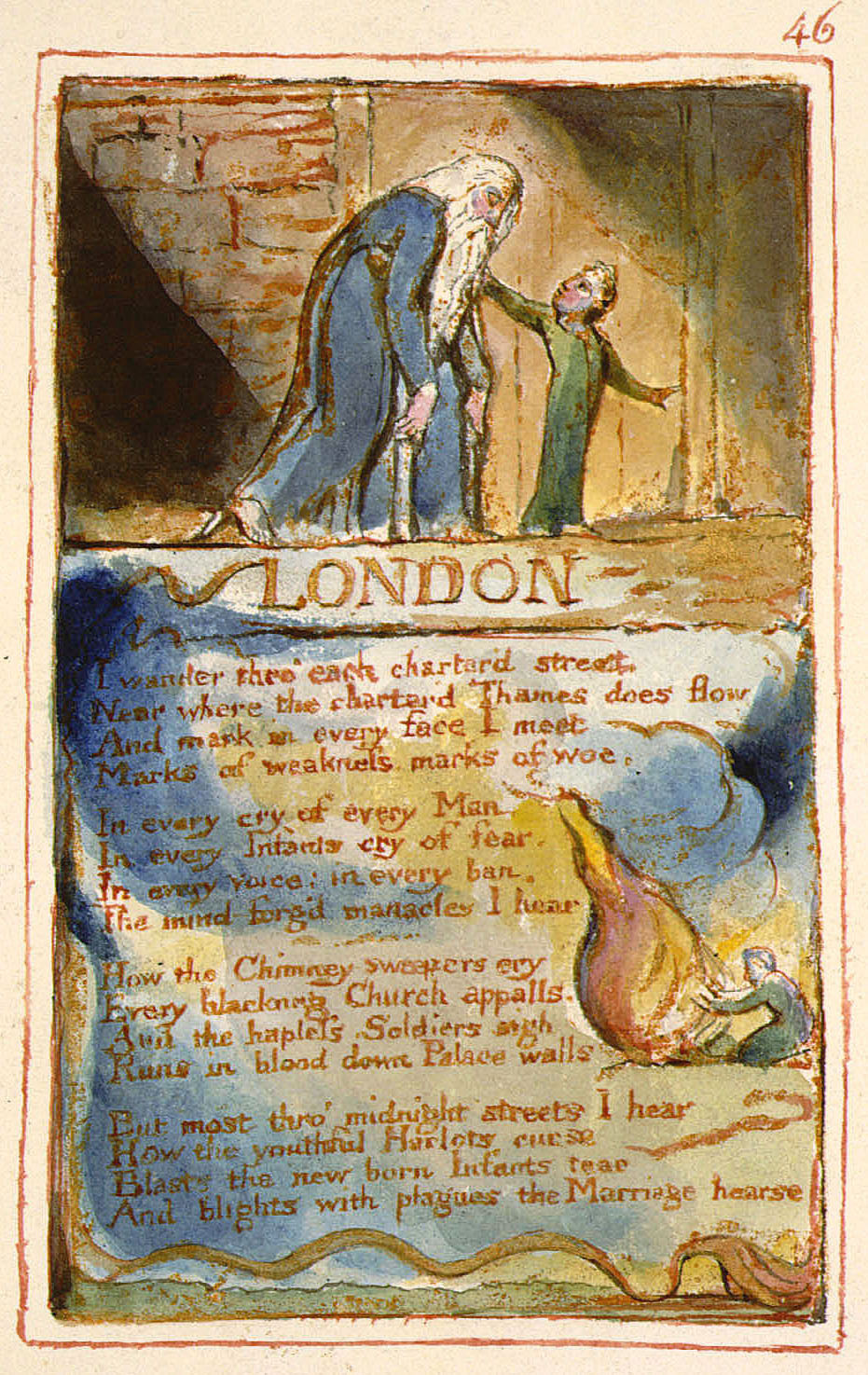
This image is a digital reproduction of his hand-painted 1826 print of "London" from Copy AA of Songs of Innocence and Experience. The item is currently in the Collection of the Fitzwilliam Museum.

London is a poem by William Blake, published in the Songs of Experience in 1794. It is one of the few poems in Songs of Experience that reflects a constrained or bleak view of the city. Written during the time of significant political and social upheaval in England, the poem expresses themes of oppression, poverty, and institutional corruption. Scholars have suggested that Blake used this work to critique the impacts of industrialization and to highlight the experiences of London's impoverished residents.

== Poem ==
I wander thro’ each charter’d street,
Near where the charter’d Thames does flow.
And mark in every face I meet
Marks of weakness, marks of woe.

In every cry of every Man,
In every Infants cry of fear,
In every voice: in every ban,
The mind-forg’d manacles I hear

How the Chimney-sweepers cry
Every blackning Church appalls,
And the hapless Soldiers sigh
Runs in blood down Palace walls

But most thro’ midnight streets I hear
How the youthful Harlots curse
Blasts the new-born Infants tear
And blights with plagues the Marriage hearse.

== Analysis of the poem ==
The poem is widely considered a social critique of London during the late 18th century. Scholars interpret Blake’s work as a reflection of his perception of the city's poverty, oppression, and inequality. According to literary critics, Blake’s “London” explores the idea of institutional corruption and the psychological toll on the working class. Blake's contemporary, the French Revolution, and the Industrial Revolution had impacted British society, and critics argue that Blake may have been influenced by these events. The poem is notable for its focus on themes like powerlessness, as suggested by the repeated imagery of "chartered" streets and the "mind-forged manacles" that suggest a sense of inescapable control over individuals. Through vivid and repetitive imagery, Blake portrays a society marked by oppression, particularly emphasizing how institutions like the church and the monarchy contribute to systemic despair. For example, Blake’s mention of the 'mind-forg’d manacles' suggests the psychological impact of societal restrictions on individuals (Zhan, 2013).

== Themes ==
The poem addresses themes such as social oppression, the loss of individual freedom, and the impact of industrialization on urban life. Blake uses these themes to critique the institutions he saw as perpetuating inequality and suffering in society, including the church and the government (Zhan, 2013; Thompson, 1993).

Blake critiques not only the societal structures but also the role of institutions such as the Church and the monarchy in perpetuating inequality. He draws attention to the suffering of marginalized groups, such as chimney sweeps, soldiers, and prostitutes, who bear the brunt of the city's moral and economic corruption. Through stark imagery like the "youthful harlot's curse" and "runs in blood down palace walls," Blake critiques the moral decay that spreads across generations, exacerbating the cycle of poverty and suffering.

== Literary techniques ==
Blake’s poem employs several literary techniques that are central to its effect:

- Polyptoton: The repetition of variations of "mark" in "Marks of weakness, marks of woe" emphasizes the pervasive suffering among the people of London.
- Alliteration: Examples like "mind-forged manacles" add to the rhythmic quality of the poem, highlighting key images.
- Structure: The poem follows an ABAB rhyme scheme in each stanza, reinforcing a feeling of order that contrasts with the chaotic content of suffering and despair.
- Repetition: The repeated use of "chartered" underscores the sense of pervasive control, according to literary analysts.

Blake uses repetition and stark imagery to highlight the oppressive atmosphere of London. For example, the repeated word ‘charter’d’ underscores the regulated, restrictive nature of city life, while other phrases convey a sense of entrapment and despair. His choice of structure and rhythm further amplifies the bleak tone of the poem (Erdman, 1988).

I wander thro’ each charter’d street,
Near where the charter’d Thames does flow.
And mark in every face I meet
Marks of weakness, marks of woe.

In every cry of every Man,
In every Infants cry of fear,
In every voice: in every ban,
The mind-forg’d manacles I hear

How the Chimney-sweepers cry
Every blackning Church appalls,
And the hapless Soldiers sigh
Runs in blood down Palace walls

But most thro’ midnight streets I hear
How the youthful Harlots curse
Blasts the new-born Infants tear
And blights with plagues the Marriage hearse

== Publishing ==
In Songs of Innocence and Experience, William Blake made deliberate alterations to the wording and arrangement of poems across different editions of his work, particularly in the first prints of 1794. This method reflected Blake's evolving artistic vision. These editions were unique in their hand-colored illustrations and in the presentation of both the text and visual elements, with no two copies being exactly the same, having the text etched onto copper plates. Scholars note that these variations can be seen in changes to the order of the poems and even in subtle differences in phrasing. The differing sequences reflect Blake's deep engagement with the themes of innocence and experience and how they were perceived over time.

London was published in Blake’s Songs of Experience in 1794, alongside other poems that explore themes of societal control and personal suffering. The collection, which was originally illustrated and printed by Blake himself, reflects his evolving perspective on social and political issues of the time (Bentley, 2004).

== Allusions ==
Blake's London contains several notable allusions that critique societal structures in 18th-century England, which Blake portrays as oppressive institutions. His use of several imagery conveys his criticism of both religious and governmental powers, suggesting they contribute to the suffering of the poor. One of the most prominent is the "Church" and its depiction as a "black'ning Church." The reference to the "black'ning Church" suggests that the church as an institution is not only physically blackening from the soot of London but is actually rotting from the inside, insinuating severe corruption. This phrase may signify Blake’s view of the church as an institution complicit in the suffering of the population, symbolically “darkened” by its failure to address social issues like poverty and child labor. Scholars suggest that Blake used this imagery to critique the church's alignment with oppressive structures rather than acting as a force for compassion and support in society (Frye, 1947; Thompson, 1993).

Another significant allusion is the reference to "Palace walls" running with blood. This line is interpreted as a criticism of the monarchy and the ruling class, whom Blake viewed as indifferent to the suffering of the common people. This imagery may evoke associations with the social unrest and revolutions occurring in Blake's era, such as the French Revolution, which Blake followed closely and viewed as a reaction against oppressive rule. The phrase suggests that the palace—or monarchy—is metaphorically "stained" with the blood of the oppressed, pointing to the exploitation and suffering endured by lower classes as a result of the monarchy’s policies (Erdman, 1988; Bentley, 2004).

Finally, the mention of the "Harlot's curse" and the "newborn infant's tear" evokes a cycle of suffering perpetuated across generations, implying that societal corruption affects both individuals and families, trapping them in a relentless cycle of despair. Scholars have noted that this line critiques the societal impact of poverty and the breakdown of traditional family structures in the face of industrial and urban pressures (Bentley, 2004). Blake’s use of these allusions underscores his critique of the moral and social decay he perceived in London’s institutions.

== Adaptations ==
The poem London by William Blake has inspired various musical interpretations, demonstrating its enduring influence across different artistic fields. Notably, Ralph Vaughan Williams adapted the poem in 1958 as part of his Ten Blake Songs, a cycle that reflects his approach to integrating Blake’s visual and poetic elements with musical composition. Similarly, Benjamin Britten incorporated the poem into his 1965 cycle Songs and Proverbs of William Blake, exploring the themes of oppression and corruption present in the work. Furthermore, the German electronic band Tangerine Dream released an album titled Tyger in 1987, inspired by Blake's poems, including London. This album reflects a more modern, experimental take on Blake's themes, showcasing how the poem continues to resonate with contemporary artists.
