= The Fly (poem) =

Poem by William Blake

"The Fly" is a poem written by the English poet William Blake. It was published as part of his collection Songs of Experience in 1794.

== Poem ==
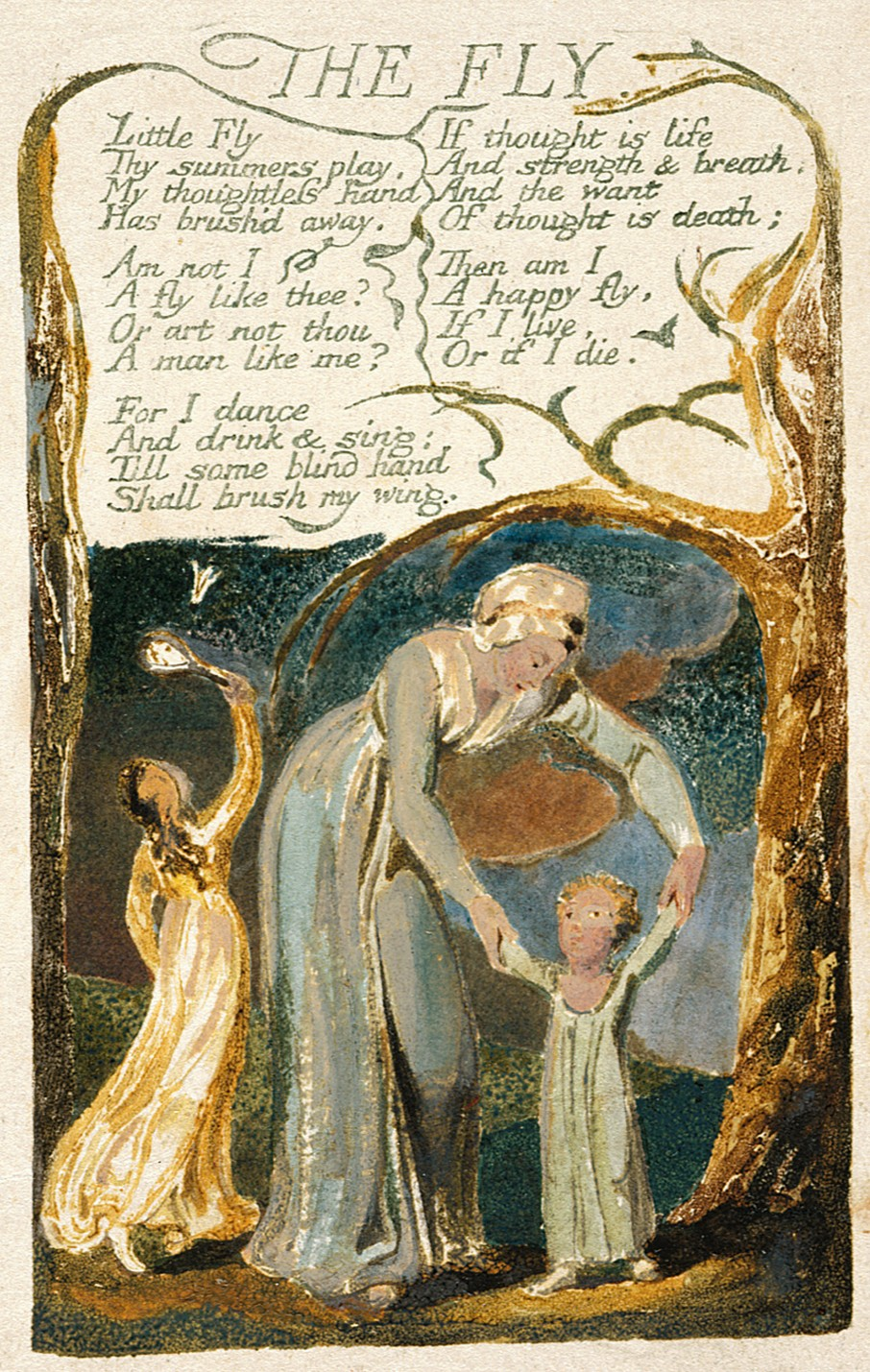
The illustrated version of "The Fly" from Copy F of Songs of Innocence and Experience currently held at the Yale Center for British Art

Little Fly
Thy summers play,
My thoughtless hand
Has brush'd away.

Am not I
A fly like thee?
Or art not thou
A man like me?

For I dance
And drink & sing:
Till some blind hand
Shall brush my wing.

If thought is life
And strength & breath:
And the want
Of thought is death;

Then am I
A happy fly,
If I live,
Or if I die.

== Interpretation ==
Blake printed the poem with the text set in the branches of trees, an image of a nurse and a toddler in the foreground, and a girl with a racket about to hit a shuttlecock in the background. G. S. Morris notes that "the lines 'Till some blind hand / Shall brush my wing' seem to follow the feathered shuttlecock directly into the little girl's racquet".

The poem catches the narrator in an act of thoughtlessness that leads to the contemplation of the act and its implications. The fly suffers from uncontrollable circumstances, just as the narrator does. This humbling simile has caused the narrator to move from thoughtlessness to thought, and, as "thought is life", from death to life, allowing the conclusion, "Then am I / A happy fly / If I live, / Or if I die", a conclusion to which Paul Miner comments: "Brain-death is real death". "The Fly" tells of the ways of life and how to live impactfully because one never knows when a "blind hand shall brush [one's] wing"; that is, death.

== Legacy ==
- The Fly was set to music in 1965 by Benjamin Britten as part of his song cycle Songs and Proverbs of William Blake.
- It appears also in the song London on the 1987 Tangerine Dream album Tyger which is inspired by poetry of Blake.
- John Vanderslice adapted this poem into the song "If I Live or If I Die" on his 2001 album Time Travel Is Lonely.
- Esperanza Spalding recorded this poem on her 2010 album Chamber Music Society.
- Cosmo Sheldrake set this poem to music in his 2015 EP Pelicans We.
- London Grammar uses references to the poem as part of their 2024 album The Greatest Love.
