= 24-class sloop =

1918 class of British sloops-of-war

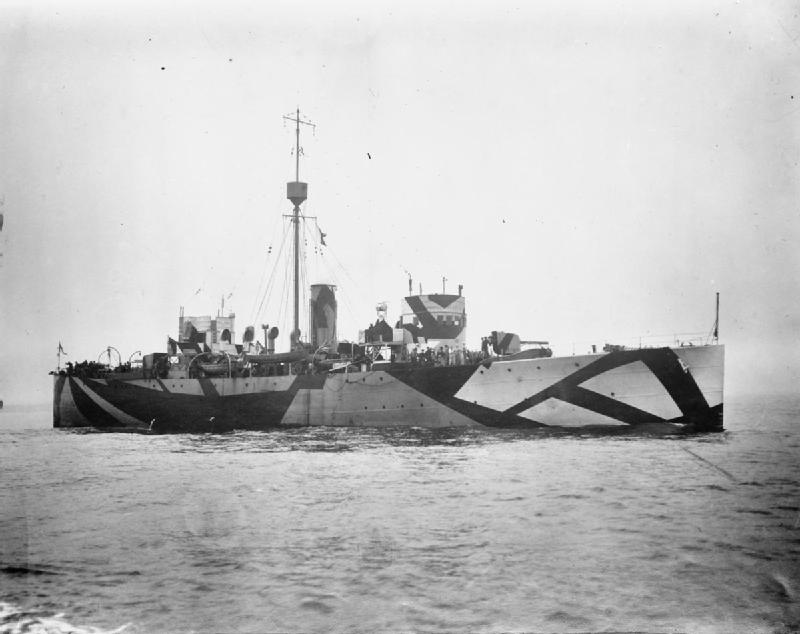
- HMS Sir Bevis

Class overview
- Operators: Royal Navy; Royal Australian Navy; Imperial Japanese Navy
- Preceded by: Flower class
- Succeeded by: Bridgewater class
- Built: 1917–1918
- In commission: 1918–1946
- Planned: 24
- Completed: 22
- Cancelled: 2
- Lost: 1

General characteristics
- Type: Sloop
- Displacement: 1,320 long tons (1,341 t) standard
- Length: 258 ft (79 m) p/p; 267 ft 6 in (81.53 m) o/a
- Beam: 35 ft (11 m)
- Draught: 10 ft 6 in (3.20 m)
- Propulsion: 4-cylinder triple expansion engine, 2,500 ihp (1,900 kW); 2 cylindrical boilers; 1 screw
- Speed: 17 knots (20 mph; 31 km/h)
- Range: 260 tons of coal
- Complement: 82
- Armament: As designed: 2 × 4 in (100 mm) guns; 39 Depth charges

The 24 class was a class of minesweeping sloops. They were derived from the preceding Flower-class sloop, but designed to appear double-ended. Twenty-four ships to this design (hence the class name) were ordered between December 1916 and April 1917 under the Emergency War Programme for the Royal Navy in World War I, although two of them were cancelled before launch. All were named after famous racehorses (winners of The Derby), but they were not named Racehorse class as the Admiralty realised that this could easily be confused in communications with the Racecourse class of paddle minesweepers, and they officially became the 24 class.

Like the Flower-class sloops, they were single-screw fleet sweeping sloops used almost entirely for minesweeping, although only ten were completed by the Armistice in 1918. However, they had identical deckhouses and gun shields at either end of the vessel, with straight stems and sterns. Furthermore, four of those completed had the single mast aft of the centrally located funnel, and the rest had the mast forward of the funnel. The symmetrical design was completed with fake anchors at the stern to confuse enemy targeting.

== Ships ==
- HMS Ard Patrick — built by Swan Hunter & Wigham Richardson, Wallsend on Tyne, launched 6 June 1918. Sold 12 August 1920.
- HMS Bend Or — built by Barclay Curle & Company, Whiteinch, launched 24 September 1918. Sold 12 August 1920.
- HMS Cicero — built by Swan Hunter, launched 26 July 1918. Sold for breaking up 1 December 1921.
- HMS Donovan — built by Greenock & Grangemouth Dockyard Company, launched 27 April 1918. Sold 15 November 1922.
- HMS Flying Fox — built by Swan Hunter, launched 28 March 1918. Transferred to RNVR on 24 March 1920. Sold for breaking up in 1973.
- HMS Galtee More — ordered from Osbourne Graham, transferred to Swan Hunter 7 June 1918, then cancelled 3 December 1918.
- HMS Harvester — built by Barclay Curle & Company, Whiteinch, launched 2 November 1918. Sold for breaking up in August 1922.
- HMS Iroquois — built by Barclay Curle, launched 24 August 1918. Survey ship in 1922. Sold for breaking up 28 June 1937.
- HMS Isinglass — built by Greenock & Grangemouth Dockyard, launched 5 March 1919. Sold 12 August 1920.
- HMS Ladas — built by Osbourne Graham & Company, Sunderland, launched 21 September 1918. Sold 6 November 1920.
- HMS Merry Hampton — built by Blyth Shipbuilding & Dry Dock Company, launched 19 December 1918. Survey ship in February 1923, renamed Herald. Scuttled in February 1942 at Selatar but salved by the Japanese Navy and renamed Heiyo in October 1942. Sunk by mine 14 November 1944.
- HMS Minoru — built by Swan Hunter, launched 6 June 1919. Sold 25 February 1920, becoming mercantile Haim Mazza.
- HMS Orby — built by Swan Hunter, launched 22 October 1918. Sold to break up 15 November 1922.
- HMS Ormonde — built by Blyth Shipbuilding & Dry Dock Company, launched 8 June 1918. Survey vessel in March 1924. Sold 6 August 1937 to break up.
- HMS Persimmon — built by Osbourne Graham, launched 4 March 1919. Sold 12 August 1920 but sale was cancelled; re-sold 13 October 1922.
- HMS Rocksand — built by Swan Hunter, launched 10 July 1918. Sold 15 November 1922.
- HMS Sanfoin — built by Greenock & Grangemouth Dockyard Company, Greenock, launched 10 June 1918. Sold 15 November 1922.
- HMS Sefton — built by Barclay Curle, launched 6 July 1918. Sold August 1922.
- HMS Silvio — built by Barclay Curle, launched 12 April 1918. Transferred to Royal Australian Navy in December 1924 and became survey ship HMAS Moresby in April 1925. Escort vessel 1940. Sold for breaking up 1946 at Newcastle, NSW.
- HMS Sir Bevis — built by Barclay Curle, launched 11 May 1918. Transferred to RNVR in September 1923, renamed Irwell, then again renamed Eaglet in 1926.
- HMS Sir Hugo — built by Greenock & Grangemouth, launched 20 September 1918. Depot ship in October 1919. Sold for breaking up 25 June 1930.
- HMS Sir Visto — built by Osbourne Graham, launched 4 December 1918. Sold 12 August 1920, becoming mercantile Fanny Mazza.
- HMS Spearmint — built by Swan Hunter, launched 23 September 1918. Sold for breaking up 29 November 1922.
- HMS Sunstar — ordered from Swan Hunter, but cancelled 3 December 1918.

== Bibliography ==
- The Grand Fleet, Warship Design and Development 1906–1922, D. K. Brown, Chatham Publishing, 1999, ISBN 978-1-86176-099-9
- Jane's Fighting Ships of World War I, Janes Publishing, 1919
- Lenton, H. T. (1998). British & Empire Warships of the Second World War. Annapolis, Maryland: Naval Institute Press. ISBN 1-55750-048-7.
