= Songs and Proverbs of William Blake =

Song cycle by Benjamin Britten

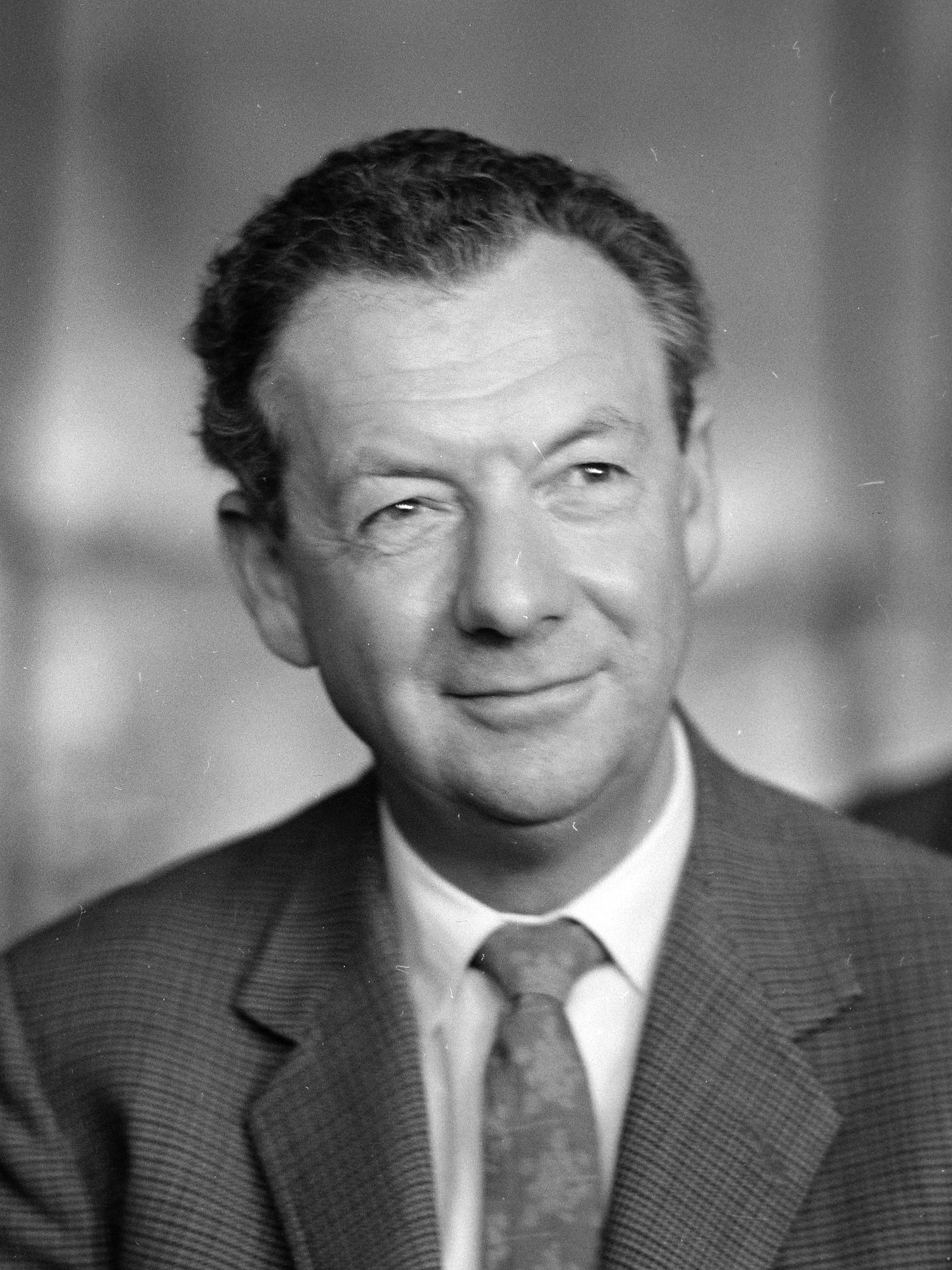
Benjamin Britten in 1965

Songs and Proverbs of William Blake is a song cycle composed by Benjamin Britten (1913–76) in 1965 for baritone voice and piano and published as his Op. 74. The published score states that the words were "selected by Peter Pears" from Proverbs of Hell, Auguries of Innocence and Songs of Experience by William Blake (1757–1827).

It was premiered at the Aldeburgh Festival in June 1965 by the composer and the German baritone Dietrich Fischer-Dieskau (1925–2012), for whom it was written. The critic William Mann thought that the cycle would be judged "Britten's deepest and most subtle song-cycle"; and John Warrack wrote in The Daily Telegraph that Britten "has, I feel, here come to terms with the darkness and sense of cruelty that has always stalked his art".

The cycle was recorded for Decca by the original performers in December 1965 in the Kingsway Hall, London with John Culshaw as producer and Kenneth Wilkinson as engineer. A recording by Gerald Finley (baritone) and Julius Drake (piano) won the solo vocal Gramophone Award in 2011.

== Songs ==
The cycle is through-composed, without breaks, but divides into the following sections:

1. "Proverb 1"
2. "London"
3. "Proverb 2"
4. "The Chimney Sweeper"
5. "Proverb 3"
6. "A Poison Tree"
7. "Proverb 4"
8. "The Tyger"
9. "Proverb 5"
10. "The Fly"
11. "Proverb 6"
12. "Ah! Sun-flower"
13. "Proverb 7"
14. "Every Night and Every Morn"

"Proverb 7" and "Every Night and Every Morn" are from Auguries of Innocence; the other proverbs are from Proverbs of Hell, and the other poems are from Songs of Experience.
