= The Tyger =

1794 poem by William Blake

- by William Blake
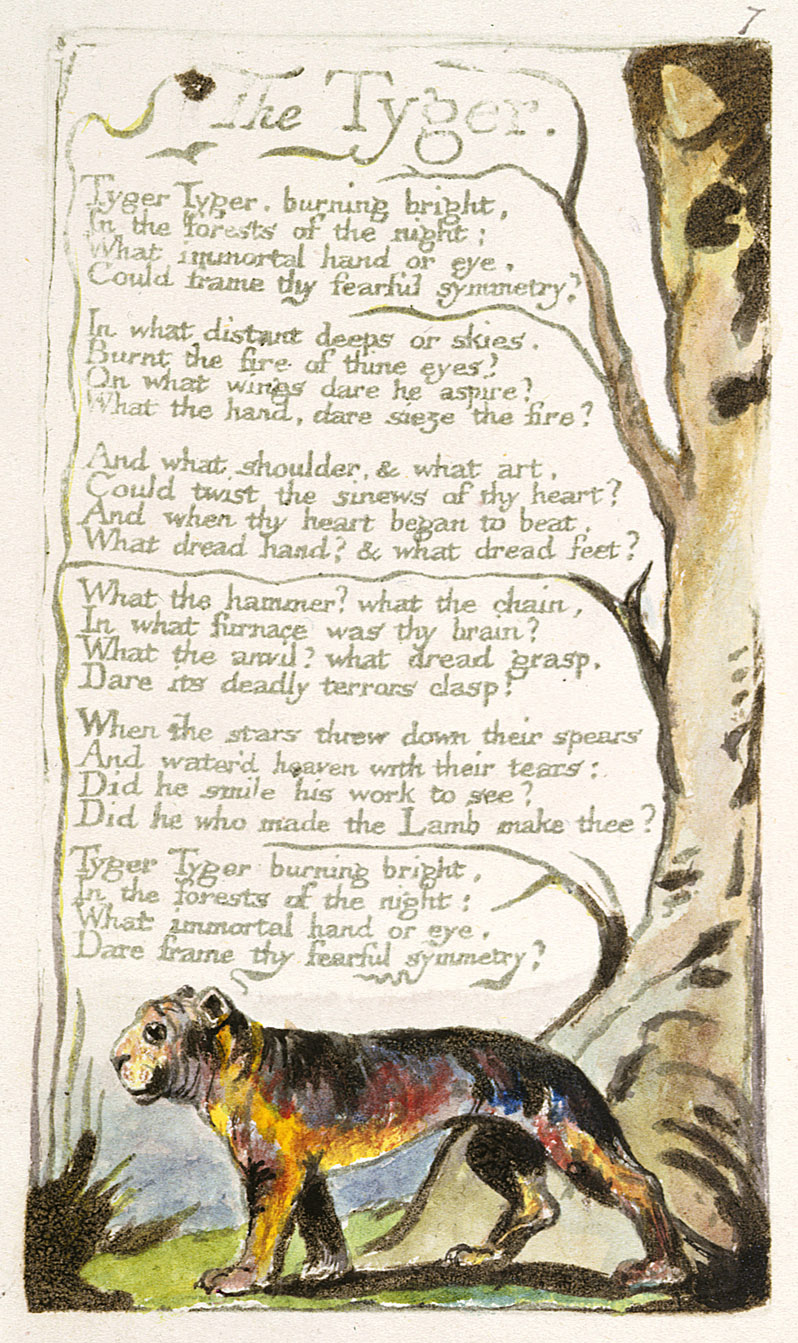
- Copy A of Blake's original printing of The Tyger, 1794. Copy A is held by the British Museum.
- Country: England
- Language: English
- Publication date: 1794

Full text
- The Tyger (1794) at Wikisource

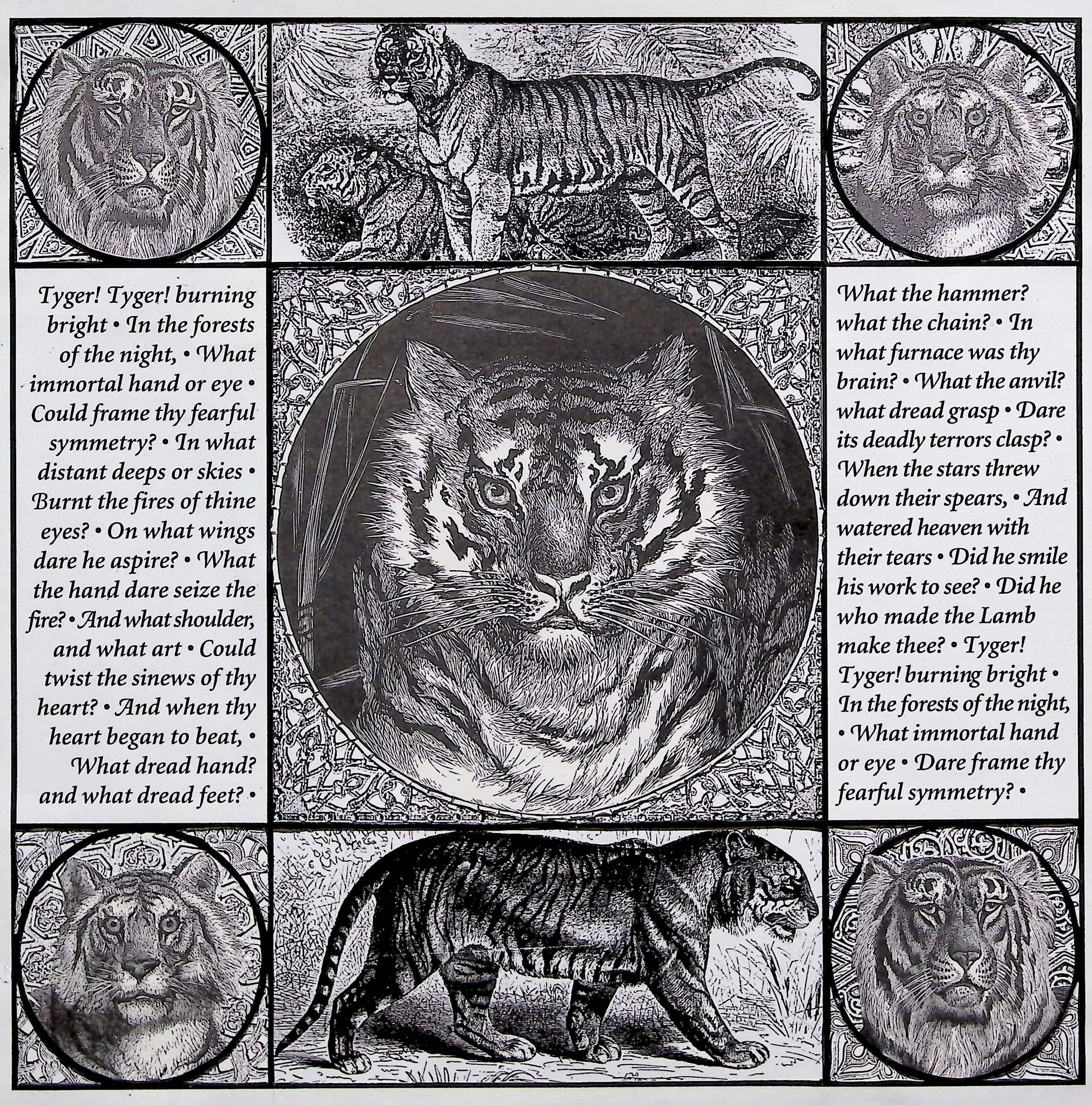
"Tyger, Tyger", illustrated by Freddie Baer (1994)

The Tyger (also spelt The Tiger) is a poem by William Blake, published in 1794 in Songs of Experience, as Blake was rising to prominence as a poet. The poem is one of the most anthologised in the English literary canon; it has been the subject of much literary criticism, and the inspiration for many musical settings and other adaptations. It explores Christian religious paradigms prevalent in late-18th-century and early-19th-century England, questioning the intention and motivation behind God's creation of such disparate beings as the "Lamb" and the eponymous "Tyger."

== Songs of Experience ==
Songs of Experience was published in 1794 as a follow-up to Blake's 1789 Songs of Innocence. The two books were published together under the merged title Songs of Innocence and of Experience, showing the Two Contrary States of the Human Soul: the author and printer, W. Blake featuring 54 illustrated plates. Blake reprinted the work throughout his life. In some reprints, plates were arranged differently and certain poems were moved from Songs of Innocence to Songs of Experience. Of the original collection published during his life only 28 copies are known to exist, with an additional 16 published posthumously. Only five of the poems from Songs of Experience appeared individually before 1839.

== Poem ==
Tyger Tyger, burning bright,
In the forests of the night;
What immortal hand or eye,
Could frame thy fearful symmetry?

In what distant deeps or skies.
Burnt the fire of thine eyes?
On what wings dare he aspire?
What the hand, dare seize the fire?

And what shoulder, & what art,
Could twist the sinews of thy heart?
And when thy heart began to beat,
What dread hand? & what dread feet?

What the hammer? what the chain,
In what furnace was thy brain?
What the anvil? what dread grasp,
Dare its deadly terrors clasp!

When the stars threw down their spears
And water'd heaven with their tears:
Did he smile his work to see?
Did he who made the Lamb make thee?

Tyger Tyger burning bright,
In the forests of the night:
What immortal hand or eye,
Dare frame thy fearful symmetry?

== Structure ==
"The Tyger" is six stanzas in length with each stanza containing four lines. The meter of the poem is largely trochaic tetrameter. A number of lines, such as line four in the first stanza, fall into iambic tetrameter.

The poem is structured around questions that the speaker poses concerning the "Tyger," including the phrase "Who made thee?" These questions often repeat instances of alliteration ("frame" and "fearful") and imagery (burning, fire, eyes) to frame the arc of the poem.

The first stanza opens the poem with a central line of questioning, stating "What immortal hand or eye, / Could frame thy fearful symmetry?". This direct address to the creature serves as a foundation for the poem's contemplative style as the "Tyger" cannot provide the speaker with a satisfactory answer. The second stanza questions the "Tyger" about where it was created, while the third stanza sees the focus move from the "Tyger" to its creator. The fourth stanza questions what tools were used in the "Tyger's" creation. In the fifth stanza, the speaker wonders how the creator reacted to its "Tyger" and questions the identity of the creator themselves. Finally, the sixth stanza virtually repeats the poem's first stanza but rephrases the last line, altering its meaning: rather than question who or what "could" create the "Tyger", the speaker wonders who would "dare," effectively modifying the tone of the stanza to present as more of a confrontation than a query.

== Themes and critical analysis ==
"The Tyger" is the sister poem to "The Lamb" (from "Songs of Innocence"), a reflection of similar ideas from a different perspective. In "The Tyger", there is a duality between beauty and ferocity, through which Blake suggests that understanding one requires an understanding of the other.

"The Tyger," as a work within the "Songs of Experience," was written as antithetical to its counterpart from the "Songs of Innocence" ("The Lamb") – antithesis being a recurring theme in Blake's philosophy and work. Blake argues that humankind's struggles have their origin in the dichotomies of existence. His poetry argues that truth lies in comprehending the contradictions between innocence and experience. To Blake, experience is not the face of evil, but rather a natural component of existence. Rather than believing in war between good and evil or heaven and hell, Blake believed that each man must first see and then resolve the paradoxes of existence and life. Therefore, the questions posed by the speaker within "The Tyger" are intentionally rhetorical; they are meant to be answered individually by readers instead of brought to a general consensus.

Colin Pedley and others have suggested that Blake may have been influenced in selecting the subject of this poem by the killing of a son of Sir Hector Munro by a tiger in December 1792.

== Musical versions ==
Blake's original tunes for his poems have been lost in time, but many artists have tried to create their own versions of the tunes.

- Rebecca Clarke – "The Tiger" (1929–33)
- Benjamin Britten, in his song cycle Songs and Proverbs of William Blake (1965)
- Marianne Faithfull, in her song "Eye Communication" (1981) from the Dangerous Acquaintances album.
- Howard Frazin, in his song "The Tiger" for soprano and piano (2008), later expanded into an overture for orchestra, "In the Forests of the Night" (2009) commissioned by the Boston Classical Orchestra.
- Duran Duran – "Tiger Tiger" (1983)
- Greg Brown, on the album Songs of Innocence and of Experience (1986)
- John Tavener – "The Tyger" (1987)
- Tangerine Dream – the album Tyger (1987)
- Jah Wobble – "Tyger Tyger" (1996)
- Lauren Bernofsky – "The Tiger" (2002)
- Kenneth Fuchs – Songs of Innocence and of Experience: Four Poems by William Blake for Baritone, Flute, Oboe, Cello, and Harp (completed 2006)
- Herbst in Peking – "The Tyger and The Fly" (2014)
- Qntal – "Tyger" (2014)
- Mephisto Walz – "The Tyger"
- Elaine Hagenberg– "Tyger" for SATB Chorus and piano (2021) Hagenberg, Elaine (1 January 2021). "Tyger".
- Katie O'Connor-Ballantyne – "Tiger! Tiger!"

Bob Dylan refers to Blake's poem in "Roll on John" (2012).

Five Iron Frenzy uses two lines of the poem in "Every New Day" on Our Newest Album Ever! (1997).

Joni Mitchell uses two lines in her song about the music industry, the title track of her 1998 album Taming the Tiger.

== See also ==
- Eye rhyme
- Fearful Symmetry (disambiguation)
- Quasar, Quasar, Burning Bright
- The Stars My Destination or Tiger! Tiger! (science fiction novel, 1956)

== Sources ==
- Bentley, G. E. Jr. (editor). William Blake: The Critical Heritage. London: Routledge, 1975.
- Bentley, G. E. Jr. The Stranger from Paradise. New Haven: Yale University Press, 2003. ISBN 0-300-10030-2.
- Damon, S. Foster. A Blake Dictionary, 2nd ed. Hanover, NH: University Press of New England, 1988.
- Davis, Michael. William Blake: A New Kind of Man. University of California Press, 1977.
- Eaves, Morris. The Cambridge Companion to William Blake, 2003. ISBN 978-0-521-78677-5.
- Gilchrist, Alexander. The Life of William Blake. London: John Lane Company, 1907.
- Kazin, Alfred. "Introduction". The Portable Blake. The Viking Portable Library.
- Whitson, Roger and Jason Whittaker. William Blake and Digital Humanities: Collaboration, Participation, and Social Media. New York: Routledge, 2013. ISBN 978-0415-65618-4.
