= Larry Norman discography =

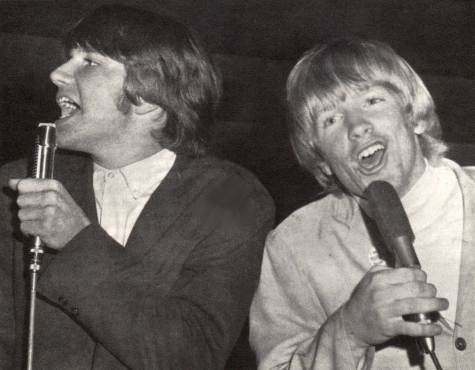
- Larry Norman (right) performing with Gene Mason (left)
- Studio albums: 47
- Extended plays: 2
- Live albums: 31
- Compilation albums: 32
- Singles: 3
- Video albums: 3

Recording since 1966, first as a lead singer for the group People! and then as a solo artist, Larry Norman is noted for his extensive career as well his attention to Christian subject matter. His music was released on both mainstream and independent labels, including his own Solid Rock Records. During his career his work appeared on over 100 albums, concert bootlegs, and compilations.

== People! discography ==
=== Studio albums ===
Title	Year of release
I Love You	1968
Both Sides of People!	1969

=== Live albums ===
Title	Year of release
People! The Reunion Concert 2006	2007

=== Compilation albums ===
Title	Year of release
I Love You Korea (Note: a 1995 Korean CD re-issue of People!'s debut album on SiWan Records Released by Solid Rock Records in 2007.)	1995
Best of People Vol. 1 - 40 Year Anniversary	2006
Best of People Vol. 2 - 40 Year Anniversary	2006

== Solo discography ==
=== Studio albums ===
Title	Year of release
Upon This Rock	1969
Only Visiting This Planet	1972
So Long Ago the Garden	1973
In Another Land	1976
Streams of White Light Into Darkened Corners	1977
Something New under the Son	1981
The Story of the Tune	1983
Home at Last	1989
Stranded in Babylon	1991
A Moment in Time	1994
Copper Wires	1998
Breathe In, Breathe Out (with Beam)	1998
Tourniquet	2001
Christmastime	2003

=== Live albums ===
Title	Year of release
Street Level	1970
Roll Away the Stone	1980
The Israel Tapes (with People!)	1980
Larry Norman and His Friends on Tour	1981
Come as a Child	1983
Stop This Flight	1985
Live at Flevo (with Q. Stone)	1989
Omega Europa (with the Judaic Vikings)	1993
Children of Sorrow	1994
Totally Unplugged (Volume 1)	1994
Shouting in the Storm	1998
Live at the Mac	1998
The Vineyard	1999
In The Beginning (Note: live album from Creation West 2000 festival)	2000
Blarney Stone	2000
Sticks and Stones	2000
Rough Diamonds, Precious Jewels: The Belfast Bootlegs 1981-2000 (Note: 2001 live collection through the years)	2001
Live on Tour (Note: (Micah Records))	2001
Live at Cornerstone	2003
Restless in Manhattan (Note: live album from the early '70s)	2003
Road Rage	2003
On the Prowl	2004
70 Miles from Lebanon	2004
Snowblind (Note: live album from the 1980s)	2004
The Final Concert	2004
The Norman Invasion	2004
Hattem	2005
Face to Face (DVD)	2005
Ten Times Two - Tour of the Americas (with Randy Stonehill) (Note: album covering ten years of touring and recording in the 1970s with Randy Stonehill)	2005
Snapshots from the '77 World Tour	2005
Live at the Elsinore	2005
The Norman Conquest	2005
How Then Shall We Live?	2006
Monsters (Note: Live recordings from the 1980s)	2006
Pot O' Gold	2007
Face to Face (Note: Collection of live tracks from the 1986 video Round the World Rock and Roll Band Tour)	2007
You Are Not My People (Note: album featuring songs from the two 'Live At Flevo' albums recorded in 1989 and 1990)	2007
FINALé (DVD) (Note: live DVD from 2007's final concert in New York City)	2008
Sixty - The Trilogy Concert (Note: album of his 20 April 2007 60th birthday performance of his three Trilogy albums)	2009
Live at the Cavern Club (Note: 2 disc album, live recording of a 9 August 2001 concert at the Cavern Club, Liverpool)	2009

=== Compilation albums ===
Title	Year of release
Bootleg	1971
Larry Norman	1977
bArchaeology	1984
Back To America (12-inch EP)	1985
Rehearsal for Reality	1986
Down Under (But Not Out)	1986
White Blossoms From Black Roots (The History & Chronology - Volume One)	1988
The Best Of The 2nd Trilogy	1989
Rough Mix 3	1990
The Best Of Larry Norman	1990
Footprints in the Sand	1994
Gathered Moments (Somewhere In This Lifetime)	1998
We Wish You a Larry Christmas (with People!)	1998
Home Box (Note: featuring Home at Last and Footprints In The Sand together)	1998
Rough Street Love Letter	1999
The Cottage Tapes - Book One (with Randy Stonehill)	2000
The Best of Larry Norman - Volume 1	2001
The Best of Larry Norman - Volume 2	2001
Instigator: The Essential - Volume 1	2002
Agitator: The Essential - Volume 2	2002
Collaborator: The Essential - Volume 4	2002
Survivor: The Essential - Volume 7	2002
Rock, Scissors et Papier	2003
Larry Norman Presents Solid Rock Sampler 1 (Note: (includes other artists))	2003
American Roots	2003
The Very Best Of Larry Norman	2003
Infiltrator: The Essential - Volume 6	2004
Liberator: The Essential - Volume 3	2004
Sessions (Note: medical expenses special) (Note: First six songs by Larry Norman, the remainder are by Daniel Amos, Keith Green, Randy Stonehill, Tom Howard, David Mattson, and Steve 'n' Stonebrooke)	2004
Heartland Junction	2004
The Cottage Tapes - Book Two (with Randy Stonehill)	2004
Emancipator: The Essential - Volume 5	2004
Maximum Garden - The Anthology Series (Note: alternate takes collection)	2004
Maximum Planet - The Anthology Series (Note: alternate takes collection)	2004
Frisbee (Note: Unsanctioned soundtrack album. Pulled upon release and retitled/repackaged as Slinky)	2005
4 Track Motorola '66 Corolla (Note: alternate takes and outtakes album)	2005
Underground Manouevers (Note: 22-track compilation of assorted live recordings and studio rarities)	2005
Siege at Elsinore (Larry Norman & Hamlet)	2005
Safecracking	2006
Maximum Son - The Anthology Series (Note: alternate takes collection)	2006
Wounded Lion (Note: Recorded radio performances from Europe circa 1977)	2006
Motorola Corolla 2 (Note: collection of demo recordings of songs in contention for the Birthday for Shakespeare musical)	2007
The Colossus of Roads	2008
Rebel Poet, Jukebox Balladeer: The Anthology	2008
Maximum Land - The Anthology Series (Note: alternate takes collection)	2011
Digital (Dutch) Masters (with Thesis)	2011
Shake Your Rattle and Crawl: Larry Norman Songs For Kids	2011
Rough Mix 2	2011 (Note: 2 CD set)
The Girl With the Golden Hair	2011
Magnetic Real: The Living Room Tapes - Vol. 1 (Note: 4 previously unreleased songs plus "Moses" recorded in 1963)	2011
Magnetic Real: The Living Room Tapes - Vol. 2 (Note: 4 previously unreleased songs plus an early version of "Country Church" recorded in 1963)	2012
Magnetic Real: The Living Room Tapes - Vol. 3 (Note: 4 previously unreleased songs plus "Lonely Boy" recorded in 1963)	2013
Magnetic Real: The Living Room Tapes - Vol. 4 (Note: 4 previously unreleased songs plus an early version of "Oh Lydia" recorded in 1963)	2013
Shepherd of Green Pastures (Note: 3 previously unreleased songs: "You Gotta Move" (written by Mississippi Fred McDowell & Rev. Gary Davis) (recorded 1999); "The Staff that I Lean on" (written by Kristy Norman) (recorded in 1969 for the unreleased Orphans From Eden album); "Six Feet of Chain" (written by Lee Hazlewood) (recorded 2007); and a 1980 interview.)	2013
The Hum of Diesels	2018
The Salt of the Sea	2018
Magnetic Real: The Living Room Tapes - 1963	2018
Sierra Romeo	2018
Archive (Note: Exclusively available with pre-orders from Solid Rock of Gregory Alan Thornbury's biography on Larry Norman, Why Should The Devil Have All The Good Music?: Larry Norman And The Perils Of Christian Rock)	2018

=== Fan club releases ===
Title	Year of release
Father Touch (Note: Phann Klubb release)	1999
Dust on Rust (Note: Covers album recorded in acoustic style, made specifically for the Solid Rock Army as a free album to go with the free Phanzine magazine)	2006
Conscription 2007 (Note: Solid Rock Army release)	2007
Rough Mix Audio Pack (Note: Solid Rock Army release)	2009
Covert Field Report (Note: Solid Rock Army release)	2009
Tactical Maneuvers (Note: Solid Rock Army release, which includes "My Little Bun Board" written when Norman was 15)	2009
Solid Rock Army 2010 Disc 001 (Note: Solid Rock Army release, which includes a cover of Woody Guthrie's "This Land is Your Land", including the rare private property verse)	2010
Solid Rock Army 2010 Disc 002 (Note: Solid Rock Army release, which includes Norman's performance at the White House)	2010

=== Singles ===
Title	Year of release	Album
"Blow in My Ear and I'll Follow You Anywhere" (The Flies)	1969	non-album single
"Sweet Sweet Song of Salvation"	1970	Upon This Rock
"Righteous Rocker, Holy Roller (Without Love)"	1971	non-album single
"I've Got to Learn to Live Without You"	1973	Only Visiting This Planet
"Reader's Digest"	1973	Only Visiting This Planet
"It's the Same Old Story" (promo single)	1973	So Long Ago the Garden
"Baroquen Spirits" (promo single)	1973	So Long Ago the Garden
"Christmas Time" (France only)	1974	So Long Ago the Garden
"The Rock That Doesn't Roll" (promo single)	1976	In Another Land
"U.F.O."	1977	In Another Land
"I Feel Like Dying"	1981	Something New Under the Son
"The Tune (Almost)" (7-inch EP)	1981	Barking at the Ants
"Strong Love"	1984	Quiet Night
"Stop This Flight" (Live)	1985	Stop This Flight
"You Gotta Have Jesus"	2003	
"The Tune" (maxi-single)	2003	
"The First Noel"	2003	Christmastime
"The Six O'Clock News"	2004	
"Eve of Destruction"	2004	
"Strong Hand"/"Til Kingdom Come"	2005	
"The Road That Leads to Home"	2006	
"Lost Unto This World" (maxi-single) (Note: produced by Charles Norman)	2007	
"The Girl with the Golden Hair" (maxi-single)	2011	

=== Various artists albums ===
Title	Year of release
Barking at the Ants	1981
Invitation Only (Note: concert goer's release)	2003

=== Remix albums ===
Title	Year of release
Remixing This Planet	1996

== Young Lions discography ==
=== Studio albums ===
Title	Year of release
Letter of the Law	1982
Labor of Love	1982

=== Compilation albums ===
Title	Year of release
Quiet Night	1984

== The Larry Norman Bootleg Collection ==
From May 2011 Solid Rock released official Larry Norman Bootleg Collection albums as free downloads for members of the Solid Rock Army.

=== 2011 ===
- 001 Royal Albert Hall, London, 1973 (recorded January 6, 1973)
- 002 Kansas City, Missouri, 1978
- 003 Wellington, New Zealand, 1977
- 004 Oslo, Norway, 1977
- 005 Swansea, Wales, 1975
- 006 Wichita, Kansas, 1976 (recorded May 30, 1976)
- 007 The Wirral, England, 1991 (recorded January 5, 1991)

=== 2012 ===
- 008 Kamperland, 1980
- 009 BBC TELEVISION - CLIFF RICHARD'S ROCK GOSPEL SHOW, 1984 - hosted by Sheila Walsh, featuring duets with Cliff Richard and the London Community Gospel Choir. Broadcast Easter Sunday, April 7, 1985.
- 010 Tomfest, Skamania, Washington, 1997
- 011 Memphis, Tennessee, 2001 "Beyond Graceland's Gates")
- 012 Skien, Norway, 1998
- 013 Rotterdam, Holland, 1982? 1983? 1984?
- 014 Vlaardingen, Holland 1985
- 015 Portland Coliseum 1992
- 016 Wiley Hall, Minnesota 1981

== Selected contributions ==
- Born Twice, Randy Stonehill, 1971 debut album, including singing Norman compositions, vocals, produced by Norman
- Welcome To Paradise, Randy Stonehill, 1977, Vocals, Produced and Arranged by Larry Norman.
- Lead Me Home, Dave Mattson, 1978, Vocals.
- The Sky Is Falling, Randy Stonehill, 1979, Vocals, Produced and Arranged by Larry Norman.
- Appalachian Melody, Mark Heard, 1979, Vocals, Produced and Arranged by Larry Norman.
- I Remember, Little Bobby Emmons and the Crosstones, 1979, producer and co-wrote two songs.
- Stop the Dominoes, Mark Heard, 1981, Vocals.
- Victims of the Age, Mark Heard, 1982, Vocals.
- Songs From The Earth, Lyrix, 1982, producer
- Wondergroove - Hi-Fi Demonstration Disc, 1994 Albino Brothers album (Charly Norman and "Merchants of Venice" band), with two bonus tracks with Larry Norman singing: Down To The Water, and I Want It All.
- Q-Stone, eponymous debut album. Norman sang back-up harmonies, co-wrote several songs, and performed a duet ("Sweet Dreams") with lead singer Mikko Kuustonen
- Caught in Time, 2000 album by Lisa Weyerhaeuser, producer, co-wrote and duet on "Closest Friend", background vocals on other songs
- "Hound of Heaven", on When Worlds Collide: A Tribute to Daniel Amos, 2000.
- Sang backup vocals and played harp on a song on Kevin Max's Stereotype B album, 2001
- Edge of the World, Randy Stonehill, 2002, Guest Vocalist on "We Were All So Young".
- Decade, a 2006 compilation of Randy Stonehill's compositions arranged and produced by Larry Norman, including unreleased bonus tracks
- Early Morning Hours, Sarah Brendel, 2008, Guest Vocalist.
- "Ya Gotta Be Saved", The Crosstones, 2010, duet with Bobby Emmons.
- Thriftstore Masterpiece Presents Lee Hazlewood's Trouble Is A Lonesome Town, Thrisftstore Masterpiece, 2013, Vocals on "Ugly Brown" and "Trouble is a Lonesome Town".

== List of songs recorded by Larry Norman ==
The following is a sortable table of all songs by Larry Norman:

- The column Song list the song title.
- The column Writer(s) lists who wrote the song.
- The column Original Release lists the original album or single the recording first appeared on.
- The column Year lists the year in which the song was released.

Name of song, writer(s), original release, producer(s), and year of release.
Song	Writer(s)	Original release	Year	Other release(s) on albums
"1-0411-7-4"		Motorola Corolla 2	2007	
"1-0411-7-5"		Motorola Corolla 2	2007	
"1-0411-7-6"		Motorola Corolla 2	2007	
"1-0411-7-7"		Motorola Corolla 2	2007	
"1-0411-7-11"		Motorola Corolla 2	2007	
"1-0411-7-13"		Motorola Corolla 2	2007	
"1-0411-7-15"		Motorola Corolla 2	2007	
"1000 Years B.C." (People!)	Norman; Robb Levin	I Love You	1968	We Wish You a Larry Christmas; I Love You Korea; The Best of People! Vol. 2
"All Fall Down"	Bono; Daniel Lanois	Sessions	2004	The Colossus of Roads; The Hum of the Diesels
"...All I See Is You..."		Motorola Corolla 2	2007	
"All the Way Home"	Norman	Stranded in Babylon	1991	Totally Unplugged; Sonrise; Rough Diamonds, Precious Jewels (The Belfast Bootlegs); Collaborator: The Essential - Volume 4; The Very Best of Larry Norman Vol. 2
"Amen" (intro to "If God Is My Father")	Norman	Maximum Garden: The Anthology Series	2004	
"And We Sing the Tune"	Norman	Stop This Flight	1985	Back to America; The Vineyard; Rough Diamonds, Precious Jewels (The Belfast Bootlegs); Snowblind; On the Prowl; Live at the Cavern Club
"Angels We Have Heard on High"	James Chadwick	Christmastime	2003	
"Apple Cider" (People!)	People!	Non-album single	1968	Down Under (But Not Out) (Illegal Noise CD); We Wish You a Larry Christmas; The Best of People! Vol. 2
"Arafat, Bush and American Money"	Norman	The Final Concert	2004	
"Are You Breathing?" (instrumental)	Norman	Father Touch	1999	
"Ashes of Me" (People!)	Albert Ribisi	I Love You	1968	Down Under (But Not Out); We Wish You a Larry Christmas; I Love You Korea; The Best of People! Vol. 1
"At the Circus"	Norman	Rough Diamonds, Precious Jewels (The Belfast Bootlegs)	2001	How Then Shall We Live?; Shake Your Rattle and Crawl: Larry Norman Songs For Kids
"At the Shore"		Magnetic Real: The Living Room Tapes - Vol. 3 (1963)	2013	Magnetic Real: The Living Room Tapes - 1963
"Auld Lang Syne"	Traditional	Christmastime	2003	
"Ba Ya Ne and Lay Your Hands on Me"		Live at the Elsinore	2005	
"Baby Out of Wedlock" (a.k.a. "You Knew What You Were Doing," "When You Sent Your Son") (Larry Norman & White Light)	Norman	Street Level (underground edition)	1971	The Israel Tapes; Children of Sorrow; The Vineyard; Where The Woodbine Twineth; The Cottage Tapes, Book One; Rough Diamonds, Precious Jewels (The Belfast Bootlegs); Survivor: The Essential - Volume 7; Restless in Manhattan '72; Frisbee; Slinky
"Baby's Got the Blues"	Norman	Stranded in Babylon	1991	Totally Unplugged; Infiltrator: The Essential - Volume 6
"Bark" (fragment from the movie Beware! The Blob, no music)		Sticks & Stones	2000	
"Baroquen Spirits" (a.k.a. "Spirits")	Norman	So Long Ago the Garden	1973	"Baroquen Spirits" (promo single); The Israel Tapes; Instigator: The Essential - Volume 1; Maximum Garden: The Anthology Series; 4 Track Motorola '66 Corolla; Siege at Elsinore; Rebel Poet, Jukebox Balladeer: The Anthology
"The Bases Are Loaded with Men"		Motorola Corolla 2	2007	
"Be Aware of Your Breathing"		Motorola Corolla 2	2007	
"Be Careful What You Sign"	Norman	So Long Ago the Garden	1973	Larry Norman (Starstorm); Live at Flevo; Rough Diamonds, Precious Jewels (The Belfast Bootlegs); Agitator: The Essential - Volume 2; Rock, Scissors et Papier; Road Rage; The Very Best of Larry Norman Vol. 2; Emancipator: The Essential - Volume 5; Maximum Garden: The Anthology Series; Siege at Elsinore; Pot O' Gold; You Are Not My People; Sixty - The Trilogy Concert; The Colossus of Roads
"Being What I Am"		Motorola Corolla 2	2007	
"Berkeley Barb"		Motorola Corolla 2	2007	
"Best Friend"	Norman	4 Track Motorola '66 Corolla	2005	
"Bishop of Norway"	Norman	Rough Diamonds, Precious Jewels (The Belfast Bootlegs)	2001	
"Blind Randall"		Archive	2018	
"Blow in My Ear and I’ll Follow You Anywhere" (a.k.a. "Blow in My Ear") (The Flies)	Norman; Gary Tigerman; Michael Weston	Non-album single	1969	We Wish You a Larry Christmas; 4 Track Motorola '66 Corolla
"Blue Shoes White" (Larry Norman & White Light)	Norman	Street Level (underground edition)	1971	Bootleg; Where The Woodbine Twineth; The Cottage Tapes, Book One; Restless in Manhattan '72; Liberator: The Essential - Volume 3; The Norman Invasion; The Cottage Tapes - Book Two; Slinky
"Bombs"	Norman	Shouting in the Storm	1998	Rough Diamonds, Precious Jewels (The Belfast Bootlegs); Survivor: The Essential - Volume 7; Solid Rock Sampler 1; Road Rage; You Are Not My People
"Born to Be Unlucky" (a.k.a. "Unlucky Blues")	Norman	Something New Under the Son	1981	Gathered Moments (Somewhere in This Lifetime); Blarney Stone; The Best of Larry Norman - Volume 1; Rough Diamonds, Precious Jewels (The Belfast Bootlegs); Instigator: The Essential - Volume 1; Maximum Son: The Anthology Series; Rough Mix Audio Pack
"Breathe In" (instrumental)	Norman	Father Touch	1999	
"Bridge over Troubled Water"	Paul Simon	Streams of White Light Into Darkened Corners	1977	
"Broken Bonds, Fallen Friendship" (instrumental)	Norman	Rehearsal for Reality	1986	
"Buttercup"		Archive	2018	
"Butterfly"	Norman	Instigator: The Essential - Volume 1	2003	So Long Ago the Garden (CD re-release); Maximum Garden: The Anthology Series; Siege at Elsinore; Safecracking
"Camel Through a Needle's Eye" (a.k.a. "Camel in a Needle's Eye")	Norman	Home at Last	1989	The Gospel Rock Collection; Sticks & Stones; Rock, Scissors et Papier; Infiltrator: The Essential - Volume 6
"Center of My Heart" (a.k.a. "Love Song to God")	Norman	Blarney Stone	2000	Tourniquet; Rock, Scissors et Papier; Infiltrator: The Essential - Volume 6; Pot O' Gold; The Girl with the Golden Hair
"The Children of Nimrod"	Norman	A Moment in Time	1994	
"Change Into a Girl"		Motorola Corolla 2	2007	
"Childhood Dreams"		Rough Mix Audio Pack	2009	Sierra Romeo
"Chinatown" (with Randy Stonehill)	Randy Stonehill	Ten Times Two: Tour Of the Americas	2005	
"Christmas Song"		Magnetic Real: The Living Room Tapes - Vol. 4 (1963)	2013	Magnetic Real: The Living Room Tapes - 1963
"Christmas Time"	Norman; Randy Stonehill	So Long Ago the Garden	1973	"It's the Same Old Story" / "Christmas Time" (single); "Christmas Time" / "Christmas Song for All Year 'Round" (promo single); Larry Norman (Starstorm); The Best of Larry Norman - Volume 1; Instigator: The Essential - Volume 1; Solid Rock Sampler 1; The Very Best of Larry Norman Vol. 1; Christmastime; Maximum Garden: The Anthology Series; Sixty - The Trilogy Concert
"Christmas Time Is Here"	Vince Guaraldi; Lee Mendelson	Christmastime	2003	
"Classical Mandolin" (instrumental)	Norman	Bootleg	1972	
"Clean Lennon"		4 Track Motorola '66 Corolla	2005	
"Climb the Highest Mountain" (a.k.a. "If I Have To")		Barking at the Oops! Rough Mix 3	1990	Rough Street Love Letter
"Come Away"	Norman	Stranded in Babylon	1991	Liberator: The Essential - Volume 3
"Come on In"	Tom Howard	Labor of Love	1982	Quiet Night
"Cornerstone Blues"	Norman	Sticks & Stones	2000	
"Country Church, Country People"	Norman	The Story of the Tune	1983	Down Under (But Not Out) (Royal Music); Home at Last; The Best of Larry Norman - Volume 2; American Roots; Liberator: The Essential - Volume 3; Frisbee; Slinky; Magnetic Real: The Living Room Tapes - Vol. 2 (1963); Magnetic Real: The Living Room Tapes - 1963
"Coy Boy"	Norman	Rough Diamonds, Precious Jewels (The Belfast Bootlegs)	2001	
"Cross That Line" (with Randy Stonehill)		Ten Times Two: Tour Of the Americas	2005	
"Crossroads"		"Strong Hand" / "Til Kingdom Come" (single)	2005	Sierra Romeo
"Crying Shoes" (People!)	Dennis Fridkin	I Love You	1968	I Love You Korea; The Best of People! Vol. 1; People! The Reunion Concert 2006
"Danger in Loving You"	Tom Howard	Letter of the Law	1982	
"A Dangerous Place to Be"	Norman	Stranded in Babylon	1991	Collaborator: The Essential - Volume 4
"Dark Passage"	Norman	Father Touch	1999	Tourniquet (bonus track); Survivor: The Essential - Volume 7; The Norman Conquest
"The Day That a Child Appeared" (a.k.a. "Child")	Norman	Bootleg	1972	The Best of Larry Norman - Volume 1; Christmastime; 4 Track Motorola '66 Corolla
"Day Tripper"	John Lennon; Paul McCartney	Pot O' Gold	2007	Live at the Cavern Club
"Dear Malcolm, Dear Alwyn"	Norman	Jubilation! Songs of Praise and Worship!	1975	So Long Ago the Garden (CD); Sticks & Stones; The Best of Larry Norman - Volume 1; Emancipator: The Essential - Volume 5
"Deep Blue" (a.k.a. "Sinking in Deep Blue")	Norman	Something New Under the Son (CD release)	1993	Barking at the Ants; Barking at the Oops! Rough Mix 3; Infiltrator: The Essential - Volume 6; Wounded Lion; Maximum Son: The Anthology Series; Motorola Corolla 2
"Deja Vu" (instrumental)	Norman	Father Touch	1999	
"Delta Day Jam"	Norman	In Another Land (25th Anniversary Edition)	1999	Blarney Stone
"Desperado" (with Randy Stonehill)		Ten Times Two: Tour Of the Americas	2005	
"Diamonds"	Norman	In Another Land	1976	"The Rock That Doesn't Roll" / "Diamonds/One Way" (promo single); Sonrise; The Vineyard; Rough Diamonds, Precious Jewels (The Belfast Bootlegs); Agitator: The Essential - Volume 2; Restless in Manhattan '72; The Very Best of Larry Norman Vol. 2; Siege at Elsinore; In Another Land: The Missing Pieces; How Then Shall We Live?; Sixty - The Trilogy Concert; Live at the Cavern Club
"Die in the Morning"		Magnetic Real: The Living Room Tapes - Vol. 4 (1963)	2013	Magnetic Real: The Living Room Tapes - 1963
"Do You See What I See?"	Noël Regney; Gloria Shayne Baker	Christmastime	2003	
"The Dog and the Flower"		Flevo Totaal Festival - Live Tapes Volume 1	1992	
"Don't Read the Living Bible"		Monsters	2006	
"Don't Turn It Up"	Norman	The Final Concert	2004	70 Miles from Lebanon
"Don't Wanna Be Like You"	Norman	Collaborator: The Essential - Volume 4	2002	Safecracking
"Don't You Wanna Talk About It"	Norman	Stop This Flight	1985	The Best of Larry Norman; On the Prowl; Monsters
"Dove L'etude (Top 40 Survey #2)"	Norman	Gathered Moments (Somewhere in This Lifetime)	1998	
"Down the Line"	Norman	A Moment in Time	1994	American Roots; Liberator: The Essential - Volume 3
"Down to the Water" (with Wondergroove)		Hi-Fi Demonstration Record (re-release)	2000	Collaborator: The Essential - Volume 4; Safecracking
"A Dream Come True" (instrumental)	Norman	Rehearsal for Reality	1986	
"Dreams on a Grey Afternoon" (instrumental)	Norman	In Another Land (CD release)	1993	
"Drive Me"		4 Track Motorola '66 Corolla	2005	
"Drum L'etudes" (instrumental)	Norman	Labor of Love	1982	Quiet Night
"Ed Sullivan and the Beatles"		The Norman Invasion	2004	
"Elvis Has Left the Building"	Norman	A Moment in Time	1994	Rough Diamonds, Precious Jewels (The Belfast Bootlegs)
"The End"		The Final Concert	2004	70 Miles from Lebanon
"Endless Life of Dreams"	Norman	The Vineyard	1999	Tourniquet; Infiltrator: The Essential - Volume 6; Safecracking; The Girl with the Golden Hair
"The Epic" (People!)	Norman; Dennis Fridkin	I Love You	1968	I Love You Korea; The Best of People! Vol. 1
"Eternal Struggle"	Norman	In Another Land (25th Anniversary Edition)	1999	Sticks & Stones
"Eve of Destruction"	P. F. Sloan	Non-album single	2004	The Salt of the Sea
"Even If You Don't Believe"	Norman	Bootleg	1972	The Best of Larry Norman - Volume 2; Agitator: The Essential - Volume 2; The Cottage Tapes - Book Two; Slinky
"Everybody Work" (part of medley "Everybody Work" / "Twist and Shout" / "Shout")	Norman	"Stop This Flight" / "Everybody Work" (12-inch single)	1985	Live at Flevo; The Gospel Rock Collection; Sticks & Stones; Rough Diamonds, Precious Jewels (The Belfast Bootlegs); Road Rage; The Very Best of Larry Norman Vol. 2; Liberator: The Essential - Volume 3; Face to Face; Safecracking; Pot O' Gold; You Are Not My People
"Everything Is Broken"		Sessions	2004	The Hum of the Diesels
"Excerpt from a Young Lions Session, 1985" (short instrumental)	Norman	Rough Street Love Letter	1999	
"Face the Wind"		Magnetic Real: The Living Room Tapes - Vol. 1 (1963)	2011	Magnetic Real: The Living Room Tapes - 1963
"Falling Asleep"		Motorola Corolla 2	2007	
"Farther Along"		Sessions	2004	
"Farther On"	Randy Stonehill; Tom Howard	Labor of Love	1982	Quiet Night
"Father of All"	Norman	Father Touch	1999	Tourniquet; Collaborator: The Essential - Volume 4; Underground Manouevers; "The Road That Leads to Home" (single)
"Feed the Poor"	Norman	Copper Wires	1998	The Vineyard; Father Touch; Tourniquet; Collaborator: The Essential - Volume 4; The Norman Invasion; Tactical Maneuvers
"Feeling So Bad" (a.k.a. "What a Day")	Norman	Something New Under the Son	1981	Blarney Stone; Rough Diamonds, Precious Jewels (The Belfast Bootlegs); Instigator: The Essential - Volume 1; Frisbee; Slinky; Maximum Son: The Anthology Series; Pot O' Gold
"Finchian Etude" (instrumental)	Norman	Stop This Flight	1985	
"The First Noel"	Traditional	Christmastime	2003	
"The First Time"		The Norman Invasion	2004	
"Fly, Fly, Fly" (a.k.a. "Meet Me at the Airport", "Song for Pamela")	Norman	So Long Ago the Garden	1973	"I've Got to Learn to Live Without You" / "Song for Pamela (Fly, Fly, Fly)" (single); Larry Norman (Starstorm); The Israel Tapes; Rough Mix Audio Pack
"Fly Me to the Moon" (spoken, but containing "Fly Me To The Moon" and "I'm In The Mood For Love")	Bart Howard; Dorothy Fields; Jimmy McHugh	In the Beginning	2000	
"Follow the Drinking Gourd"	Norman	The Final Concert	2004	70 Miles from Lebanon; Sessions
"Forever and a Day"		Dust on Rust	2006	Magnetic Real: The Living Room Tapes - Vol. 1 (1963); Magnetic Real: The Living Room Tapes - 1963
"Forget Your Hexagram"	Norman	Upon This Rock	1969	The Son Worshipers; The Israel Tapes; The Rock Revival Vol. 2: Remembering the Future; Sonrise; The Best of Larry Norman - Volume 1; Rough Diamonds, Precious Jewels (The Belfast Bootlegs); Instigator: The Essential - Volume 1; Underground Manouevers
"Fountain of Sorrow"		Dust on Rust	2006	
"Friendship's End" (with Beam)	Joel Pierce	Breathe In, Breathe Out	1998	Father Touch
"Funeral Procession"		Pot O' Gold	2007	
"The Future Is Here" (instrumental)	Norman	Father Touch	1999	
"Galaxy" (instrumental)	Norman	Down Under (But Not Out)	1986	Rehearsal for Reality; Emancipator: The Essential - Volume 5
"Gene Vincent and Russia"		Live at the Cavern Club	2009	
"The Gentle Faith" (with Randy Stonehill)		Ten Times Two: Tour Of the Americas	2005	
"Giant Man" (People!)		Non-album single	1968	Down Under (But Not Out) (Illegal Noise CD); The Best of People! Vol. 2
"The Girl with the Golden Hair"		The Girl with the Golden Hair	2011	Sierra Romeo
"Give It Up" (instrumental)	Norman	Down Under (But Not Out) (Royal Music)	1986	Liberator: The Essential - Volume 3; Face to Face
"God Part III" (early title: "God Part 2")	Norman	Stranded in Babylon	1991	Footprints in the Sand; Omega Europa; Shouting in the Storm; The Vineyard; In the Beginning; Rough Diamonds, Precious Jewels (The Belfast Bootlegs); Agitator: The Essential - Volume 2; Collaborator: The Essential - Volume 4; Solid Rock Sampler 1; The Very Best of Larry Norman Vol. 2; The Final Concert; 70 Miles from Lebanon; Live at the Elsinore; The Norman Conquest; How Then Shall We Live?; Live at the Cavern Club
"God Save the Queen" (instrumental)	traditional	Rough Diamonds, Precious Jewels (The Belfast Bootlegs)	2001	
"Gonna Make It to Broadway"		Conscription 2007	2007	
"Goodbye, Farewell"	Norman	A Moment in Time (cassette)	1994	Footprints in the Sand; Omega Europa; Shouting in the Storm; Breathe In, Breathe Out; The Best of Larry Norman - Volume 2; Rough Diamonds, Precious Jewels (The Belfast Bootlegs); Emancipator: The Essential - Volume 5; Digital (Dutch) Masters; Tactical Maneuvers
"Gotta Travel On"		Magnetic Real: The Living Room Tapes - Vol. 1 (1963)	2011	Magnetic Real: The Living Room Tapes - 1963
"The Great American Novel"	Norman	Only Visiting This Planet	1972	Larry Norman (Starstorm); Come as a Child; The Vineyard; Rough Diamonds, Precious Jewels (The Belfast Bootlegs); Agitator: The Essential - Volume 2; Live at Cornerstone; The Very Best of Larry Norman Vol. 1; The Final Concert; 70 Miles from Lebanon; Hattem; Maximum Planet: The Anthology Series; Live at the Elsinore; Rehearsal for Reality (bonus track); The Norman Conquest; Monsters; Pot O' Gold; Rebel Poet, Jukebox Balladeer: The Anthology; Solid Rock Army 2010 Disc 002
"Ha Ha World"	Norman	Upon This Rock	1969	Bootleg; We Wish You a Larry Christmas; Instigator: The Essential - Volume 1; Frisbee; Slinky; Rebel Poet, Jukebox Balladeer: The Anthology
"Half Day in Carshalton"		The Norman Invasion	2004	
"Hallelujah" (with The Judaic Vikings)	Norman	Omega Europa	1994	Heartland Junction
"Hard Luck Bad News"	Norman	Something New Under the Son	1981	Down Under (But Not Out) (Royal Music); Footprints in the Sand; Sticks & Stones; Instigator: The Essential - Volume 1; Maximum Son: The Anthology Series
"Hasty Heart" (People!)	Norman	Both Sides of People	1969	Down Under (But Not Out); We Wish You a Larry Christmas; The Best of People! Vol. 1; People! The Reunion Concert 2006
"He Gives Us All His Love"	Randy Newman	Streams of White Light Into Darkened Corners	1977	
"He Is a Friend" (with Randy Stonehill)	Norman	Emancipator: The Essential - Volume 5	2004	Ten Times Two: Tour Of the Americas
"He Really Loves You"	Norman	The Best of the Second Trilogy	1988	Home at Last; Live at Flevo; Infiltrator: The Essential - Volume 6
"He's Got the Whole World"	traditional	Bootleg (cassette)	1988	
"He's the One"	Norman	Bootleg (cassette)	1988	Where The Woodbine Twineth; The Cottage Tapes, Book One
"Head Over Heals"		Magnetic Real: The Living Room Tapes - Vol. 3 (1963)	2013	Magnetic Real: The Living Room Tapes - 1963
"Heat Lock" (with Randy Stonehill)		Ten Times Two: Tour Of the Americas	2005	
"Heaven Wants to Bless You"	Norman	Shouting in the Storm	1998	Copper Wires
"Her Hand"		Magnetic Real: The Living Room Tapes - Vol. 4 (1963)	2013	Magnetic Real: The Living Room Tapes - 1963
"Here Comes the Ice Cream Man"		Archive	2018	
"Here Comes the King"	Norman	Home at Last	1989	The Best of Larry Norman - Volume 2; Liberator: The Essential - Volume 3
"Hey Sweetheart" (a.k.a. "Sweetheart") (People!)		Both Sides of People	1969	4 Track Motorola '66 Corolla; The Best of People! Vol. 2; People! The Reunion Concert 2006
"Hide His Heart"	Norman	Stranded in Babylon	1991	Infiltrator: The Essential - Volume 6
"Higher Calling"	Tom Howard	Labor of Love	1982	
"Hound of Heaven" (with Daniel Amos)	Terry Scott Taylor	Horrendous Disc (CD re-release) (Daniel Amos album)	1999	When Worlds Collide: A Tribute to Daniel Amos and the Music of Terry Scott Taylor
"The Hour That the Ship Comes In"		Dust on Rust	2006	
"How I Lost My Life and Found My Soul"	Norman	Rehearsal for Reality (re-release)	2005	
"Hungarian Rhapsody"		The Best of People! Vol. 2	2006	
"Hungarian Rhaps #2"		4 Track Motorola '66 Corolla	2005	
"Hymn to the Last Generation"	Norman	In Another Land	1976	The Very Best of Larry Norman Vol. 2; Liberator: The Essential - Volume 3; In Another Land: The Missing Pieces; Sixty - The Trilogy Concert
"I Ain't Gonna Sing the Blues No More"	Norman	Where The Woodbine Twineth; The Cottage Tapes, Book One	2000	
"I Am a Pilgrim"	traditional	Copper Wires	1998	The Hum of the Diesels
"I Am a Servant"	Norman	In Another Land	1976	"UFO" / "I Am a Servant" (single); Live at Flevo (CD); Sonrise; The Vineyard; Rough Diamonds, Precious Jewels (The Belfast Bootlegs); Instigator: The Essential - Volume 1; The Very Best of Larry Norman Vol. 1; Snowblind; Frisbee; Siege at Elsinore; Slinky; In Another Land: The Missing Pieces; Sixty - The Trilogy Concert; Live at the Cavern Club; "Lost Unto This World" (single)
"I Am Is" (poem, spoken)	Norman	The Vineyard	1999	Rough Diamonds, Precious Jewels (The Belfast Bootlegs)
"I Am the Six O'Clock News" (a.k.a. "Six O'Clock News")	Norman	Street Level (limited edition)	1970	Only Visiting This Planet; The Israel Tapes; Live at Cornerstone; The Very Best of Larry Norman Vol. 1; "The Six O'Clock News" (CD single); Maximum Planet: The Anthology Series; Sixty - The Trilogy Concert; Rebel Poet, Jukebox Balladeer: The Anthology
"I Am Waiting"	Mick Jagger; Keith Richards	Streams of White Light Into Darkened Corners (Phydeaux cassette)	1988	
"I Am Your Friend" (sung by Sarah Finch)	Tom Howard	Letter of the Law	1982	
"I Call Her Doctor"		Conscription 2007	2007	Sierra Romeo
"I Can't Take It Anymore"		Covert Field Report	2009	Sierra Romeo
"I Don't Believe in Miracles" (a.k.a. "Miracles")	Norman	Upon This Rock	1969	Bootleg; Children of Sorrow; Instigator: The Essential - Volume 1; Restless in Manhattan '72; The Norman Invasion; Frisbee; Siege at Elsinore; Slinky
"I Don't Wanna Lose You" (a.k.a. "Idowanna Lose U")	Norman	Street Level (limited edition)	1970	Larry Norman (Starstorm); Quiet Night; Where The Woodbine Twineth; The Cottage Tapes, Book One; Infiltrator: The Essential - Volume 6; 4 Track Motorola '66 Corolla; Frisbee; Slinky; Archive
"I Feel Like Dying"	Norman	Something New Under the Son	1981	"I Feel Like Dying" / "Hold On" (single); Larry Norman and His Friends on Tour; Rehearsal for Reality; Footprints in the Sand; Sticks & Stones; The Very Best of Larry Norman Vol. 2; Maximum Son: The Anthology Series
"I Found Love"	Randy Stonehill; Tom Howard	Letter of the Law	1982	Quiet Night
"I Got a Letter Today from the President" (a.k.a. "Letter from the President") (The Flies)	Norman; Gary Tigerman; Michael Weston	Non-album single	1969	Down Under (But Not Out); We Wish You a Larry Christmas
"I Hope I'll See You in Heaven"	Norman	Come as a Child	1983	Stop This Flight; Down Under (But Not Out); The Best of Larry Norman; Totally Unplugged; Footprints in the Sand; The Vineyard; So Long Ago the Garden (2008 CD); Rough Diamonds, Precious Jewels (The Belfast Bootlegs); Snowblind; Ten Times Two: Tour Of the Americas; Face to Face; Snapshots from the '77 World Tour; Wounded Lion; Monsters; Sixty - The Trilogy Concert; The Colossus of Roads
"I Love You" (People!)	Chris White	I Love You	1968	The Israel Tapes; Down Under (But Not Out); Copper Wires; We Wish You a Larry Christmas; I Love You Korea; The Best of People! Vol. 1; People! The Reunion Concert 2006; Rebel Poet, Jukebox Balladeer: The Anthology
"I Love You"	Norman; Randy Stonehill	In Another Land	1976	The Roaring 20; The Israel Tapes; Rock, Scissors et Papier; Solid Rock Sampler 1; Emancipator: The Essential - Volume 5; In Another Land: The Missing Pieces
"I Need a Touch"	Norman	Father Touch	1999	Tourniquet (bonus track)
"I Think He's Hiding"	Randy Newman	Streams of White Light Into Darkened Corners	1977	
"I Think I Love You"	Norman	Bootleg	1972	Instigator: The Essential - Volume 1
"I Wanna Hold Your Hand" (with Randy Stonehill)		Ten Times Two: Tour Of the Americas	2005	
"I Want It All" (with Wondergroove)		Hi-Fi Demonstration Record (re-release)	2000	Collaborator: The Essential - Volume 4; Siege at Elsinore; Safecracking
"I Want You to Know"		Motorola Corolla 2	2007	
"I Will Survive"	Norman	Stranded in Babylon	1991	Totally Unplugged; Collaborator: The Essential - Volume 4; Siege at Elsinore (bonus track)
"I Wish We'd All Been Ready"	Norman	Upon This Rock	1969	Street Level; Only Visiting This Planet; "Reader's Digest" / "I Wish We'd All Been Ready" (single); Roll Away the Stone (and Listen to the Rock); Larry Norman and His Friends on Tour; Jesus Christus: Hoffnung für die 80er Jahre; White Blossoms from Black Roots; Live at Flevo; Breathe In, Breathe Out; The Vineyard; In the Beginning; Rough Diamonds, Precious Jewels (The Belfast Bootlegs); Agitator: The Essential - Volume 2; Solid Rock Sampler 1; Live at Cornerstone; History Makers - The Best of Christian Pop Vol.1 1970-1985; Restless in Manhattan '72; The Very Best of Larry Norman Vol. 1; Road Rage; The Final Concert; 70 Miles from Lebanon; Heartland Junction; Maximum Planet: The Anthology Series; Live at the Elsinore; Wounded Lion; Monsters; Pot O' Gold; Sixty - The Trilogy Concert; Rebel Poet, Jukebox Balladeer: The Anthology; Solid Rock Army 2010 Disc 002
"I'm a Prisoner of Your Love"		Motorola Corolla 2	2007	
"I'm Gonna Write a Song About You"	Norman	Down Under (But Not Out)	1986	Rehearsal for Reality; The Best of Larry Norman
"I'm in the Mood for Love"		Flevo Totaal Festival - Live Tapes Volume 1	1992	
"I'm Not Crying Anymore"		Face to Face	2007	
"I've Got to Learn to Live Without You"	Norman	Only Visiting This Planet	1972	"Reader's Digest" / "I've Got to Learn to Live Without You" (single); "I've Got to Learn to Live Without You" / "The Outlaw" (single); "I've Got to Learn to Live Without You" / "Song for Pamela (Fly, Fly, Fly)" (single); Larry Norman (Starstorm); Survivor: The Essential - Volume 7; Maximum Planet: The Anthology Series; Sixty - The Trilogy Concert; Rebel Poet, Jukebox Balladeer: The Anthology
"I've Got You on My Mind" (People!)	Norman	Both Sides of People	1969	Down Under (But Not Out); We Wish You a Larry Christmas; The Best of People! Vol. 1; People! The Reunion Concert 2006
"I've Searched All Around" (a.k.a. "I've Searched All Around the World") (Larry Norman & White Light)	Norman	Street Level (underground edition)	1971	Bootleg; Beginnings; In Another Land; The Israel Tapes; Roll Away the Stone (and Listen to the Rock); Down Under (But Not Out); Thank You for the Music Volume 2; Live at the Mac; Where The Woodbine Twineth; The Cottage Tapes, Book One; Blarney Stone; Rough Diamonds, Precious Jewels (The Belfast Bootlegs); Agitator: The Essential - Volume 2; Solid Rock Sampler 1; Live at Cornerstone; The Very Best of Larry Norman Vol. 1; The Cottage Tapes - Book Two; Snapshots from the '77 World Tour; Slinky; In Another Land: The Missing Pieces; Sixty - The Trilogy Concert; Rebel Poet, Jukebox Balladeer: The Anthology
"If God Is My Father"	Norman	In Another Land	1976	Jubilation, Too!; Larry Norman (Starstorm); So Long Ago the Garden (CD); Live at the Mac; The Best of Larry Norman - Volume 1; Survivor: The Essential - Volume 7; On the Prowl; Heartland Junction; Maximum Garden: The Anthology Series; Siege at Elsinore; Underground Manouevers; Snapshots from the '77 World Tour; In Another Land: The Missing Pieces; Sixty - The Trilogy Concert; Solid Rock Army 2010 Disc 002
"If I Got My Ticket" (a.k.a. "Lord, If I Got My Ticket Can I Ride")		The Story of the Tune	1983	Flevo Totaal Festival - Live Tapes Volume 1; Rough Diamonds, Precious Jewels (The Belfast Bootlegs); American Roots; Snapshots from the '77 World Tour; Maximum Son: The Anthology Series
"If I Were a Singer"	Norman; Steve Camp	Gathered Moments (Somewhere in This Lifetime)	1998	The Vineyard; Rough Diamonds, Precious Jewels (The Belfast Bootlegs)
"If the Bombs Fall" (a.k.a. "When the Bombs Fall")	Norman	Back to America	1985	Down Under (But Not Out); The Best of Larry Norman; The Vineyard; The Best of Larry Norman - Volume 2; Rough Diamonds, Precious Jewels (The Belfast Bootlegs); Snowblind; On the Prowl; Monsters; Live at the Cavern Club; Digital (Dutch) Masters
"If You Don't Love the Lord, You'll Fall"	Norman	Rehearsal for Reality	1986	Footprints in the Sand; Gathered Moments (Somewhere in This Lifetime); Rough Street Love Letter; Survivor: The Essential - Volume 7; Liberator: The Essential - Volume 3
"If You'll Be My Woman"	Norman	Rough Diamonds, Precious Jewels (The Belfast Bootlegs)	2001	Live at the Cavern Club
"In My Life"		Live at the Cavern Club	2009	
"In the Garden" (duet with Andy Pratt)	Bob Dylan	Rock, Scissors et Papier	2003	
"In the Garden (How It Could Have Been)"	Norman	Copper Wires	1998	Collaborator: The Essential - Volume 4; Underground Manouevers
"In the World but Not of the World" (with Solveig Leithaug)	Solveig Leithaug	In the World (Solveig Leithaug album)	1986	Barking at the Oops! Rough Mix 3
"Introduction a la Compere"		The Norman Invasion	2004	
"Iron and Steel"	Tom Howard	Letter of the Law	1982	Quiet Night
"Iron Man Takes the 'A' Train" (instrumental)	Norman	Father Touch	1999	
"Is God Dead?" (with Beam)	Norman	Breathe In, Breathe Out	1998	Emancipator: The Essential - Volume 5
"It's Alright" (with Beam)	Norman	Breathe In, Breathe Out	1998	Tactical Maneuvers
"It's Finally Over"		Tactical Maneuvers	2009	Sierra Romeo
"It's Gettin' So You Can't Trust Nobody"	Norman	Rough Diamonds, Precious Jewels (The Belfast Bootlegs)	2001	
"It's Only Today That Counts"	Norman	Back to America	1985	Something New Under the Son (CD release); Rehearsal for Reality; The Best of the Second Trilogy; White Blossoms from Black Roots; Live at Flevo (CD); Footprints in the Sand; Omega Europa; The Norman Invasion; Emancipator: The Essential - Volume 5; Wounded Lion; The Colossus of Roads; Solid Rock Army 2010 Disc 001
"It's the Same Old Story" (a.k.a. "The Same Old Story")	Norman	So Long Ago the Garden	1973	"It's the Same Old Story" / "Christmas Time" (single); Larry Norman (Starstorm); Infiltrator: The Essential - Volume 6; Maximum Garden: The Anthology Series; Sixty - The Trilogy Concert
"Jammin' the Transmission"		Face to Face	2007	
"Jericho" (with Randy Stonehill)		Ten Times Two: Tour Of the Americas	2005	
"Jesus Christ"	Woody Guthrie	Invitation Only	2003	
"Jesus Freak"	Toby McKeehan; Mark Heimermann	Shouting in the Storm	1998	Breathe In, Breathe Out; The Mother of All Tribute Albums; Father Touch; You Are Not My People; The Hum of the Diesels
"Jesus Is God"	Norman	Collaborator: The Essential - Volume 4	2002	Safecracking
"Jesus Is the Song Inside of Me"	Norman	Quiet Night	1984	
"Jesus on the Mainline"	traditional	American Roots	2003	
"Jingle Bell Rock"	Joe Beal; Jim Boothe	Christmastime	2003	Shake Your Rattle and Crawl: Larry Norman Songs For Kids
"Jonny's Blues" (instrumental)	Jon Linn	Roll Away the Stone (and Listen to the Rock)	1980	Underground Manouevers
"Julie"		Magnetic Real: The Living Room Tapes - Vol. 3 (1963)	2013	Magnetic Real: The Living Room Tapes - 1963
"Just Like a Woman"	Bob Dylan	Barking at the Ants	1981	Barking at the Oops! Rough Mix 3; The Hum of the Diesels
"Killing the Dragon"		4 Track Motorola '66 Corolla	2005	
"Kimberly"		Magnetic Real: The Living Room Tapes - Vol. 2 (1963)	2012	Magnetic Real: The Living Room Tapes - 1963
"King of the Contradanza"		Digital (Dutch) Masters	2011	
"Knockin' on Heaven's Door"	Bob Dylan	Sessions	2004	The Hum of the Diesels; Archive
"Kulderachna"	Norman	Instigator: The Essential - Volume 1	2003	
"The Last Supper"	Norman	Upon This Rock	1969	We Wish You a Larry Christmas
"Lay My Burden Down" (a.k.a. "God Is in the House")	Norman	A Moment in Time	1994	
"Leave It Up to God to Handle"	Norman	A Moment in Time	1994	American Roots; Liberator: The Essential - Volume 3; The Norman Invasion
"Leaving the Past Behind"	Norman	Something New Under the Son	1981	Larry Norman and His Friends on Tour; Footprints in the Sand; Blarney Stone; Rough Diamonds, Precious Jewels (The Belfast Bootlegs); Maximum Son: The Anthology Series
"Leida, Harjo"	Norman	Blarney Stone	2000	Rough Diamonds, Precious Jewels (The Belfast Bootlegs)
"Let It All Fall Down"		Rough Mix Audio Pack	2009	The Salt of the Sea
"Let It Be"	John Lennon; Paul McCartney	Streams of White Light Into Darkened Corners	1977	
"Let It Go"	Norman; Charles Norman	Shouting in the Storm	1998	Breathe In, Breathe Out; The Vineyard
"Let Me Down Easy"		Conscription 2007	2007	Sierra Romeo
"Let My Love Go"		4 Track Motorola '66 Corolla	2005	
"Let That Tape Keep Rolling"	Norman	Greenbelt Live!	1979	Roll Away the Stone (and Listen to the Rock); Something New Under the Son; In Another Land (CD); Live at the Mac; Blarney Stone; Instigator: The Essential - Volume 1; The Very Best of Larry Norman Vol. 2; Snapshots from the '77 World Tour; Live at Greenbelt; Maximum Son: The Anthology Series
"Let the Master Make It Right"	Tom Howard	Labor of Love	1982	Quiet Night
"Let the Rain Fall Down"	Norman	Stranded in Babylon	1991	Totally Unplugged; Footprints in the Sand; Shouting in the Storm; Rough Diamonds, Precious Jewels (The Belfast Bootlegs); Collaborator: The Essential - Volume 4; Road Rage; The Very Best of Larry Norman Vol. 2; Live at the Elsinore; Siege at Elsinore; You Are Not My People
"Let There Be Peace on Earth"	Jill Jackson-Miller; Sy Miller	Christmastime	2003	
"Letter from Kathy"		Magnetic Real: The Living Room Tapes - Vol. 1 (1963)	2011	Magnetic Real: The Living Room Tapes - 1963
"Letters to the Church" (a.k.a. "Letter to a Friend")	Norman	Back to America	1985	Home at Last; Live at Flevo (CD); Rough Street Love Letter; Liberator: The Essential - Volume 3; Emancipator: The Essential - Volume 5; Underground Manouevers; Solid Rock Army 2010 Disc 001
"Letting Go"	Norman	On the Prowl	2004	
"Like a Rolling Stone" (with Beam)	Bob Dylan	Breathe In, Breathe Out	1998	
"Living in the 20th Century"	Norman	The Best of the Second Trilogy	1988	White Blossoms from Black Roots; Collaborator: The Essential - Volume 4
"Lonely Boy"	Norman	Home at Last	1989	Footprints in the Sand; Instigator: The Essential - Volume 1; Shake Your Rattle and Crawl: Larry Norman Songs For Kids; Magnetic Real: The Living Room Tapes - Vol. 3 (1963); Magnetic Real: The Living Room Tapes - 1963
"Lonely by Myself"	Norman	So Long Ago the Garden	1973	The Israel Tapes; White Blossoms from Black Roots; Live at the Mac ("Exit"); The Best of Larry Norman - Volume 1; Agitator: The Essential - Volume 2; Instigator: The Essential - Volume 1; The Very Best of Larry Norman Vol. 1; Maximum Garden: The Anthology Series; Frisbee; Snapshots from the '77 World Tour; Slinky; Sixty - The Trilogy Concert
"Lonely Theme"		4 Track Motorola '66 Corolla	2005	
"Long Hard Road"	Norman; Dizzy Reed	A Moment in Time	1994	Rough Diamonds, Precious Jewels (The Belfast Bootlegs)
"Looking for the Footprints"	Norman	White Blossoms from Black Roots	1989	In Another Land (CD); Sticks & Stones; Instigator: The Essential - Volume 1; The Very Best of Larry Norman Vol. 1; In Another Land: The Missing Pieces
"Looking Good"		4 Track Motorola '66 Corolla	2005	
"Lost Unto This World"		Non-album single	2007	The Salt of the Sea
"Lounge Lizard Sings Raindrops"	Norman	Rock, Scissors et Papier	2003	
"Love Is a Commitment"	Norman	Stranded in Babylon	1991	Spark Collection Volume 1; Infiltrator: The Essential - Volume 6
"Love Is the Reason" (with Beam)	Norman; Charles Norman	Breathe In, Breathe Out	1998	The Vineyard; Solid Rock Army 2010 Disc 001
"A Love Like Yours" (a.k.a. "With a Love Like Yours")	Norman	Bootleg	1972	The Best of Larry Norman - Volume 2; Instigator: The Essential - Volume 1; The Cottage Tapes - Book Two
"Love Medley"		Underground Manouevers	2005	
"Love on Haight Street"	Norman	The Vineyard	1999	Rough Street Love Letter; The Norman Conquest; Archive
"Lucky John" (People!)		Both Sides of People	1969	
"Lugoj" (a.k.a. "Children of Lugoj")	Norman	Blarney Stone	2000	Tourniquet (bonus track); Rough Diamonds, Precious Jewels (The Belfast Bootlegs); Rock, Scissors et Papier; Liberator: The Essential - Volume 3; The Norman Invasion
"Magical Misery Tour"		The Norman Invasion	2004	
"Making Noise"		Rough Mix Audio Pack	2009	
"The Man from Galilee"	Norman	The Best of the Second Trilogy	1988	White Blossoms from Black Roots; The Best of Larry Norman - Volume 2; Rough Diamonds, Precious Jewels (The Belfast Bootlegs); The Very Best of Larry Norman Vol. 1; Emancipator: The Essential - Volume 5; Conscription 2007; Shake Your Rattle and Crawl: Larry Norman Songs For Kids
"Man of Constant Sorrow"	traditional	American Roots	2003	The Colossus of Roads
"Mansion on the Sand"	Tom Howard	Labor of Love	1982	
"Marvin, David, Walter, Lincoln Jones"	Norman	Rough Diamonds, Precious Jewels (The Belfast Bootlegs)	2001	The Norman Invasion; How Then Shall We Live?
"Medley: Carol of the Bells and Dance of the Sugar Plum Fairies (from The Nutcracker Suite)"	Mykola Leontovych; Peter J. Wilhousky; Pyotr Ilyich Tchaikovsky	Christmastime	2003	
"Messiah"	Norman	Stop This Flight	1985	Back to America; Live at Flevo; The Best of Larry Norman; Rough Diamonds, Precious Jewels (The Belfast Bootlegs); Survivor: The Essential - Volume 7; Solid Rock Sampler 1; Road Rage; The Very Best of Larry Norman Vol. 2; Snowblind; On the Prowl; The Norman Invasion; Heartland Junction; Rehearsal for Reality (bonus track); Siege at Elsinore; Underground Manouevers; Face to Face; Monsters; You Are Not My People; Digital (Dutch) Masters
"Moonshine"	Norman	Gathered Moments (Somewhere in This Lifetime)	1998	
"More Than a Dream"		Rehearsal for Reality	1986	Rough Street Love Letter; Sticks & Stones; Underground Manouevers; The Hum of the Diesels
"Moses in the Wilderness" (a.k.a. "Moses," "Moses: A Blues Recital and Meditation of 40 Years on the Road")	Norman	Upon This Rock	1969	We Wish You a Larry Christmas; In the Beginning; The Best of Larry Norman - Volume 1; Rough Diamonds, Precious Jewels (The Belfast Bootlegs); Instigator: The Essential - Volume 1; Snowblind; Heartland Junction; Frisbee; Slinky; Monsters; Rebel Poet, Jukebox Balladeer: The Anthology; Magnetic Real: The Living Room Tapes - Vol. 1 (1963); Shake Your Rattle and Crawl: Larry Norman Songs For Kids; Magnetic Real: The Living Room Tapes - 1963; Archive
"Most Likely You Go Your Way and I'll Go Mine"	Bob Dylan	Archive	2018	
"Mumbling Man"	Norman	Blarney Stone	2000	
"My Feet Are on the Rock" (a.k.a. "I Dance Before the Lord," "Dance Before the Throne," "Rubie")	Norman	The Best of the Second Trilogy	1988	Home at Last; Live at Flevo; Children of Sorrow; An Audience of One; Gathered Moments (Somewhere in This Lifetime); The Vineyard; Sticks & Stones; The Best of Larry Norman - Volume 2; Rough Diamonds, Precious Jewels (The Belfast Bootlegs); Rock, Scissors et Papier; Live at Cornerstone; American Roots; Road Rage; Liberator: The Essential - Volume 3; The Final Concert; 70 Miles from Lebanon; The Norman Invasion; Heartland Junction; You Are Not My People; Digital (Dutch) Masters
"My Mind's Made Up"		Motorola Corolla 2	2007	
"My Soul Thirsts for You"		Barking at the Oops! Rough Mix 3	1990	
"My Sweet Lord"	George Harrison	Streams of White Light Into Darkened Corners	1977	
"Near"	Norman	Father Touch	1999	Tourniquet; Rough Diamonds, Precious Jewels (The Belfast Bootlegs); Rock, Scissors et Papier; Safecracking; Pot O' Gold
"Nickel in the Pasture"		Motorola Corolla 2	2007	
"Nightmare" (a.k.a. "Nightmare #71")	Norman	So Long Ago the Garden	1973	Come as a Child; Agitator: The Essential - Volume 2; Maximum Garden: The Anthology Series; Frisbee; Siege at Elsinore; Ten Times Two: Tour Of the Americas; Slinky; Sixty - The Trilogy Concert; Rebel Poet, Jukebox Balladeer: The Anthology
"Nightmare #49 (Part 1)"	Norman	The Best of the Second Trilogy	1988	Home at Last; Live at Flevo; Footprints in the Sand; Rough Diamonds, Precious Jewels (The Belfast Bootlegs); Emancipator: The Essential - Volume 5
"Nightmare #49 (Part 2)" (instrumental)	Norman	Home at Last	1989	
"Nightmare #97" (a.k.a. "Larry Norman's 97th Nightmare")	Norman	Something New Under the Son	1981	Maximum Son: The Anthology Series
"No Change Can Attend" (a.k.a. "No Change Can Attend Jehovah's Love")	Norman	Bootleg	1972	The Best of Larry Norman - Volume 1
"No More LSD for Me" (Larry Norman & White Light)	Norman	Street Level (underground edition)	1971	The Vineyard; Rough Diamonds, Precious Jewels (The Belfast Bootlegs)
"Nobody's Fault But Mine"		Dust on Rust	2006	
"Not Afraid to Die"		Magnetic Real: The Living Room Tapes - Vol. 2 (1963)	2012	Magnetic Real: The Living Room Tapes - 1963
"A Note from Mr. God"	Norman	Larry Norman and His Friends on Tour	1981	Barking at the Oops! Rough Mix 3; Children of Sorrow; The Vineyard; Sticks & Stones; Rough Diamonds, Precious Jewels (The Belfast Bootlegs); The Colossus of Roads; Shake Your Rattle and Crawl: Larry Norman Songs For Kids
"Nothing Can Stop the Elephants" (People!)	Dennis Fridkin; Albert Ribisi	I Love You	1968	I Love You Korea; The Best of People! Vol. 2
"Nothing Really Changes"	Norman	Upon This Rock	1969	We Wish You a Larry Christmas; Instigator: The Essential - Volume 1; Siege at Elsinore; Motorola Corolla 2
"Now Is the Time"		4 Track Motorola '66 Corolla	2005	
"O Holy Night"	Adolphe Adam; Placide Cappeau	Christmastime	2003	
"Oh Death, Where Is Thy Sting?"		Maximum Son: The Anthology Series	2006	
"Oh, How I Love You"	Norman	Only Visiting This Planet	1972	Home at Last
"Oh Little Sister"	Norman	Copper Wires	1998	The Vineyard
"Oh Little Town of Bethlehem"	Phillips Brooks	Christmastime	2003	
"Oh Lydia"	Norman	Stranded in Babylon	1991	Infiltrator: The Essential - Volume 6; Magnetic Real: The Living Room Tapes - Vol. 4 (1963); Magnetic Real: The Living Room Tapes - 1963
"Oil in My Lamp"	traditional	Copper Wires	1998	Shake Your Rattle and Crawl: Larry Norman Songs For Kids
"One More Reason"	Tom Howard	Labor of Love	1982	
"One Star Remains" (a.k.a. "My Man on Love," "My Man on God")	Judee Sill	Survivor: The Essential - Volume 7	2002	The Hum of the Diesels
"One Way" (Larry Norman & White Light)	Norman	Street Level (underground edition)	1971	Bootleg; Beginnings; In Another Land; "The Rock That Doesn't Roll" / "Diamonds/One Way" (promo single); An Audience of One; Sonrise; The Vineyard; Rough Diamonds, Precious Jewels (The Belfast Bootlegs); Agitator: The Essential - Volume 2; Restless in Manhattan '72; The Very Best of Larry Norman Vol. 2; Snowblind; Frisbee; Siege at Elsinore; Slinky; In Another Land: The Missing Pieces; How Then Shall We Live?; Sixty - The Trilogy Concert; Live at the Cavern Club
"The One Way Sign and PTL"		The Colossus of Roads	2008	
"Opposite Me" (People!)		Non-album single	1968	Down Under (But Not Out) (Illegal Noise CD); The Best of People! Vol. 2
"Organ Grinder" (People!)	Norman; Gene Mason	Non-album single	1967	Down Under (But Not Out) (Phydeaux cassette); We Wish You a Larry Christmas; The Best of People! Vol. 1
"Original Thanksgiving Melody"		Dust on Rust	2006	
"Out of My System"	Norman	Stop This Flight	1985	Down Under (But Not Out); White Blossoms from Black Roots; The Best of Larry Norman; Footprints in the Sand; Survivor: The Essential - Volume 7; On the Prowl; Monsters
"The Outlaw"	Norman	Only Visiting This Planet	1972	"I've Got to Learn to Live Without You" / "The Outlaw" (single); Come as a Child; White Blossoms from Black Roots; Live at Flevo (CD); Omega Europa; Live at the Mac; The Vineyard; In the Beginning; Rough Diamonds, Precious Jewels (The Belfast Bootlegs); The Very Best of Larry Norman Vol. 1; The Final Concert; 70 Miles from Lebanon; Emancipator: The Essential - Volume 5; Heartland Junction; Maximum Planet: The Anthology Series; Frisbee; Underground Manouevers; Snapshots from the '77 World Tour; Slinky; Wounded Lion; Pot O' Gold; The Colossus of Roads; Rebel Poet, Jukebox Balladeer: The Anthology; Live at the Cavern Club; Solid Rock Army 2010 Disc 002
"Pachelbel's Bombs"		Rough Mix Audio Pack	2009	
"Pardon Me"	Norman	Only Visiting This Planet	1972	Larry Norman (Starstorm); White Blossoms from Black Roots; Rough Diamonds, Precious Jewels (The Belfast Bootlegs); Instigator: The Essential - Volume 1; The Very Best of Larry Norman Vol. 1; The Norman Invasion; Maximum Planet: The Anthology Series; Siege at Elsinore; Ten Times Two: Tour Of the Americas; Sixty - The Trilogy Concert; Rebel Poet, Jukebox Balladeer: The Anthology
"Parson Brown"	Norman	Gathered Moments (Somewhere in This Lifetime)	1998	Rough Diamonds, Precious Jewels (The Belfast Bootlegs)
"Peace Pollution Revolution" (a.k.a. "Peacepollutionrevolution")	Norman	Street Level	1970	"Without Love" / "Peace, Pollution, Revolution" (single); So Long Ago the Garden (Phydeaux re-release); Come as a Child; Rough Diamonds, Precious Jewels (The Belfast Bootlegs); Agitator: The Essential - Volume 2; The Very Best of Larry Norman Vol. 1; The Cottage Tapes - Book Two; Maximum Garden: The Anthology Series; The Norman Conquest; Sixty - The Trilogy Concert; Rebel Poet, Jukebox Balladeer: The Anthology
"People Get Ready"	Curtis Mayfield	Copper Wires	1998	American Roots; The Hum of the Diesels
"People in My Past"	Norman	Agitator: The Essential - Volume 2	2002	
"Perfect World"	Norman	Collaborator: The Essential - Volume 4	2002	Safecracking
"Pianissimo Ridiculouso"	Norman	Restless in Manhattan '72	2003	
"Piano L'etudes" (instrumental)	Norman	Labor of Love	1982	Quiet Night
"Pirate Bill" (People!)		Both Sides of People	1969	
"Playing Checkers"	Norman	Snowblind	2004	
"Playing Monsters"		Monsters	2006	
"Poem" (spoken) (a.k.a. "First Day in Church")	Norman	Street Level	1970	
"Positively 4th Street"	Bob Dylan	Rock, Scissors et Papier	2003	Tactical Maneuvers; The Hum of the Diesels
"Positively Like a Servant"	Norman	Rock, Scissors et Papier	2003	Covert Field Report
"Postlude"	Norman	Upon This Rock	1969	We Wish You a Larry Christmas
"Practicing Harmony" (with Randy Stonehill)		The Colossus of Roads	2008	
"The Preacher and Rock 'n' Roll"		Flevo Totaal Festival - Live Tapes Volume 1	1992	
"Prelude"	Norman	Upon This Rock	1969	We Wish You a Larry Christmas
"Presence of the Lord"	Eric Clapton	Streams of White Light Into Darkened Corners	1977	
"The Price of Living"	Norman	Street Level (limited edition)	1970	
"Prince of Peace"	Leon Russell	Streams of White Light Into Darkened Corners	1977	
"Protect My Child"	Norman	Copper Wires	1998	The Vineyard; Collaborator: The Essential - Volume 4; The Girl with the Golden Hair; Sierra Romeo
"Put Your Hand in the Hand"	Gene MacLellan	Streams of White Light Into Darkened Corners	1977	
"Put Your Life Into His Hands" (a.k.a. "Put Your Life in Jesus' Nail Scarred Hands")	Norman	Something New Under the Son	1981	Larry Norman and His Friends on Tour; The Four Side Saga; Omega Europa; The Best of Larry Norman - Volume 1; American Roots; The Very Best of Larry Norman Vol. 2; Emancipator: The Essential - Volume 5; Heartland Junction; Maximum Son: The Anthology Series
"Queen Jane - Father of Day"		Dust on Rust	2006	
"Queen of the Rodeo"	Norman	Home at Last	1989	
"Quit Kicking My Dog" (a.k.a. "You Gotta Quit Kickin' My Dog Around")	Norman	Rough Diamonds, Precious Jewels (The Belfast Bootlegs)	2001	The Final Concert; 70 Miles from Lebanon
"Rachael and Me"	Kristy Norman	Rough Diamonds, Precious Jewels (The Belfast Bootlegs)	2001	Rock, Scissors et Papier; Shake Your Rattle and Crawl: Larry Norman Songs For Kids
"Raindrops" (B.J. Thomas parody)	Norman	Sticks & Stones	2000	
"Rap"	Norman	Live at Cornerstone	2003	
"Reader's Digest"	Norman	Only Visiting This Planet	1972	"Reader's Digest" / "I've Got to Learn to Live Without You" (single); "Reader's Digest" / "I Wish We'd All Been Ready" (single); Omega Europa; The Vineyard; In the Beginning; Rough Diamonds, Precious Jewels (The Belfast Bootlegs); Agitator: The Essential - Volume 2; The Very Best of Larry Norman Vol. 2; Live at the Elsinore; Wounded Lion; Sixty - The Trilogy Concert; The Colossus of Roads; Rebel Poet, Jukebox Balladeer: The Anthology
"Reap What You Sow"		4 Track Motorola '66 Corolla	2005	
"Rehearsing" (with Randy Stonehill)		The Colossus of Roads	2008	
"Riding High" (People!)	Norman; Gene Mason	Non-album single	1967	Down Under (But Not Out); We Wish You a Larry Christmas; The Very Best of Larry Norman Vol. 1; Emancipator: The Essential - Volume 5; The Best of People! Vol. 1; People! The Reunion Concert 2006
"Riding in the Saddle" (partly spoken)	Norman	Down Under (But Not Out) (Royal Music)	1986	
"Riff"	Norman	Rehearsal for Reality (re-release)	2005	
"Right Here in America"	Norman	Street Level	1970	A Moment in Time; American Roots
"Righteous Rocker" (a.k.a. "Without Love You Are Nothing", "Righteous Rocker, Holy Roller", "Righteous Rocker #1", "Righteous Rocker #3," "Without Love, You Ain't Nothing (Righteous Rocker)")	Norman	"Without Love" / "Peace, Pollution, Revolution" (single)	1971	Bootleg; Only Visiting This Planet; In Another Land; Larry Norman (Starstorm); Down Under (But Not Out) (Phydeaux cassette; Royal Music); White Blossoms from Black Roots; The Best of Larry Norman; The Rock Revival Vol. 3: Jesus People Music Festival; Where The Woodbine Twineth; The Cottage Tapes, Book One; Agitator: The Essential - Volume 2; Restless in Manhattan '72; The Very Best of Larry Norman Vol. 1; Infiltrator: The Essential - Volume 6; The Cottage Tapes - Book Two; Slinky; In Another Land: The Missing Pieces; Sixty - The Trilogy Concert; Rebel Poet, Jukebox Balladeer: The Anthology
"The River Is Deep"	Norman	The Norman Conquest	2005	
"The Road and the Sky"	Jackson Browne	Streams of White Light Into Darkened Corners (Phydeaux cassette)	1988	Invitation Only; Underground Manouevers
"The Road That Leads to Home"		Non-album single	2006	Sierra Romeo
"The Rock That Doesn't Roll"	Norman	In Another Land	1976	"The Rock That Doesn't Roll" / "Diamonds/One Way" (promo single); Power Music; New Generation of Rock; Roll Away the Stone (and Listen to the Rock); Live at Flevo (CD); Omega Europa; The Hits of Contemporary Christian Music '76 & '77; Sonrise; Shouting in the Storm; Live at the Mac; In the Beginning; Sticks & Stones; Rough Diamonds, Precious Jewels (The Belfast Bootlegs); Rock, Scissors et Papier; Live at Cornerstone; Road Rage; The Very Best of Larry Norman Vol. 2; On the Prowl; The Final Concert; 70 Miles from Lebanon; Frisbee; Underground Manouevers; The Norman Conquest; Slinky; In Another Land: The Missing Pieces; Wounded Lion; Monsters; Pot O' Gold; Sixty - The Trilogy Concert; You Are Not My People; Live at the Cavern Club
"Rock the Flock"	Norman	Gathered Moments (Somewhere in This Lifetime)	1998	Father Touch; Tourniquet; Collaborator: The Essential - Volume 4; Live at Cornerstone; The Very Best of Larry Norman Vol. 2; Solid Rock Army 2010 Disc 001
"Romanian Orphan"		Pot O' Gold	2007	
"Romans and Such"	Norman	The Final Concert	2004	
"Run Maggie Run"		Live at the Elsinore	2005	Archive
"Salt of the Earth"		4 Track Motorola '66 Corolla	2005	
"Sandy Beaches" (a.k.a. "Yellow Daisies")		Magnetic Real: The Living Room Tapes - Vol. 2 (1963)	2012	Magnetic Real: The Living Room Tapes - 1963
"Segue" (I) (short instrumental intermezzo) (with Beam)	Norman	Breathe In, Breathe Out	1998	
"Segue" (II) (short instrumental intermezzo) (with Beam)	Norman	Breathe In, Breathe Out	1998	
"Segue-Heterodynes" (short instrumental) (with Beam)	Norman	Breathe In, Breathe Out	1998	
"Selah"	Norman	Home at Last	1989	Footprints in the Sand; The Best of Larry Norman - Volume 2; Emancipator: The Essential - Volume 5
"Shake Your Rattle and Crawl"	Norman	Home at Last	1989	Sticks & Stones; Underground Manouevers; Shake Your Rattle and Crawl: Larry Norman Songs For Kids
"She Had Me by the Hair"		The Norman Invasion	2004	Live at the Cavern Club
"She's a Dancer" (a.k.a. "Dancer") (People!)	Norman	Both Sides of People	1969	Street Level (limited edition); So Long Ago the Garden; We Wish You a Larry Christmas; Infiltrator: The Essential - Volume 6; The Cottage Tapes - Book Two; 4 Track Motorola '66 Corolla; Siege at Elsinore; The Best of People! Vol. 1; The Best of People! Vol. 2; Sixty - The Trilogy Concert; People! The Reunion Concert 2006
"She's My Girl"		Magnetic Real: The Living Room Tapes - Vol. 4 (1963)	2013	Magnetic Real: The Living Room Tapes - 1963
"Shine a Light"	Mick Jagger; Keith Richards	Streams of White Light Into Darkened Corners	1977	
"Shine Your Light"	Tom Howard	Letter of the Law	1982	Quiet Night
"Shot Down"	Norman	In Another Land	1976	Roll Away the Stone (and Listen to the Rock); Down Under (But Not Out) (Royal Music); The Best of Larry Norman; The Rock Revival Vol. 1: Feeling the Spirit; Shouting in the Storm; Live at the Mac; The Vineyard; In the Beginning; Rough Diamonds, Precious Jewels (The Belfast Bootlegs); Solid Rock Sampler 1; Live at Cornerstone; Road Rage; The Very Best of Larry Norman Vol. 2; Emancipator: The Essential - Volume 5; Frisbee; Slinky; In Another Land: The Missing Pieces; Wounded Lion; You Are Not My People; Sixty - The Trilogy Concert; Live at the Cavern Club
"Shout" (part of medley "Everybody Work" / "Twist and Shout" / "Shout")	O'Kelly Isley, Jr. Rudolph Isley; Ronald Isley	Live at Flevo	1990	The Gospel Rock Collection; Rough Diamonds, Precious Jewels (The Belfast Bootlegs); The Very Best of Larry Norman Vol. 2; Pot O' Gold
"Show Me the Shepherd"	Tom Howard	Letter of the Law	1982	
"Sick of the World"		Conscription 2007	2007	Sierra Romeo
"The Sign on the Cross"		Dust on Rust	2006	
"Sigrid Jane" (a.k.a. "Rita Rita - Sigrid")	Norman	Street Level (limited edition)	1970	Quiet Night; Instigator: The Essential - Volume 1; The Very Best of Larry Norman Vol. 1; The Cottage Tapes - Book Two; 4 Track Motorola '66 Corolla
"A Sin to Dance"	Norman	70 Miles from Lebanon	2004	
"Sitting in My Kitchen"	Norman	Home at Last	1989	Footprints in the Sand; The Best of Larry Norman - Volume 2; The Very Best of Larry Norman Vol. 1; Liberator: The Essential - Volume 3; The Norman Invasion
"Six, Sixty, Six" (a.k.a. "666 (The Anti-Christ)," "Rosemary's Baby (The Omen - 666)")	Norman	Bootleg	1972	In Another Land; Come as a Child; Shouting in the Storm; The Vineyard; In the Beginning; Rough Diamonds, Precious Jewels (The Belfast Bootlegs); Agitator: The Essential - Volume 2; Road Rage; The Very Best of Larry Norman Vol. 2; Snowblind; The Final Concert; 70 Miles from Lebanon; The Cottage Tapes - Book Two; Heartland Junction; Live at the Elsinore; In Another Land: The Missing Pieces; How Then Shall We Live?; You Are Not My People; Sixty - The Trilogy Concert; Rebel Poet, Jukebox Balladeer: The Anthology; Live at the Cavern Club
"Six Feet of Chain"	Lee Hazlewood	Shepherd of Green Pastures	2013	The Salt of the Sea; Archive
"Slave Song Medley"		Underground Manouevers	2005	
"Sleep Walk"	Santo Farina; Johnny Farina; Ann Farina	Copper Wires	1998	
"Slow Fast"	Norman	Gathered Moments (Somewhere in This Lifetime)	1998	Rough Diamonds, Precious Jewels (The Belfast Bootlegs)
"Snowball" (Beam)	Beam	Breathe In, Breathe Out	1998	
"The Solid Rock"	Norman	A Moment in Time	1994	
"Somebody Tell Me My Name" (People!)	Geoff Levin; Dennis Fridkin	Non-album single	1968	Down Under (But Not Out); We Wish You a Larry Christmas; The Best of People! Vol. 1; People! The Reunion Concert 2006
"Somewhere Out There"	Norman	Home at Last	1989	Footprints in the Sand; The Best of Larry Norman - Volume 2; Infiltrator: The Essential - Volume 6
"Song for a Small Circle of Friends"	Norman	Bootleg	1972	In Another Land; Roll Away the Stone (and Listen to the Rock); Songs for a Small Circle of Friends; Children of Sorrow; Totally Unplugged (cassette); Omega Europa; Live at the Mac; Where The Woodbine Twineth; The Cottage Tapes, Book One; Blarney Stone; Rough Diamonds, Precious Jewels (The Belfast Bootlegs); Agitator: The Essential - Volume 2; Live at Cornerstone; Restless in Manhattan '72; On the Prowl; The Very Best of Larry Norman Vol. 2; The Final Concert; 70 Miles from Lebanon; The Cottage Tapes - Book Two; Heartland Junction; Live at the Elsinore; Underground Manouevers; Face to Face; Snapshots from the '77 World Tour; In Another Land: The Missing Pieces; Wounded Lion; How Then Shall We Live?
"Song for Adam"	Jackson Browne	Streams of White Light Into Darkened Corners	1977	
"Song for My Parents" (with Randy Stonehill)		Ten Times Two: Tour Of the Americas	2005	
"A Song Won't Stop the World"	Norman	Bootleg	1972	The Norman Invasion
"Sonshine" (with Steve (Camp) Stonebrook)		The Colossus of Roads	2008	
"Soon I Will Be Home" (sung by Elisabeth Ødegard) (part of medley "Soon I Will Be Home" / "It's Only Today That Counts" / "I Am a Servant")	Elisabeth Ødegard	Live at Flevo (CD)	1990	
"Soul" (Downtown Dub)	Norman	The Best of the Second Trilogy	1988	
"Soul on Fire"	Norman	Roll Away the Stone (and Listen to the Rock)	1980	The Story of the Tune; Back to America; Down Under (But Not Out); The Best of the Second Trilogy; White Blossoms from Black Roots; The Best of Larry Norman; Live at the Mac; Blarney Stone; The Best of Larry Norman - Volume 2; Rock, Scissors et Papier; The Very Best of Larry Norman Vol. 1; Liberator: The Essential - Volume 3; The Norman Invasion; Snapshots from the '77 World Tour
"Soul Survivor"	Norman	So Long Ago the Garden	1973	Instigator: The Essential - Volume 1; Maximum Garden: The Anthology Series; Siege at Elsinore; Sixty - The Trilogy Concert
"Spirit in the Sky"	Norman Greenbaum	Streams of White Light Into Darkened Corners	1977	Ten Times Two: Tour Of the Americas
"The Staff That I Lean On"	Kristy Norman	Shepherd of Green Pastures	2013	Sierra Romeo
"Stairway L'etudes" (instrumental)	Norman	Labor of Love	1982	
"Standing at the Crossroads"	Norman	Gathered Moments (Somewhere in This Lifetime)	1998	Invitation Only; Underground Manouevers
"Standing in the Spot Light" (with Randy Stonehill)		Ten Times Two: Tour Of the Americas	2005	
"Step into the Madness"	Norman	Stranded in Babylon	1991	Totally Unplugged; Collaborator: The Essential - Volume 4
"Stop This Flight"	Norman	Stop This Flight	1985	"Stop This Flight" / "Everybody Work" (12-inch single); Back to America; Down Under (But Not Out); The Best of Larry Norman; Gathered Moments (Somewhere in This Lifetime); Survivor: The Essential - Volume 7; On the Prowl; Heartland Junction; Underground Manouevers; Face to Face; Monsters
"Stranger" (a.k.a. "Stranger Won't You Change") (with The Young Lions)	Norman	Gathered Moments (Somewhere in This Lifetime)	1998	Infiltrator: The Essential - Volume 6; Underground Manouevers; Safecracking
"Stranger in a Strange Land"	Leon Russell	Streams of White Light Into Darkened Corners	1977	
"Strong Hand (Just One Miracle)"		Non-album single	2005	The Salt of the Sea
"Strong Love"	Tom Howard	Letter of the Law	1982	"Strong Love" (single); Quiet Night; The Vineyard
"Strong Love, Strange Peace"	Norman	Come as a Child	1983	In Another Land (CD); Rough Diamonds, Precious Jewels (The Belfast Bootlegs); Instigator: The Essential - Volume 1; Restless in Manhattan '72; The Very Best of Larry Norman Vol. 2; Snowblind; In Another Land: The Missing Pieces
"Stuck in America"	Norman	Rehearsal for Reality (re-release)	2005	
"Studio Coughing Talking"		Dust on Rust	2006	
"Stuft"	Norman	Rehearsal for Reality (re-release)	2005	
"Summer's Almost Gone"		Magnetic Real: The Living Room Tapes - Vol. 3 (1963)	2013	Magnetic Real: The Living Room Tapes - 1963
"The Sun Began to Rain"	Norman	In Another Land	1976	White Blossoms from Black Roots; The Best of Larry Norman - Volume 2; Emancipator: The Essential - Volume 5; In Another Land: The Missing Pieces; Sixty - The Trilogy Concert; Rebel Poet, Jukebox Balladeer: The Anthology
"Surfer Girl" (with Randy Stonehill)		Ten Times Two: Tour Of the Americas	2005	
"Surfing on Stone Waves"		Archive	2018	
"Sweet Dreams" (Q-Stone & Larry Norman)	Mikko Kuustonen; Norman	Q-Stone (Q-Stone album)	1989	Royal at Its Best; The Best of Larry Norman; Barking at the Oops! Rough Mix 3
"Sweet Silver Angels" (a.k.a. "Jesus Was a Cross Maker")	Judee Sill	Agitator: The Essential - Volume 2	2002	The Hum of the Diesels
"Sweet Sweet Song of Salvation" (a.k.a. "Sweet Song of Salvation")	Norman	Upon This Rock	1969	"Sweet Sweet Song of Salvation" / "Walking Backwards Down the Stairs" (single); Bootleg; Jesus Sound Explosion; The Son Worshipers; The Key Collection; The Israel Tapes; Down Under (But Not Out); The Rock Revival Vol. 1: Feeling the Spirit; Children of Sorrow; Sonrise; Shouting in the Storm; The Best of Larry Norman - Volume 2; Rough Diamonds, Precious Jewels (The Belfast Bootlegs); Agitator: The Essential - Volume 2; Solid Rock Sampler 1; The Very Best of Larry Norman Vol. 1; Road Rage; Heartland Junction; Frisbee; Slinky; You Are Not My People; Live at the Cavern Club; Shake Your Rattle and Crawl: Larry Norman Songs For Kids
"Swing Low, Sweet Chariot"	Wallace Willis	The Story of the Tune	1983	Flevo Totaal Festival - Live Tapes Volume 1; Rough Diamonds, Precious Jewels (The Belfast Bootlegs); American Roots; Heartland Junction; Snapshots from the '77 World Tour
"Take It or Leave It" (with Randy Stonehill)	Norman	Solid Rock Sampler 1	2003	Ten Times Two: Tour Of the Americas
"Taking My Time"	Norman	Bootleg	1972	The Rock Revival Vol. 3: Jesus People Music Festival; Where The Woodbine Twineth; The Cottage Tapes, Book One; The Best of Larry Norman - Volume 1; Agitator: The Essential - Volume 2; The Cottage Tapes - Book Two
"Talking..."		Sixty - The Trilogy Concert	2007	
"Talking About Love"	Norman	Gathered Moments (Somewhere in This Lifetime)	1998	Infiltrator: The Essential - Volume 6
"Talking 'Bout Stuff"		Heartland Junction	2004	
"Telephone"		4 Track Motorola '66 Corolla	2005	
"The Thanksgiving Song"		Dust on Rust	2006	
"That's What Love Is For"	Norman	Sticks & Stones	2000	Underground Manouevers
"That's When Jesus Knew (Epitaph b.3996 B.C. -d. 2004 A.D.)"	Norman	The Best of the Second Trilogy	1988	Breathe In, Breathe Out; Survivor: The Essential - Volume 7; Covert Field Report
"These Days" (with Randy Stonehill)		Ten Times Two: Tour Of the Americas	2005	
"Think" (People!)	Lowman Pauling	Both Sides of People	1969	Down Under (But Not Out) (Phydeaux cassette); The Best of People! Vol. 2
"This Land Is Your Land"	Woody Guthrie	Solid Rock Army 2010 Disc 001	2010	The Salt of the Sea
"'Til Kingdom Come" (Coldplay cover)	Guy Berryman, Jonny Buckland, Will Champion, Chris Martin	"Strong Hand" / "Til Kingdom Come" (single)	2005	The Salt of the Sea; Archive
"Time in Babylon"		Sessions	2004	The Hum of the Diesels
"Tom Howard's Fish Song"	Norman	Snapshots from the '77 World Tour	2005	
"Too Loud in Your Earphones"		Conscription 2007	2007	
"Top 40 Survey"	Norman	In Another Land (cassette re-release)	1998	In Another Land: The Missing Pieces; Sixty - The Trilogy Concert
"Toxic Tea and Toast" (instrumental)	Norman; Herb Manuputy	A Moment in Time	1994	
"Trinity"	Norman	Down Under (But Not Out) (Royal Music)	1986	The Best of the Second Trilogy; Sticks & Stones
"Trouble Is a Lonesome Town"	Lee Hazlewood	Trouble Is a Lonesome Town	2013	Archive
"The Troubles"	Norman	Blarney Stone	2000	Tourniquet (bonus track); Rough Diamonds, Precious Jewels (The Belfast Bootlegs); Rock, Scissors et Papier; Emancipator: The Essential - Volume 5
"The Tune"	Norman	Barking at the Ants	1981	"The Tune (Almost)" (EP); The Story of the Tune; Barking at the Oops! Rough Mix 3; The Best of Larry Norman - Volume 1; Rough Diamonds, Precious Jewels (The Belfast Bootlegs); Survivor: The Essential - Volume 7; Snowblind; Live at the Cavern Club
"Tuning Up" (unlisted, short instrumental)	Norman	In Another Land (CD release)	1993	In Another Land: The Missing Pieces
"Turn"	Charles Norman	Tourniquet	2001	Collaborator: The Essential - Volume 4; Solid Rock Sampler 1
"Turn! Turn! Turn!"	Pete Seeger	Copper Wires	1998	American Roots; Covert Field Report; The Salt of the Sea
"Twelve Good Men"	Norman	Live at Flevo	1990	Something New Under the Son (CD release); Footprints in the Sand; Omega Europa; The Vineyard; The Best of Larry Norman - Volume 2; Rough Diamonds, Precious Jewels (The Belfast Bootlegs); Road Rage; Maximum Son: The Anthology Series; Pot O' Gold; You Are Not My People; People! The Reunion Concert 2006; Digital (Dutch) Masters
"Twilight L'etudes" (instrumental)	Norman	Labor of Love	1982	
"Twist and Shout" (part of medley "Everybody Work" / "Twist and Shout" / "Shout")	Bert Berns; Phil Medley	Live at Flevo	1990	The Gospel Rock Collection; Gathered Moments (Somewhere in This Lifetime); Rough Diamonds, Precious Jewels (The Belfast Bootlegs); Road Rage; The Very Best of Larry Norman Vol. 2; The Norman Invasion; Pot O' Gold; Live at the Cavern Club
"Two Roads"	Norman	On the Prowl	2004	
"UFO"	Norman	Bootleg	1972	In Another Land; "UFO" / "I Am a Servant" (single); Wir singen für Gott - 20 christliche Songs; Come as a Child; Live at Flevo; Children of Sorrow; Totally Unplugged (cassette); Omega Europa; Live at the Mac; The Vineyard; In the Beginning; Rough Diamonds, Precious Jewels (The Belfast Bootlegs); Agitator: The Essential - Volume 2; Solid Rock Sampler 1; Restless in Manhattan '72; The Very Best of Larry Norman Vol. 1; Road Rage; The Final Concert; 70 Miles from Lebanon; Live at the Elsinore; Ten Times Two: Tour Of the Americas; In Another Land: The Missing Pieces; Wounded Lion; How Then Shall We Live?; Sixty - The Trilogy Concert; Rebel Poet, Jukebox Balladeer: The Anthology; Live at the Cavern Club
"Ugly Brown"	Lee Hazlewood	Trouble Is a Lonesome Town	2013	
"Unborn Child"	Norman	Rock, Scissors et Papier	2003	
"Uncredited, Unidentified Song"	Norman	Maximum Planet: The Anthology Series	2004	
"Under His Love"	Norman	Rough Diamonds, Precious Jewels (The Belfast Bootlegs)	2001	
"Under the Eye"	Norman	Stranded in Babylon	1991	Sonrise; Emancipator: The Essential - Volume 5
"Up in Canada"	Norman	So Long Ago the Garden (Phydeaux re-release)	1980	Where The Woodbine Twineth; The Cottage Tapes, Book One; The Best of Larry Norman - Volume 1; Instigator: The Essential - Volume 1; Restless in Manhattan '72; Maximum Garden: The Anthology Series; Frisbee; Slinky; How Then Shall We Live?
"Uptown to Burbank" (Randy Stonehill Studio Improvisation)		The Colossus of Roads	2008	
"Veja Du" (instrumental)	Norman	Father Touch	1999	
"Visions of Johanna"		Dust on Rust	2006	
"Voices in the Night" (a.k.a. "Voices")	Norman	Rehearsal for Reality	1986	
"The Wabbit and the Twain"	Norman	Underground Manouevers	2005	Shake Your Rattle and Crawl: Larry Norman Songs For Kids
"Wake Up to Me" (a.k.a. "Wake Up to Me Gentle")		4 Track Motorola '66 Corolla	2005	
"Walking Backwards Down the Stairs" (a.k.a. "Walking Backwards")	Norman	Upon This Rock	1969	"Sweet Sweet Song of Salvation" / "Walking Backwards Down the Stairs" (single); Bootleg; Children of Sorrow; The Best of Larry Norman - Volume 1; Rough Diamonds, Precious Jewels (The Belfast Bootlegs); Instigator: The Essential - Volume 1; The Very Best of Larry Norman Vol. 1; The Norman Invasion; Slinky
"Watch What You're Doing"	Norman	Roll Away the Stone (and Listen to the Rock)	1980	Something New Under the Son; Down Under (But Not Out) (Royal Music); White Blossoms from Black Roots; Totally Unplugged; Gathered Moments (Somewhere in This Lifetime); Copper Wires; Live at the Mac; The Vineyard; Blarney Stone; Sticks & Stones; The Best of Larry Norman - Volume 1; Rough Diamonds, Precious Jewels (The Belfast Bootlegs); Survivor: The Essential - Volume 7; On the Prowl; The Very Best of Larry Norman Vol. 2; Emancipator: The Essential - Volume 5; Heartland Junction; Hattem; Snapshots from the '77 World Tour; Monsters; Maximum Son: The Anthology Series; Pot O' Gold; Rebel Poet, Jukebox Balladeer: The Anthology
"Watching the Eclipse"	Norman	Rehearsal for Reality (re-release)	2005	Face to Face
"Waves of Grace"	David Noble	March for Jesus '95	1995	Invitation Only; Infiltrator: The Essential - Volume 6; Safecracking
"We Need A Whole Lot More Jesus (And A Lot Less Rock 'N' Roll)" (People!)	Wayne Raney	I Love You	1968	Down Under (But Not Out) (Phydeaux cassette); We Wish You a Larry Christmas; I Love You Korea; The Best of People! Vol. 2; People! The Reunion Concert 2006
"We Three Twogether"	Norman	The Best of the Second Trilogy	1988	Home at Last; The Best of Larry Norman - Volume 2; American Roots; Underground Manouevers; Covert Field Report; Shake Your Rattle and Crawl: Larry Norman Songs For Kids
"We Were All So Young" (with Randy Stonehill, Phil Keaggy, Russ Taff, Barry McGuire, Noel Paul Stookey, Anne Herring, Love Song)		Edge of the World (Randy Stonehill album)	2002	
"Wedding Gifts"		Motorola Corolla 2	2007	
"Weight of the World"	Norman	Totally Unplugged	1994	Rough Diamonds, Precious Jewels (The Belfast Bootlegs); The Norman Conquest
"What Goes Through Your Mind" (a.k.a. "Thru Your Mind")	Norman	Bootleg	1972	Down Under (But Not Out); Where The Woodbine Twineth; The Cottage Tapes, Book One; The Best of Larry Norman - Volume 1; Agitator: The Essential - Volume 2; Conscription 2007; The Cottage Tapes - Book Two
"What You Gonna Do About That" (with Randy Stonehill)		Ten Times Two: Tour Of the Americas	2005	
"What's Wrong with This Body"	Norman	Stop This Flight	1985	Gathered Moments (Somewhere in This Lifetime); Survivor: The Essential - Volume 7; Rock, Scissors et Papier; On the Prowl; Monsters; Rough Mix Audio Pack
"What Was Wrong"	Norman	The Final Concert	2004	
"When All My Dreams Are Ending" (a.k.a. "All My Dreams")	Norman	Father Touch	1999	Liberator: The Essential - Volume 3; 4 Track Motorola '66 Corolla
"When He Returns"	Bob Dylan	Copper Wires	1998	American Roots
"When I First Met You" (a.k.a. "When I First Saw You")	Norman	Bootleg	1972	The Best of Larry Norman - Volume 1; Frisbee; Slinky; Live at the Cavern Club
"When Messiah Comes" (instrumental)	Norman	Down Under (But Not Out)	1986	
"When the Son Comes Back" (a.k.a. "Darkness All Around")	Norman	A Moment in Time	1994	Liberator: The Essential - Volume 3
"When You Sent Your Son" (with Beam)	Norman	Breathe In, Breathe Out	1998	
"Whenever Sarah Cries"	Tom Howard	Letter of the Law	1982	
"Where His Soul Touches Down"	Tom Howard	Labor of Love	1982	
"Where Is Love" (with Randy Stonehill)		Ten Times Two: Tour Of the Americas	2005	
"Where Is Pretty Little Susie"		Live at the Elsinore	2005	
"White Trash Stomp" (a.k.a. "Texas and Me")	Norman	Stranded in Babylon	1991	Totally Unplugged; Emancipator: The Essential - Volume 5
"Why Can't You Be Good"	Norman	Larry Norman and His Friends on Tour	1981	Barking at the Ants; Come as a Child; Down Under (But Not Out); Rehearsal for Reality; Barking at the Oops! Rough Mix 3; Blarney Stone; Survivor: The Essential - Volume 7; Underground Manouevers; The Colossus of Roads; Archive
"Why Don't You Look Into Jesus" (a.k.a. "Jim Ware's Blues", "Look Into Jesus") (Larry Norman & White Light)	Norman	Street Level (underground edition)	1971	Bootleg; Only Visiting This Planet; In Another Land; Jubilation, Too!; Roll Away the Stone (and Listen to the Rock); Jesus Christus: Hoffnung für die 80er Jahre; White Blossoms from Black Roots; Live at Flevo (CD); Children of Sorrow; Omega Europa; Breathe In, Breathe Out; Copper Wires; Live at the Mac; Where The Woodbine Twineth; The Cottage Tapes, Book One; In the Beginning; Rough Diamonds, Precious Jewels (The Belfast Bootlegs); Agitator: The Essential - Volume 2; Live at Cornerstone; History Makers: The Best of Christian Rock Vol. 1 1970 - 1986; Restless in Manhattan '72; The Very Best of Larry Norman Vol. 1; Road Rage; Snowblind; The Final Concert; 70 Miles from Lebanon; The Cottage Tapes - Book Two; Heartland Junction; Maximum Planet: The Anthology Series; Frisbee; Underground Manouevers; Face to Face; Slinky; In Another Land: The Missing Pieces; How Then Shall We Live?; Pot O' Gold; You Are Not My People; People! The Reunion Concert 2006
"Why Me Lord"		"The Six O'Clock News" (CD single)	2004	The Salt of the Sea
"Why Should the Devil Have All the Good Music"	Norman	Only Visiting This Planet	1972	Roll Away the Stone (and Listen to the Rock); Down Under (But Not Out); White Blossoms from Black Roots; Live at Flevo; Barking at the Oops! Rough Mix 3 (with Geoff Moore); Totally Unplugged; Copper Wires; Live at the Mac; The Vineyard; WOW Gold; Rough Diamonds, Precious Jewels (The Belfast Bootlegs); Agitator: The Essential - Volume 2; Live at Cornerstone; Restless in Manhattan '72; The Very Best of Larry Norman Vol. 1; Road Rage; On the Prowl; Heartland Junction; Maximum Planet: The Anthology Series; Frisbee; Face to Face; Snapshots from the '77 World Tour; Slinky; Wounded Lion; Monsters; How Then Shall We Live?; Pot O' Gold; You Are Not My People; Rebel Poet, Jukebox Balladeer: The Anthology; Live at the Cavern Club
"With a Ribbon"		4 Track Motorola '66 Corolla	2005	
"Without Him"	Norman	Rough Diamonds, Precious Jewels (The Belfast Bootlegs)	2001	
"Without You"	Ted Sandquist	Gathered Moments (Somewhere in This Lifetime)	1998	
"A Woman Not a Maid" (a.k.a. "Keeper for My Heart")	Norman	Gathered Moments (Somewhere in This Lifetime)	1998	Rough Street Love Letter; Survivor: The Essential - Volume 7; Infiltrator: The Essential - Volume 6
"A Woman of God (Proverbs 31)" (a.k.a. "More Precious Than Jewels")	Norman	Stop This Flight	1985	Back to America; Down Under (But Not Out) (Royal Music); Rehearsal for Reality; The Best of the Second Trilogy; White Blossoms from Black Roots; The Best of Larry Norman; Children of Sorrow; Totally Unplugged; Copper Wires; The Best of Larry Norman - Volume 2; Rough Diamonds, Precious Jewels (The Belfast Bootlegs); On the Prowl; Infiltrator: The Essential - Volume 6; Heartland Junction; Face to Face; Monsters; Safecracking; Live at the Cavern Club
"World Full of Love"		Magnetic Real: The Living Room Tapes - Vol. 2 (1963)	2012	Magnetic Real: The Living Room Tapes - 1963
"Wouldn't It Be Loverly"		The Norman Invasion	2004	Live at the Cavern Club
"Yesterday"		The Norman Invasion	2004	Live at the Cavern Club
"You Can Save Me"	Norman	Bootleg	1972	White Blossoms from Black Roots (cassette); The Norman Invasion
"You Can't Take Away the Lord"	Norman	Upon This Rock	1969	Jesus the Rock; We Wish You a Larry Christmas; Agitator: The Essential - Volume 2
"You Did It for Me"	Norman	Sticks & Stones	2000	
"You Got the Blues" (a.k.a. "Jimi Haze," "Woke Up")	Norman	Gathered Moments (Somewhere in This Lifetime)	1998	Blarney Stone
"You Gotta Have Jesus"		Non-album single	2003	The Colossus of Roads; The Salt of the Sea
"You Gotta Move"	Mississippi Fred McDowell; Rev. Gary Davis	Shepherd of Green Pastures	2013	The Salt of the Sea
"You Shall Be Saved" (a.k.a. "One Foot Toward the Grave")	Norman	A Moment in Time	1994	Omega Europa; Liberator: The Essential - Volume 3; Underground Manouevers; Digital (Dutch) Masters
"You'll Never Find No One"		"Lost Unto This World" (single)	2007	Maximum Land
"You'll Never Guess" (instrumental)	Norman	Father Touch	1999	
"You'll Never Know for Sure" (People!)		Both Sides of People	1969	
"Your Name in Lights"		Motorola Corolla 2	2007	
"Zimmy Finds His Father" (instrumental)	Norman	Rehearsal for Reality	1986	
