= Lonely Boy =

Lonely Boy may refer to:

== Music ==
- "Lonely Boy" (Paul Anka song), 1959
- "Lonely Boy" (Andrew Gold song), 1977
- "Lonely Boy" (The Black Keys song), 2011
- "Lonely Boy", a 1963 song by Larry Norman on the album Home at Last
- "Lonely Boy", a 1979 song by the Sex Pistols on the album The Great Rock 'n' Roll Swindle

== Other uses ==
- Lonely Boy (film), a National Film Board of Canada documentary about Paul Anka
- Lonely Boy (2013 film), an American comedy-drama with Mackenzie Astin
- Lonely Boy, a name given to Dan Humphrey in the Gossip Girl television and novel series
