= So Long Ago the Garden =

Studio album by Larry Norman
- Released: 1973
- Recorded: 1973
- Genre: Christian rock
- Label: MGM
- Producer: Rod Edwards, Roger Hand, Jon Miller

Larry Norman chronology
Only Visiting This Planet (1972)	So Long Ago the Garden (1973)	In Another Land (1976)

So Long Ago the Garden is an album recorded by Larry Norman, released in 1973. It is the second album in what came to be known as his "trilogy," which began with the album Only Visiting This Planet and concluded with In Another Land. So Long Ago the Garden was controversial because Norman's previously obvious Christian beliefs were more veiled on this album. In the song "Shot Down", on the album In Another Land, Norman responded to accusations by fellow Christians that he had abandoned his faith in search of fame and fortune.

Professional ratings
Review scores
Source	Rating
AllMusic	4/5 stars
Jesus Freak Hideout	3/5 stars

== History ==
Norman began recording the album on August 7, 1973 at AIR studios in London. It was produced by a British triumvirate of Rod Edwards, Roger Hand and Jon Miller. According to John J. Thompson, lyrically "the album reflects on the nature of the human condition. The songs deal with characters...knee deep in the madness of life without God". In a 1980 interview, Norman said:

It is my favourite album, and one of the most banned and misunderstood albums that I've recorded. Christians don't seem to be as aware of, or as sensitive to, the dire state of humanity as they are about the pleasant growth of their Christian walk. So Long Ago The Garden was as definitive a statement as I could make about the emptiness of our lives without Christ, just how lonely and wretched we truly are.

Recording was completed by October 1, 1973 and submitted to MGM. However, financial problems at MGM, which would result in its collapse within fifteen months, meant the album received limited promotion. According to Norman, it dropped several Christian songs, including "Butterfly," "If God Is My Father," "Kulderachna", and "I Hope I'll See You In Heaven", in favor of love songs like "Fly, Fly, Fly" and "Christmastime", both previously released as singles.

Norman reissued the album in 1980 with a modified track list, retitled Almost...So Long Ago the Garden and the MGM Singles. As part of a Compleat Trilogy series, in 2008 Solid Rock released a version of the album that restored two of the withheld songs. Each of the four affected songs has been released on other albums: "If God Is My Father" on Larry Norman (1977) "Kulderachna" and "Butterfly" on Instigator - The Essential, Volume 1 (2003) and "I Hope I'll See You In Heaven" on Down Under (But Not Out) (1986).

The release of So Long Ago the Garden in November 1973 caused controversy in the Christian press primarily due to its album cover: some believed it featured a naked Norman, and that this was proof he had fallen away from God. John J. Thompson considered that the cover, which featured a photo of a lion superimposed on Norman's skin, referred to an Old Testament prophecy about the Messiah as "the lion of the tribe of Judah" and Adam in the Garden of Eden. Steve Turner noted that the songs examined fall of man and were "mostly written from the perspective of the scarred"; but that some Bible bookstores nonetheless refused to sell his albums and his concerts were canceled until Noel Paul Stookey invited him onstage during a concert eighteen months later.

Believing that MGM was interfering with the subject matter of his records, by 1974 Norman had left the label. Not long after this decision, MGM Records folded due to economic difficulties.

A version of the song "Christmas Time" originally appeared on the rare album Born Twice, by Norman's friend Randy Stonehill, which Norman had produced in 1969. On that LP, the songwriting is credited to Stonehill, but the original release of So Long Ago the Garden credits Norman and Stonehill as co-authors. The later Phydeaux re-release only credits Norman.

"Lonely By Myself" was recorded using the same mellotron used by the Beatles on "Strawberry Fields Forever" while Paul McCartney was in the next room recording "Live and Let Die."

The song "Nightmare #71" mentions silent film star Elmo Lincoln. Lincoln has a star on the Hollywood Walk of Fame at 7042 Hollywood Boulevard, next door to Norman's Solid Rock Records office at 7046 Hollywood Boulevard.

== Tracks ==
All songs by Larry Norman.

Original LP release

Side 1

1. "Meet Me at the Airport (Fly, Fly, Fly)"
2. "It's the Same Old Story"
3. "Lonely By Myself"
4. "Be Careful What You Sign"
5. "Baroquen Spirits"

Side 2

1. "Christmas Time" (original release credits Normal and Randy Stonehill as writers; Norman's re-releases only credit Norman)
2. "She's a Dancer"
3. "Soul Survivor"
4. "Nightmare" (from original release; later releases called this song "Nightmare #71)

1980 Phydeaux reissued as Almost...So Long Ago the Garden and the MGM Singles

Side 1

1. "Christmastime" (rerecorded version)
2. "Fly, Fly, Fly"
3. "She's a Dancer"
4. "It's the Same Old Story" (with rerecorded vocal)
5. "Baroquen Spirits"

Side 2

1. "Up In Canada"
2. "Be Careful What You Sign"
3. "Lonely By Myself"
4. "Peacepollutionrevolution"
5. "Nightmare" (with rerecorded vocal and slightly early fade)

CD reissues

The CDs released by Norman's companies in the 1990s and 2000s restored the original MGM vocals to "Christmastime", "Same Old Story", and "Nightmare". They also featured a severely edited version of "Baroquen Spirits". Different releases had different bonus tracks.

1. "Fly, Fly, Fly"
2. "It's the Same Old Story"
3. "Lonely By Myself"
4. "Be Careful What You Sign"
5. "Baroquen Spirits"
6. "Christmas Time"
7. "She's a Dancer"
8. "Soul Survivor"
9. "Nightmare #71"

Bonus tracks differ on various CD releases

1. "Up in Canada" (1973 single)
2. "Butterfly"
3. "I Hope I'll See You in Heaven"
4. "If God Is My Father" (rough mix)
5. "Dear Malcolm, Dear Alwyn" (demo)
6. "Soul Survivor" (alternate take with Randy Stonehill)

== "89 Words" ==
In the lyrics of the surrealistic song "Nightmare," a character (specifically, a "marionette of Harpo Marx") supposedly says "exactly 89 words" to the narrator, who says "count 'em" before proceeding to quote them. In the original version of the song, however, the actual number of words is 94. The version from Almost...So Long Ago the Garden and the MGM Singles adds a further 5 words ("we sleep till he arrives"), bringing the count up to 99. Norman makes reference to this near the end of the song "Leaving The Past Behind," from Something New Under the Son, by singing "89 is really 99."

== Personnel ==
- Larry Norman – vocals, keyboards
- Bob Brady – piano
- Tony Carr – percussion
- Malcolm Duncan – saxophone
- Roger Ball – saxophone
- Rod Edwards – piano, clavinet, wurlitzer, Mini Moog, Hammond Synth
- Michael Giles – drums
- Roger Hand – percussion
- Hollywood Street Choir – vocals
- Graham Smith – harmonica
- Randy Stonehill – guitar, background vocals
- Mickey Keene – guitar
- Dave Markee – bass
- Dave Wintour – bass
- Graham Preskett – violin

Production notes

- Gareth Edwards – assistant engineer
- George Martin – recording
- Bill Price – engineer
- Tony Scotti – mix down
- Tommy Vicari – mastering

== See also ==
- Larry Norman discography
