= Tourniquet (album) =

Studio album by Larry Norman
- Released: 2001
- Label: Solid Rock Records
- Producer: Larry Norman, Charles Norman

Tourniquet is an album recorded by Larry Norman and released in 2001.

== History ==
The creative collaboration with his brother Charles Norman bore fruit on his 2001 album Tourniquet, an album of all new songs, which was produced by the Albino Brothers (Larry and Charles Norman). Of the nine songs "Turn" was written by Charly Norman, with two others being co-written by him with Larry, and Charly's band, then called Softcore, providing the musical backing. Intended to be a pre-release to Behind the Curtain, the as yet unreleased first album in Norman's Second Trilogy, first mentioned in 1983, Tourniquet was described by Dougie Adam as "perhaps Larry's deepest, most articulate album ever ... [and] even more hard hitting than 'Only Visiting This Planet' or 'Stranded in Babylon'". In his latter years whenever Norman made rare live performances, it would often be accompanied by his brother's band, Softcore (later renamed Guards of Metropolis).

== Tracks ==
1. "Turn"
2. "Endless Life Of Dreams"
3. "Center Of My Heart"
4. "Rock The Flock"
5. "It's All Right"
6. "Love is The Reason"
7. "Feed The Poor"
8. "Father Of All"
9. "Near"

=== Bonus tracks (1st CD-R) ===
1. "Lugoj"
2. "The Troubles"
3. "Dark Passage"
4. "I Need A Touch"

=== Bonus Songs (2nd CD-R) ===
1. "I Need A Touch"
2. "Lugoj"
3. "The Troubles"

== Personnel ==
- Larry Norman - vocals, harmonies, guitar, and piano
- Charles Norman - harmonies, guitar, piano, bass and drums

== See also ==
- Larry Norman discography
