= Home at Last =

Home at Last may refer to:

== Music ==
- Home at Last (Billy Ray Cyrus album), 2007
- Home at Last (Glen Campbell album), 1997
- Home at Last (Larry Norman album), 1989
- "Home at Last", song by Steely Dan from Aja, 1977
- "Home at Last", song by Trevor Jones from the 1986 Labyrinth soundtrack
- "Home at Last", song by Dash Berlin and Sir Notch, 2021
- "Home at Last", song by HOMESHAKE, 2014

== Other ==
- Home At Last (horse), a thoroughbred horse that won the 1990 Super Derby
- Home at Last, a story from The Railway Series book "The Little Old Engine"
