= In Another Land (album) =

Studio album by Larry Norman
- Released: 1976
- Recorded: 1975
- Studios: Mama Jo's, Hollywood
- Genre: Christian rock
- Label: Solid Rock
- Producer: Larry Norman

Larry Norman chronology
So Long Ago the Garden (1973)	In Another Land (1976)	Streams of White Light (1977)

Professional ratings
Review scores
Source	Rating
AllMusic	3/5 stars

In Another Land is a studio album recorded by Larry Norman and released in 1976. It is the third album in Norman's "trilogy", which began with Only Visiting This Planet and continued with So Long Ago the Garden. The album contains some of Norman's most well-known work.

== History ==
In 1975 Norman recorded In Another Land, the third album in his trilogy, which was released in 1976 through his own Solid Rock label and distributed through Word Records, making it "the first of his albums to be released on a Christian label". However, according to Norman, "In Another Land, was executorially censored by the "mother company" which insisted on removing any music they felt was "too negative" or "too controversial." Commercial pressure from Norman's "American publisher and American and European distributors" forced Norman to remove four songs from In Another Land: "I Dreamed that I Died", "Looking for the Footprints", "Top 40 Survey", and "You'll Never Find No One (Who Loves You Like I Do", as they believed that Norman had included too many songs, and that the deleted songs could be released on his next album. One of the songs included on this album was "The Sun Began to Rain" (The Son Began to Reign), an allegory written by Norman, was "knocked out ... in just over a minute" with British comedian Dudley Moore on piano. In a 1980 interview Norman explained the purpose of In Another Land:

In Another Land is the third part of the trilogy It's about the future, and rather than speculate about what the future might hold, I tried to stick closely to what the Bible says it will hold. I think because the future orientated album was so directly tied to the scriptures, people felt this is Larry's best album, because this is the one I like best. Or This is the most Christian album. I think that Only Visiting This Planet or So Long Ago The Garden were much better conceptional statements, much better medicine for a non-Christian to swallow. The front cover of In Another Land posed a problem. I couldn't really go and stand on a hillside in front of The New Jerusalem, so I just put together a lot of photographs of Israel and photographs of mountainous terrain. The front cover shows a painting of me standing on a hill, for the first time smiling at the camera, because in the new age I won't be troubled as I have always been on my other albums about things like world hunger, and world ignorance, human anger and jealousy and pettiness.

Norman provides a more detailed analysis of In Another Land in the producer notes of the 1991 re-issue. In Another Land was Norman's best-selling album ever, and had the best reception of any of his albums from the Christian establishment. In 2005 Norman recalled:

The Church finally accepted me in 1976, I think it was, and that's just because I had so many songs people knew that the records stores said, "Okay, I'll take a chance." I did In Another Land, which was such a mellow album. It's really for Christians (none of the other albums were), but what do you say when the concept of the album is eternal life with God in heaven? … Of course they liked that album and the record stores sold it and it was Album of the Month for Word Record Club and it was the #1 seller for a long time.

By 1985 In Another Land had sold 120,000 copies in the USA alone, compared with average sales of less than ten thousand for other gospel albums, Responding to the better acceptance of In Another Land by many church leaders who had previously opposed him and his music, Norman indicated in 1980: "I realised that the music itself would probably appeal to the middle of the road Christians who are offended by the extremes in my observations. But if they like this album, and if they suddenly decide that I have returned to the fold and I am now one of them, they're going to hate the next album - it's all blues." Norman held several concerts in Australia in October 1976.

A different version of the song "I Love You" was first recorded by Randy Stonehill on the now-rare album Born Twice, which was produced by Larry Norman back in 1969. That album credits Stonehill as the writer of the song. Norman's version completely changes all the verses, retaining only the first line of the first verse of Stonehill's original composition.

"Righteous Rocker #3" is a reprise of a song which originally appeared on Only Visiting This Planet.

The album also contains a souped-up version of "Why Don't You Look Into Jesus," another song which made its first appearance on Only Visiting This Planet. In the later version the controversial second verse from the original ("Gonorrhea on Valentine's Day / You're still looking for the perfect lay," etc.) is conspicuously absent.

"I Am a Servant" was recorded and popularized as a Christian pop ballad by Christian singer Honeytree. The song "Song for a Small Circle of Friends" includes allusions to Randy Stonehill, Eric Clapton, Bob Dylan, Charlie Watts of the Rolling Stones, and Paul McCartney.

== Track listing ==
=== Original LP release ===
==== Side 1 ====
1. "The Rock That Doesn't Roll"
2. "I Love You" (Larry Norman, Randy Stonehill)
3. "UFO"
4. "I've Searched All Around"
5. "Righteous Rocker #3"
6. "Deja Vu (If God Is My Father / Why Don't You Look Into Jesus)"
7. "I Am a Servant"

==== Side 2 ====
1. "The Sun Began to Rain"
2. "Shot Down"
3. "Six, Sixty, Six"
4. "Diamonds"
5. "One Way"
6. "Song for a Small Circle of Friends"
7. "Hymn to the Last Generation"

=== "The Missing Pieces" reissue ===
"This is the running order on the original master tape which was sent to Word U.K."

1. "Tuning"
2. "The Rock That Doesn't Roll"
3. "UFO"
4. "I've Searched All Around"
5. "Shot Down"
6. "Song for a Small Circle of Friends"
7. "The Sun Began to Rain"
8. "Looking for the Footprints"
9. "Six Sixty Six"
10. "Righteous Rocker #3"
11. "If God Is My Father"
12. "Why Don't You Look Into Jesus"
13. "Diamonds"
14. "One Way"
15. "I Am a Servant"
16. "Hymn to the Last Generation"

=== Extra tracks on CD releases ===
1. "Looking for the Footprints"
2. "Dreams On a Grey Afternoon"
3. "Six Sixty Six" (alternate take)
4. "Strong Love, Strange Peace"
5. "Dear Malcolm, Dear Alwyn"
6. "Joyful Delta Day"
7. "I Don't Believe In Miracles"

== Covers ==
Frank Black, a longtime admirer of Norman who became a friend, covered "Six, Sixty, Six" on his album Frank Black and the Catholics.

== Credits ==
- Larry Norman – vocals, harmonies, guitar, percussion, piano, producer,
- Randy Stonehill – guitar and backing vocals
- Jon Linn – guitars
- Dudley Moore – piano
- Mark Walker – drums
- Tim Ayres – bass guitar
- John Michael Talbot – banjo
- Andy Johns – engineer
- Tom Trefethen – assistant engineer
- Solid Rock studios – pre-production recording location
- Mama Jo's – recording location
- Sunset Sound – recording location
- A&M, Studio 3 – mastering location
