= Charles Normal =

American record producer

Charles Edward Norman (born March 8, 1965), known by the stage name Charles Normal, is an American record producer, audio engineer, songwriter and multi-instrumentalist. He is perhaps best known for his work with Frank Black, Pete Yorn, Jetboy, and his brother, musician Larry Norman. He has collaborated with Guns N' Roses, Steve Jones, Isaac Brock, Courtney Taylor-Taylor, and actor Kiefer Sutherland.

== Early life ==
Norman was born in San Jose, California, and was exposed to the performing arts at a young age, coming from a family of musical and theatrical performers. His grandfather was a vaudeville actor, his aunt a burlesque circuit pianist, and his brother Larry Norman had a national Top 20 Hit record with the San Jose-based rock band People! when Normal was three years old.

In 1982, at the age of 17, Normal became the lead guitarist of the influential Bay Area hardcore punk rock band Executioner. By the age of 20, he had grown disillusioned with the San Jose and San Francisco punk scenes and moved to Hollywood, California, at the behest of his older brother Larry, who offered Normal the role of bassist in his band for a series of national and international tours starting in 1985.

== Career ==
=== 1988–1995 ===
After a lengthy residence in the Netherlands and Sweden working as a record producer, Normal moved back to America in 1989 and joined MCA recording artists Jetboy, replacing Sam Yaffa (Hanoi Rocks, New York Dolls) as bass player. He spent the following year touring the U.S. and Canada with the band in support of their album Damned Nation. It was during this time period that he forged a strong relationship with Guns N' Roses keyboardist Dizzy Reed, eventually moving in with Reed and Sinisstar drummer/record producer Sid Riggs.

In 1991, Normal returned to Scandinavia, spending seven months in Norway producing and co-writing Larry Norman's album, Stranded in Babylon. His band The Merchants of Venus signed a record deal with Warner Music in 1994 and Normal produced and engineered their album Wish Across The Land, which was nominated for the Spellemannprisen in the Rock category the following year.

=== 1996–2005 ===
1996, brought Normal back to the U.S. when Dizzy Reed asked him to sit in for Guns N' Roses bassist Duff McKagan who was touring with another group. Normal took part in the recording sessions for what would eventually become the Chinese Democracy album, but after several months of rehearsing with the rapidly dissolving line-up of Guns N' Roses, he moved back to Norway to form a band of his own.

The Guards of Metropolis (née Softcore) was the result, a Norwegian pop rock group that spent the next few years touring Europe and America. In 2003, the band signed to actor Kiefer Sutherland's recently formed indie label Ironworks Music and began to record their first album. Creative differences between Normal and Ironworks producer Jude Cole led to the band's departure from the label and the recording of their self-produced album, Alligator. While Normal was finishing the album he, co-wrote, produced, and engineered Mark Lemhouse's album, The Great American Yard Sale, which won the 2005 Muddy Award for Best National Recording.

=== 2007–2013 ===
Normal began working with Pixies singer Frank Black (a.k.a. Black Francis) in 2007 as a touring and session guitarist. He has appeared on two albums by Black's side-project Grand Duchy, and played guitar on Pete Yorn's self-titled 2010 album which was produced by Black.

In 2012, Normal signed with Los Angeles based independent label SideOneDummy Records with his latest incarnation, the self-described "audioarcheological" solo project Thriftstore Masterpiece. For its debut album, a cover of Lee Hazlewood's 1963 album Trouble Is a Lonesome Town, Normal enlisted members of Modest Mouse, The Dandy Warhols, Pixies, Art Brut, and The Guards of Metropolis. The album had a July 2013 release.

== Personal life ==
In 1997, Normal married Norwegian singer/artist Kristin Blix. They live in Salem, Oregon, with their son, where Normal owns and operates Magnetic Real recording studio.

== Select discography ==
- Hellbound – Executioner
- Anthology – Executioner
- Stranded in Babylon – Larry Norman
- Wish Across the Land – The Merchants of Venus
- Hi-Fi Demonstration Record – Wondergroove
- Alligator – Guards of Metropolis
- Tourniquet – Larry Norman
- Let the People Speak – Grand Duchy
- Pete Yorn – Pete Yorn
- Seven Fingers – Black Francis
- Petits Fours – Grand Duchy
- Presents Lee Hazlewood's Trouble Is a Lonesome Town – Thriftstore Masterpiece
