= Malcolm and Alwyn =

British gospel beat music group in the 1970s

- Genres: Gospel beat, rock
- Years active: 1969–1976, 1981
- Labels: Myrrh, A&S
- Past members: Malcolm Wild; Alwyn Wall

Malcolm and Alwyn were a popular British gospel beat music group in the 1970s. They played rock music influenced by Simon and Garfunkel, Bob Dylan and The Beatles with lyrics reflecting their conversion to Christianity. The duo was composed of Malcolm Wild and Alwyn Wall, who had been performing together in a band called The Zodiacs prior to their conversion. Malcolm and Alwyn recorded two albums in the early '70s before they disbanded in 1976, and a live reunion album in 1981 before again parting ways. The live album was recorded on 24 January 1981 at Calvary Chapel, Costa Mesa, California, U.S. Both Malcolm and Alwyn released solo albums following the group's disbanding. Alwyn Wall featured on Larry Norman's 1981 live Friends on Tour album.

== Career ==
Their 1973 debut album Fool's Wisdom sported a stellar cast of session musicians including John Wetton of King Crimson on bass, Rod Edwards and Roger Hand of Edwards Hand on keyboards and percussion, veteran drummer Clem Cattini, and guitarist Mickey Keen of Hudson Ford. Edwards Hand and Mickey Keen also appeared on Malcolm and Alwyn's follow-up album, Wildwall.

Wild is currently senior pastor of Calvary Chapel in Merritt Island, Florida, and still performs with the Calvary Chapel Worship Band as well as operating a record label, Footstep Records. He also ministers via radio with the program "Sound Truth". Wall is currently senior pastor at Calvary Chapel in Westminster, London, England.

== Discography ==
=== Albums ===
- Fool's Wisdom (Pye NSPL-18404, 1973, review)
- Wildwall (Key Records KL 022, 1974, review)
- Malcolm and Alwyn – Live! (MRC MRC 007, 1981, review)

=== Solo ===
- The Alwyn Wall Band (solo), The Prize (Myrrh MSB-6596, 1977)
- Malcolm Wild (solo), Broken Chains (Grapevine GRV-131, 1979)
- Malcolm [Wild] and the Mirrors (solo), Red Alert (A&S Records AS0004, 1982)
- Alwyn Wall (solo), Invisible Warfare (Chapel Lane, CLS-8009, 1981)

=== Songs on compilations ===
- Love, Joy, Peace, "Fool's Wisdom" (Various Artists, Myrrh MYR-6540, 1974)
- Jubilation!, "Tomorrow's News" (Various Artists, Myrrh MST-6555, 1975)
- Jubilation, Too, "I Love" (Various Artists, Myrrh MST-6568, 1976)
