= Edwards Hand =

- Also known as: Picadilly Line
- Origin: England
- Genres: Folk rock, psychedelic pop, psychedelic rock, psychedelia
- Years active: 1968–1970s
- Past members: Rod Edwards; Roger Hand

Edwards Hand (formerly known as Picadilly Line) was a musical group formed by Welshman Rod Edwards (keyboards and vocals) and Englishman Roger Hand (acoustic guitar and vocals). After a 1968 album released under their former name, in 1969 Edwards Hand released an eponymous album produced by George Martin who, taking a break from working on The Beatles' White Album, described their music as "exceptional". The online CD vendors Freak Emporium (UK) and Forced Exposure (US) tentatively compare it to certain works by Kaleidoscope and Fairfield Parlour.

A further album, Stranded, came in 1970. Also produced by Martin, for this they were backed by James Litherland on electric guitar, former Tornados drummer Clem Cattini and John Wetton – who was later to find fame with King Crimson and Asia – playing bass. Forced Exposure and Freak Emporium describe Stranded as...

...a superb blend of styles that is very hard to categorise. Short West Coast influenced rock tracks sit alongside all out progressive anglophile pop symphonies that at times utilise the kind of 'everything including the kitchen sink' tactics employed by Brian Wilson.

Their final album, Rainshine, was again produced by Martin in 1971 but, rejected by the band's RCA Victor label. For this album, the line-up included the Americans Les Brown Jr. on drums and percussion and David Dowd on guitar, as well as Harry Reynolds on bass.

In 1975 Edwards and Hand set to music the poems of a best selling 1973 children's picture book, illustrated by Alan Aldridge (famous for his work with the Beatles), called The Butterfly Ball and the Grasshopper's Feast which was loosely based on a poem called "Butterfly's Ball, and the Grasshopper's Feast" written in 1802 by William Roscoe. This album featured the voices of Judi Dench and Michael Hordern. It was originally released on the Argo label and has been re-released by wizardpresents. It features Edwards on keyboards and vocals and Hand on guitar and vocals, with Gerry Conway on drums and Bruce Lynch on bass.

== Albums ==
=== The Huge World of Emily Small (1968) ===
An album released under the band name Picadilly Line, the featured musicians were Edwards and Hand plus Danny Thompson (bass), Alan Hawkshaw (keyboards), Herbie Flowers (bass) and Harold McNair (flute). All material is original except for a version of Bob Dylan's "Visions of Johanna" and The Everly Brothers' "Gone, Gone, Gone"

=== Edwards Hand (1969) ===
Recorded in stereo at the EMI Abbey Road studio in St John's Wood, London, Produced by George Martin, the album was released in the United States on vinyl and cassette by GRT Records of Sunset Boulevard, Los Angeles, California. The cover art is a golden autumnal scene featuring two faces, those of Rod Edwards and Roger Hand, with a tree in the background. All songs were written by Edwards and Hand except If I thought You'd Ever Change Your Mind by John Cameron.

- Banjo Pier
- Characters Number One
- Close My Eyes
- Days of Our Life
- Episodes, Being The First Part
- Friday Hill
- House of Cards
- If I thought You'd Ever Change Your Mind (by John Cameron)
- Magic Car
- Orange Peel
- Sing Along with the Singer

=== Stranded (1970) ===
Recorded at London's Morgan Studios Produced by George Martin, assisted by John Miller and released on RCA Victor, the original cover art, as seen on the UK release, was a black and white drawing of a sheriff's rotund stomach produced by Klaus Voormann (famous for designing the cover of The Beatles' album Revolver). The drawing referred to a track about one of America's racist policemen, Sheriff Myras Lincoln, which was banned in the USA. A new cover was produced for the US release, this time a photograph of a hand, fingers splayed, beneath the Stars and Stripes. All songs were written by Edwards and Hand.

- Death of a Man (an epic in five parts)
- Encounter
- Hello America
- Revolution's Death Man!
- Sheriff Myras Lincoln
- Stranded
- US Flag
- Winter

=== Rainshine (1971) ===
Produced by George Martin in 1971 at AIR studios in London; mixed by John Miller. Unreleased at the time it will be available on Cherry Red Records with bonus tracks, in 2010. All songs written by Edwards and Hand.

== Notable appearances ==
- Piano and backing vocals on the Larry Norman classic Only Visiting This Planet (Verve, 1972);
- Keyboards and percussion on Larry Norman's So Long Ago the Garden (MGM, 1973);
- Keyboards and percussion on the Malcolm and Alwyn album Fool's Wisdom (Myrrh, 1973);
- Keyboards and percussion on Malcolm and Alwyn's Wildwall (Myrrh, 1974).
- Keyboards and vocals on Ashman Reynolds
