= Upon This Rock (Larry Norman album) =

Studio album by Larry Norman
- Released: 1969
- Genre: Christian rock; Religious
- Length: 43:01
- Label: Capitol
- Producer: Hal Yoergler

Larry Norman chronology
Upon This Rock (1969)	Street Level (1970)

Upon This Rock is the debut solo album by Christian rock musician Larry Norman, released in 1969. Produced by Hal Yoergler, Upon This Rock was called the first full-blown Christian rock album.

== Background ==
In 1969, Norman was signed by Mike Curb at Capitol Records. In response to his claim that young people no longer were interested in singing songs about God to which they could not relate, Norman released his first solo rock album, Upon This Rock, in December 1969. Called the "Sergeant Pepper of Christianity", the album is a blend of folk, psychedelic, and rock.

== Release and reception ==
Professional ratings
Review scores
Source	Rating
Allmusic	4/5 stars

After releasing Upon This Rock, Capitol Records had no idea how to market it since its content was outside of the standards of the Gospel music genre. Although Norman's concerts were sold out, the album was not selling, so Capitol Records subleased the album to a smaller label. In February 1970, telling Norman there was no audience for his music, Capitol dropped Norman from its label.

Norman negotiated a deal with Benson Records and Upon This Rock received increased sales due to its distribution in Christian bookstores.

== Tracks ==
=== Original LP release ===
Upon This Rock (Capitol 1969) Produced by Hal Yoergler

==== Side 1 ====
1. "Prelude" (Note: This track is omitted from later releases.)
2. "You Can't Take Away the Lord"
3. "I Don't Believe in Miracles"
4. "Moses in the Wilderness"
5. "Walking Backwards Down the Stairs"
6. "Ha Ha World"

==== Side 2 ====
1. "Sweet Sweet Song of Salvation"
2. "Forget Your Hexagram"
3. "The Last Supper"
4. "I Wish We'd All Been Ready"
5. "Nothing Really Changes"
6. "Postlude"

=== Extra tracks on some CD releases ===
1. "You Can't Take Away the Lord" (demo)
2. "Ha Ha World" (demo)
3. "Sweet Sweet Song of Salvation" (live)
4. "Nothing Really Changes" (demo)

== Personnel ==
- Anthony Harris – orchestration
- Hal Blaine – drums
- Hal Yoergler - executive producer
- Joe Osborn – bass
- Kerry Hopkins – lyricist
- Larry Knechtel – keyboards
- Larry Norman – composer, vocals, guitar, piano
- Mike Deasy – acoustic guitar
- The Inspirations – backing vocals

== See also ==
- Larry Norman discography
