= Bootleg (Larry Norman album) =

Compilation album by Larry Norman
- Released: 1972
- Recorded: 1968–1972
- Genre: Rock
- Label: One Way Records

Larry Norman chronology
Street Level (1970)	Bootleg (1972)	Only Visiting This Planet (1972)

Professional ratings
Review scores
Source	Rating
Allmusic	3/5 stars

Bootleg is an album created by Larry Norman, released in 1972. It was originally released as a double-LP.

== History ==
In early 1972, One Way Records released Bootleg, a double album retrospective covering the previous four years of Norman's career compiled from demonstration recordings made while at Capitol, private recordings from his friends, and various interviews and live performances. Among the speeches included is "Let the Lions Come", which Norman addressed to Russia for Christ Ministries, which was founded by David V. Benson in 1958. It was deliberately recorded to sound like an unauthorized bootleg recording to ensure reception by street people. In 1999 Norman explained the unpolished nature of Bootleg: "Many songs which ended up being released on Bootleg, ... weren't really finished but I had to release the album immediately so it wouldn't violate the terms of my MGM contract which was soon going to be in effect. ... I just didn't have time to finish it. ... I didn't have the budget to make it a real album, I just used songs laying around to fill it up, which I regretted".

== Tracks ==
=== Original LP release ===
==== Side 1 (1968: The early tapes) ====
1. "I Think I Love You"
2. "Walking Backwards"
3. "Ha Ha World"
4. "Classical Mandolin"
5. " I Don't Believe in Miracles"
6. "The Day That a Child Appeared"

==== Side 2 (1969: The One Way sessions) ====
1. "What Goes Through Your Mind"
2. "No Change Can Attend"
3. "One Way"
4. "A Song Won't Stop the World"
5. "Blue Shoes White"
6. "666 (The Anti-Christ)"
7. "Taking My Time"
8. "I've Searched All Around"

==== Side 3 (1970 -1971: Mixed media) ====
1. "Television Interview"
2. "Let the Lions Come (Speech to Russia for Christ)"
3. "Jesus and the Movies"
4. "Addressing the National Youth Workers Convention"

==== Side 4 (1971 -1972: Maranatha) ====
1. "When I First Met You"
2. "Without Love You Are Nothing"
3. "A Love Like Yours"
4. "You Can Save Me"
5. "Even if You Don’t Believe"
6. "UFO"
7. "Why Don't You Look Into Jesus"
8. "Song for a Small Circle of Friends"

== Personnel ==
- Larry Norman – guitar, keyboards, vocals
- Glenn Selwitz - bass
- Fred Bova - guitar
- Hilly Michaels - drums
