= Street Level =

Live album studio album by Larry Norman
- Released: 1970
- Recorded: 1970
- Genre: Rock
- Label: One Way
- Producer: Larry Norman

Larry Norman chronology
Upon This Rock (1969)	Street Level (1970)	Bootleg (1971)

Street Level is a live album recorded by Larry Norman in 1970. The second LP version, released in 1971 and 1972 under the same name, has a different B-side. The 2001 CD issue combines the tracks from both versions. The 2005 CD re-issue has the same selection of tracks as the original 1970 LP release. The album was one of two released by Norman while between contracts with Capitol Records (1969) and MGM Records (1971).

== Tracks ==
=== Original LP release ===
==== Side 1 (Live concert in Hollywood) ====
1. "Poem" (2005 title: "The First Time That I Went To Church")
2. "Peace, Pollution, Revolution" (2005 title: "Peacepollutionrevolution")
3. "Right Here In America"
4. "I Wish We'd All Been Ready"

==== Side 2 (Rough studio recordings) ====
1. "I Am The Six O'clock News"
2. "She's A Dancer"
3. "I Don't Wanna Lose You"
4. "The Price Of Living"
5. "Sigrid Jane"

=== Second LP release ===
==== Side 1 (Live concert in Hollywood) ====
1. "First Day in Church"
2. "Peace Pollution Revolution"
3. "Right Here in America"
4. "I Wish We'd All Been Ready"

==== Side 2 (Larry Norman and White Light) ====
1. "Baby Out Of Wedlock"
2. "One Way"
3. "Blue Shoes White"
4. "I've Searched All Around the World"
5. "No More LSD for Me"
6. "Jim Ware's Blues"
