= Stranded in Babylon =

Studio album by Larry Norman
- Released: 1991
- Genre: Christian rock
- Label: Solid Rock Records
- Producer: Charles Norman

Professional ratings
Review scores
Source	Rating
Allmusic	3/5 stars

Stranded in Babylon is an album recorded by Larry Norman in Norway in 1991. It was re-released in 1993 as Stranded in Babylon: The American Re-Mix. The album comprises 13 new songs written by Larry and represents some of his best work since the early days of his career. Larry and his brother Charly play all of the instruments, but the sound is full and well-produced.

== History ==
The creative rush that followed Norman's healing was expressed on Stranded In Babylon which saw him collaborate with his younger brother Charles "Charly" Norman. After four months in the recording studio in Sweden, and overdubbing in Norway by the Albino Brothers (Norman and his brother, Charly), in 1991 Norman released through Spark Music the European version of Stranded in Babylon, an album which was recorded in Sweden in 1988. Hailed by both critics and fans as one of his best albums, it was praised as "a superb new album which sees a return to the form he showed to full effect on those classics like 'Only Visiting This Planet' and 'So Long Ago The Garden' back in the mid seventies" with 13 new "songs [that] are cleverly arranged and produced, with plenty of pertinent lyrical imagery and the sly wit of yore amongst the electric guitar solos and breezy (sampled?) saxophones" by Norman and his brother, Charly, who share all of the musical duties. Stranded in Babylon was named Album of the Year by Christian rock journals. Stranded in Babylon was conceived as the second album in a projected Second Trilogy that was planned to include (in order) a still unreleased Behind the Curtain, and the previously released Home at Last. Included on this album is "God Part III", which draws on John Lennon's "God" and the U2 riposte ("God II"); "Come Away", written about his 1973 meeting on the streets of Shepherd's Bush with prostitute Holly Valentine, who later became a Christian; and the autobiographical "Under The Eye", "which tells how Larry has, despite the last decade, always been watched and cared for". "Under the Eye" references "all the trouble and strife/And the things which went wrong and lasted so long", and "The mystery of love, the push and the shove/ Of friendship betrayed, of plans I mislaid,/ The oceans I crossed, the things that I lost/ And the world in my hand as dreams turned to sand", including his 1978 plane accident and his subsequent brain damage: "I crashed in a plane, I really damaged my brain/ And then I layed in my bed with all this music in my head./ The years have rolled by, I've watched the past die/ But feelings remained like mercy much strained./ Like a seed left unsown, like a leaf that was blown/Like a man who was blind, there was a lock on my mind", but also his 1991 healing: "Then a man came to me and he held out the key/ And the lock hinge was blown, I had never been alone". Norman's February 1992 heart attack delayed the release of the US version of this album until 1994.

== Tracks ==
1. "Oh Lydia"
2. "God Part 3"
3. "Come Away"
4. "Hide His Heart"
5. "Step Into The Madness"
6. "Love Is A Commitment"
7. "I Will Survive"
8. "All The Way Home"
9. "Baby's Got The Blues"
10. "A Dangerous Place To Be"

=== Bonus tracks ===
1. "White Trash Stomp"
2. "Let The Rain Fall Down"
3. "Under The Eye"

These bonus tracks appear on The American Re-Mix and the 2004 CD re-issue

== Personnel ==
- Larry Norman - vocals, harmonies, guitar, and piano
- Charles Norman - harmonies, guitar, piano, bass and drums

== See also ==
- Larry Norman discography
