= Something New Under the Son =

Something New under the Son

Studio album by Larry Norman
- Released: 1981
- Recorded: 1977
- Genre: Christian rock
- Length: 38 minutes
- Label: Solid Rock Records
- Producer: Larry Norman

Larry Norman chronology
Roll Away The Stone (And Listen To The Rock) (1978)	Something New under the Son (1981)	The Story Of The Tune (1983)

Something New Under The Son is an album recorded by Larry Norman in 1977 and released in 1981.

== History ==
In 1977 Norman recorded Something New under the Son, a blues-rock concept album that some regard as his tour de force, and as "one of the roughest, bluesiest, and best rock and roll albums of his career or the whole industry", that took its title from "an ironic inversion of a phrase in Ecclesiastes", namely: "there is nothing new under the sun" (Ecclesiastes 1:9b). Norman indicated that the songs chronicled "Pilgrim's" journey into faith. On this album Norman deliberately "took lots of musical & lyrical parts from old blues songs and from Bob Dylan songs". The album cover replicates Bob Dylan's Bringing It All Back Home's cover on the inner sleeve of the original LP. Jesus Music historian David Di Sabatino described the album as "Musically reminiscent of The Rolling Stones' Exile on Main Street"(1972). "Nightmare #97" imitates the "false start" of Bob Dylan's 115th Dream and uses the opening line and a similar tune of Lloyd Price's version of Stagger Lee. "Watch What You're Doing" uses the opening line of Stump Johnson's "The Duck Yas-Yas-Yas". With the song "Let That Tape Keep Rolling" Norman pays homage to Mick Jagger and Van Morrison. Norman explained the philosophy behind this album:

The album is called Something New Under the Son. Well my music is not new. "There's nothing new under the sun", Solomon said and my album is not new. I'm not trying to say that my album is new under the sun but I'm trying to say that we are something new under the Son. When we're born again we're a new creature and old things pass away, so on my album I wanted to put some remnants from the past. There are little bits and pieces in the music that some people might recognise have been on other albums before. Just a word there, a little sentence or some musical riff or lick and a lot of people have figured out what they are and when you listen to it you say "wait a minute, I think I've heard that before!" Yes, you have, because there's nothing new under the sun - except us. We are new in Christ.

Norman had intended to release this as a double album with his 1971 song "The Tune" on the second album (and a blank fourth side or a side with a lengthy version of "Watch What You're Doing"). However, Word rejected Norman's wishes as they believed two separate albums would be more profitable, censored some of the songs, and delayed the album's release until 1981. A full length (almost 12 minute) version of "The Tune" was recorded in Hollywood in 1977, but not released until 1983 on the album The Story of the Tune, which is called "the continuation of Something New Under The Son on the back cover".

The CD reissue restores a censored verse to "Watch What You're Doing" and omits a brief intro from "Leaving The Past Behind."

== Tracks ==
=== Original LP release ===
==== Side 1 ====
1. "Hard Luck Bad News"
2. "Feeling So Bad"
3. "I Feel Like Dying"
4. "Born To Be Unlucky"
5. "Watch What You're Doing"

==== Side 2 ====
1. "Leaving The Past Behind"
2. "Put Your Life Into His Hands"
3. "Larry Norman's 97th Nightmare"
4. "Let That Tape Keep Rolling"

=== Bonus tracks ===
1. "Twelve Good Men"
2. "It's Only Today That Counts"
3. "Watch What You're Doing" (8:36 version - previously unreleased)

These bonus tracks appear on the 2003 CD re-issue

== Personnel ==
- Larry Norman - vocals, guitars, percussion, piano, harmonica, saxophone
- Jon Linn - guitars and flaming fingers
- Alex MacDougall - drums
- Peter Johnson - drums
- Dave Coy - bass
- Billy Batstone - bass
- Tim Jaquette - bass
- Randy Stonehill and Tom Howard - loose strings and lost paperwork

== See also ==
- Larry Norman discography
