= Only Visiting This Planet =

Studio album by Larry Norman
- Released: 1972
- Studios: AIR Studios, London
- Genre: Christian rock
- Length: 39:09
- Label: Verve
- Producers: Rod Edwards, Roger Hand, Jon Miller

Larry Norman chronology
Bootleg (1972)	Only Visiting This Planet (1972)	So Long Ago the Garden (1973)

Professional ratings
Review scores
Source	Rating
AllMusic	5/5 stars

Only Visiting This Planet is a Christian rock album recorded by Larry Norman in 1972. The album was selected as the second-best album in CCM Magazine's The 100 Greatest Albums in Christian Music. In April 2014 the album was announced as one of 25 sound recordings inducted for 2013 into the Library of Congress National Recording Registry, that preserves as "cultural, artistic and/or historical treasures, representing the richness and diversity of the American soundscape", making it the first Christian rock album chosen for the registry.

== History ==
On September 8, 1972 Norman began recording his second studio album, Only Visiting This Planet, the first album in a projected trilogy, in AIR Studios in London. Only Visiting This Planet, often ranked as Norman's best album, "mixed his Christian message with strong political themes", and "was meant to reach the flower children disillusioned by the government and the church" with its "abrasive, urban reality of the gospel". In a 1980 interview, Norman explained its purpose:

Only Visiting This Planet is the first part of the trilogy, and represents the present. On the front cover, I find myself standing in the middle of New York City, with buildings and traffic pressed around me and my hand on my head kind of saying, What is going on in this life? Is this really earth?, and the back cover is me visiting the site of a previous civilisation with its own monoliths, not skyscrapers, but amazing, architecturally sound structures just the same. The Druids apparently constructed Stonehenge to help them observe or worship the sun, and their civilisation is now as dead as will someday be New York. And I'm just standing there, looking around, wondering what happened to kill off this culture and reduce its entire recorded history to a few standing structures.

On January 6, 1973 Norman was one of three named as Best New Male Artist of the year by Cashbox. By February 1973 songs from Only Visiting This Planet had been recommended by Billboard for "heavy Top 40 airplay", and were being played on WVVS-FM, KSHE-FM, and WKTK-FM. In 1990 CCM Magazine voted it "the greatest Christian album ever recorded". Only Visiting This Planet was one of 25 sound recordings inducted for 2013 into the Library of Congress National Recording Registry, that preserves as "cultural, artistic and/or historical treasures, representing the richness and diversity of the American soundscape." A statement by the Library of Congress called the album "the key work in the early history of Christian rock," describing Norman as one who "commented on the world as he saw it from his position as a passionate, idiosyncratic outsider to mainstream churches."

After a tour of South Africa in June and the UK in July, and the release in July of his "Why Should the Devil Have All the Good Music?", a songbook featuring some of Norman's songs from both Upon This Rock and Only Visiting This Planet.

In the song "Reader's Digest" Norman sings the following verse: "Dear John, who's more popular now? I've been listening to Paul's records. I think he really is dead." (See Paul is dead) "Who's more popular now?" makes reference to John Lennon's famous claim that the Beatles were more popular than Jesus. The album features future King Crimson bassist and Asia frontman John Wetton on bass guitar, then a member of the progressive rock band Family.

A three-LP box set containing the entire trilogy in their originally intended forms and titled The Compleat Trilogy (as mentioned on the insert of the Street Level reissue of Only Visiting This Planet) has never been released. Solid Rock Records has created multiple reissues.

== Tracks ==
All tracks composed by Larry Norman

Original LP release This is the order on the original Verve album. On the Street Level vinyl re-issue in 1977, Norman claimed that he always wanted the album to open with "I've Got to Learn to Live Without You" and subsequent re-releases had it first and "Why Don't you Look into Jesus" third.

Side 1

1. "Why Don't You Look into Jesus" – 4:03
2. "The Outlaw" – 3:52
3. "I've Got to Learn to Live Without You" – 3:35
4. "Righteous Rocker #1" – 3:32
5. "I Wish We'd All Been Ready" – 4:31

Side 2

1. "I Am Six O'Clock News" – 6:04
2. "The Great American Novel" – 4:30
3. "Pardon Me" – 3:36
4. "Why Should the Devil Have All the Good Music" – 2:37
5. "Reader's Digest" – 2:43
6. "Oh, How I Love You" – 0:42 (brief song snippet – not listed on label or album sleeve)

Additional tracks on some subsequent releases

1. "PeacePollutionRevolution" (1971 single)
2. "Righteous Rocker" (rough mix) or (Hard Rock Version) or (Delta Swamp Version)
3. "The Outlaw" (demo) or (Rock Remake) or (Peace Mix Remake)
4. "Digest" (rock version) or "Reader's Digest" (Hard Rock Remake) or (Solid Rock Studio Remake)

Maximum Planet (The Anthology Series)

1. "I've Got to Learn to Live Without You" – basic master track
2. "Why Don't You Look into Jesus" – master track
3. "I Wish We'd All Been Ready" – basic master track
4. "I Am the Six O'Clock News" – basic master track
5. "Six O'Clock News" – jet fade-in with stewardess
6. "Six O'Clock News" – jet fade-out jam
7. "The Great American Novel" – demo No. 2 with faint vox
8. "Pardon Me" – with vox & no orchestra
9. "Why Should the Devil Have All The Good Music" – vox 2.0
10. "Uncredited, Unidentified Song" – spiral out-groove
11. "The Great American Novel" – warm-up demo
12. "I've Got to Learn to Live Without You" – basic track
13. "The Outlaw" – with electric guitars and guide vocal
14. "I Am The Six O'Clock News" – basic track with guitars and guide vocal
15. "I Wish We'd All Been Ready" – with orchestra & no vox
16. "Why Should the Devil" – with guide vocal
17. "Why Don't You Look into Jesus" – on stage

== Personnel ==
- Larry Norman – vocals, piano
- John Wetton – bass
- Keith Smart – drums
- Mickey Keen – guitar
- Rod Edwards – piano and backing vocals
- Roger Hand – backing vocals
- Gordon Giltrap – guitar
- Bob Brady – piano
- Bill Price – engineer

== See also ==
- Larry Norman discography
