= Home at Last (Larry Norman album) =

Studio album by Larry Norman
- Released: 1989
- Genre: Rock
- Label: Phydeaux
- Producer: Larry Norman

Professional ratings
Review scores
Source	Rating
AllMusic	1/5 stars
Cross Rhythms	8/10 squares 6/10 squares

Home at Last is an album of mostly new material by Larry Norman first issued in 1989. It was originally released as a two-LP album and included some live tracks. It was reissued in 1998 as one album together with the 1994 compilation Footprints in the Sand. The 2007 re-release of Home at Last contained only the studio recordings of the original issue. It was released to mixed reviews, some citing disorganization and uneven production, and controversy. A music video of live performances of the 14 studio songs on Home at Last garnered a favourable review.

== Track listing ==
Original double-LP release

Side 1

1. "Lonely Boy"
2. "My Feet Are on the Rock"
3. "Country Church, Country People"
4. "Sitting In My Kitchen"

Side 2

1. "Camel Through a Needle's Eye"
2. "Nightmare #49 (Part 1)"
3. "Oh, How I Love You"
4. "Queen of the Rodeo"
5. "He Really Loves You"
6. "Here Comes the King"

Side 3

1. "Letters to the Church"
2. "We Three Twogether"
3. "Somewhere Out There"
4. "Selah"
5. "Nightmare #49 (Instrumental Mix)"

Side 4 (live)

1. "Letters to the Church"
2. "Camel Through a Needle's Eye"
3. "Surprise With Candles"
4. "Here Comes the King"
5. "Shake Your Rattle and Crawl"

2007 CD re-issue (Solid Rock Records)

1. "Lonely Boy"
2. "My Feet Are on the Rock"
3. "Country Church"
4. "Sitting In My Kitchen"
5. "Camel Through a Needle's Eye"
6. "Nightmare #49 (Part One)"
7. "Oh How I Love You"
8. "Queen of the Rodeo"
9. "He Really Loves You"
10. "Here Comes the King"
11. "Letters to the Church"
12. "We Three Twogether"
13. "Somewhere Out There"
14. "Selah"

== Personnel ==
- Larry Norman – vocals, harmonies, keyboards, acoustic piano, guitars, saxophone, harmonica
- Charles Norman – vocals, keyboards, synthesizers, lead guitar, rhythm guitars, slide guitar, bass, drums, percussion, harmonica
- Sarah Norman – vocals, harmonies, percussion

Additional musicians

- John Campbell – keyboards (6, 9)
- Dan Cutrona – keyboards (11)
- Steve Goomas – acoustic piano (13)
- Bob Somma – lead guitar (6), rhythm guitar (9, 13)
- Jon Linn – lead guitar (9)
- Jellybean Jaquette – bass (3, 6, 9, 11, 13)
- Dave Spurr – drums (6, 9, 11, 13)

== Production ==
- Larry Norman – producer, arrangements, mixing
- Jellybean Jaquette – engineer, mixing
- Charles Norman – mixing
- Mark Heard – mixing
- Jeff Frickman – mix assistant (1-10, 12, 13, 14)
- Brian Levi – mix assistant (1-10, 12, 13, 14)
- Jon Linn – mix assistant (11)

== See also ==
- Larry Norman discography
