= Celebrate This Heartbeat =

Studio album by Randy Stonehill
- Released: 1984
- Studio: Fingerprint Recorders (Montrose, California)
- Genre: Christian rock
- Length: 40:13
- Label: Myrrh
- Producer: Barry Miller Kaye

Randy Stonehill chronology
| Equator (1983) | Celebrate This Heartbeat (1984) | Love Beyond Reason (1985) |

Professional ratings
Review scores
| Source | Rating |
|---|---|
| AllMusic | 2.5/5 stars |

Celebrate This Heartbeat is an album by Randy Stonehill, released in 1984, on Myrrh Records.

== Track listing ==
All songs written by Randy Stonehill except where otherwise noted.

Side one

1. "Overture: Celebrate This Heartbeat" (Randy Stonehill, Tom Howard) – 3:25
2. "Still, Small Voice" – 4:04
3. "Celebrate This Heartbeat" – 4:08
4. "Modern Myth" – 3:51
5. "Who Will Save the Children" – 5:27

Side two

1. "When I Look to the Mountains" – 3:41
2. "Allison" – 3:18
3. "Watcha Gonna Do About That" – 3:19
4. "Stop the World" – 4:34
5. "I'll Remember You" – 4:26

This album has not been released on CD.

== Personnel ==
- Randy Stonehill – acoustic guitars, all vocals (1, 3, 6–10), lead vocals (2, 4, 5), backing vocals (2, 4, 5), "Ventures" guitar (9), rhythm section and vocal arrangements
- Tom Howard – acoustic piano, electric grand piano, synthesizers, timpani, orchestral arrangements and conductor, backing vocals (2, 5)
- Danny Jacob – electric guitars
- Mark Heard – electric 12-string guitar, harmonica (3), slide guitar solos (7, 8), bass (8, 9)
- Tim Chandler – bass (1–7, 10)
- John Mehler – drums (1–8, 10)
- Rick Geragi – congas, bongos, percussion, DMX programming (9)
- Jay "Shotgun" Leslie – baritone saxophone, tenor saxophone, flute
- John Clarke – flute, English horn
- Barbara Northcutt – oboe
- Darrel Gardner – French horn
- Michael Amorosi – harp
- Barry Miller Kaye – rhythm section and vocal arrangements
- Dori Howard – backing vocals (2, 5)
- David Edwards – backing vocals (4)
- Tonio K. – backing vocals (4)
- Phil Keaggy – lead vocals (5)
- Rachel Anderson, Amy Eason, Audrey Floyd and Moses Toth – children's voices (5)

== Production ==
- Produced by Barry Miller Kaye
- Engineered by Mark Heard
- Second Engineer – Dan Reed
- Cross-Fades and Editing at Wildor Brothers Recording Studios (Los Angeles, California).
- Mastered by Steve Hall at Future Disc Systems, Inc. (North Hollywood, California).
- Art Direction – Tim Aldersen
- Photography – Aaron Rapoport
