= Return to Paradise (Randy Stonehill album) =

Studio album by Randy Stonehill
- Released: 1989
- Recorded: February–June 1989
- Studio: Fingerprint Recorders (Los Angeles, California); Neverland Studios (Nashville, Tennessee)
- Genre: Contemporary Christian, folk rock
- Length: 50:06
- Label: Myrrh
- Producer: Mark Heard

Randy Stonehill chronology
Can't Buy a Miracle (1988)	Return to Paradise (1989)	Until We Have Wings (1990)

Professional ratings
Review scores
Source	Rating
AllMusic	4/5 stars

Return to Paradise is an album by Randy Stonehill, released in 1989, on Myrrh Records. The title is a reference to Stonehill's earlier album, Welcome to Paradise.

This album was listed at No. 76 in the 2001 book, CCM Presents: The 100 Greatest Albums in Christian Music.

== Track listing ==
All songs written by Randy Stonehill except as otherwise noted.

=== Side one ===
1. "Starlings" – 5:00
2. "Stand Like Steel" – 4:55
3. "I Don't Ever Want to Live Without You" (Pierce Pettis) – 4:10
4. "This Friend of Old" (David Edwards) – 4:00
5. "You Can Still Walk Tall" – 5:00
6. "True Blood" – 5:02

=== Side two ===
1. "Strong Hand of Love" (Mark Heard) – 2:54
2. "Christmas at Denny's" – 5:53
3. "Love Tells No Lies" – 4:20
4. "Weight of the Sky" – 3:28
5. "Ready To Go" – 4:44

== Personnel ==
- Randy Stonehill – lead vocals, acoustic guitars, backing vocals (3)
- Mark Heard – accordion, electric guitars, mandolin, bass (2, 9), tambourine (7)
- Phil Keaggy – classical guitar (3), 12-string guitar (9)
- Greg Leisz – pedal steel guitar, lap steel guitar
- Bill Batstone – fretless bass
- David Miner – acoustic bass
- Tom Willett – bass (7)
- Doug Matthews – drums
- David Baker – percussion
- Joe Weed – fiddle, viola
- Pam Dwinell – backing vocals

== Production ==
- Tom Willett – executive producer
- Mark Heard – producer, recording, mixing
- Randy Stonehill – co-producer
- Derri Daugherty – second engineer
- Gary Gerhart – second engineer
- Dave Hackbarth – second engineer
- Stephen Padgett – second engineer
- Dan Reed – second engineer
- Tom Baker – mastering at Future Disc Systems (Hollywood, California)
- Laurie Fink – cover coordinator
- Karl Shields – art direction, design
- Linda Krikorian – photography
- Roseanne McIIvane – hair stylist, make-up
- Ray Ware – management
