= High Noon (Mark Heard album) =

Compilation album by Mark Heard
- Released: 1993
- Studio: Fingerprint Recorders
- Genre: Folk/Rock
- Label: Fingerprint
- Producer: Mark Heard

Mark Heard chronology
Satellite Sky (1992)	High Noon (1993)	Mystery Mind (2000)

Professional ratings
Review scores
Source	Rating
AllMusic	4.5/5 stars

High Noon is a "best of" and rarities collection by Mark Heard, posthumously released in 1993, on Heard's own Fingerprint Records.

The album consists of primarily tracks from Heard's final three albums, 1990's Dry Bones Dance, 1991's Second Hand and 1993's Satellite Sky. The new tracks that are added are "My Redeemer Lives", from the 1992 Derri Daugherty/Steve Hindalong produced various artists album, At the Foot of the Cross, three previously unheard songs, "She's Not Afraid", "No" and "Shaky Situation" and a rough demo of "What Kind of a Friend", recorded on a poorly tuned upright piano.

== Track listing ==
All songs written by Mark Heard.

1. "Strong Hand of Love"
2. "I Just Wanna Get Warm"
3. "Look Over Your Shoulder"
4. "My Redeemer Lives"
5. "Another Day in Limbo"
6. "She's Not Afraid"
7. "The Dry Bones Dance"
8. "House of Broken Dreams"
9. "Everything Is Alright"
10. "Hammers and Nails"
11. "Love Is So Blind"
12. "Nod Over Coffee"
13. "Love Is Not the Only Thing"
14. "No"
15. "Shaky Situation"
16. "Orphans of God"
17. "What Kind of a Friend"
18. "Treasure of the Broken Land"
