= Mosaics (Mark Heard album) =

Studio album by Mark Heard
- Released: 1985
- Studio: Fingerprint Recorders, Montrose, California
- Genre: Folk, rock
- Label: Home Sweet Home
- Producer: Mark Heard

Mark Heard chronology
Ashes and Light (1984)	Mosaics (1985)	Tribal Opera (1987)

Professional ratings
Review scores
Source	Rating
AllMusic	3/5 stars

Mosaics is an album by Mark Heard, released in 1985 on Home Sweet Home Records. According to the liner notes in Ashes and Light, this album was recorded first but delayed by the record company who wanted the less rock-oriented Ashes released first. Consequently, this was the first album recorded in Heard's own Fingerprint Recording Studio.

== Album cover ==
The cover art included a mosaic of a photo of Heard. The photo was cut up into tiny squares. The sections were then sent to friends, musicians and onlookers to paint or scribble on. The pieces were brought back together and reassembled in a computer for the final album cover. The cover artists were Tim Alderson, Bill Batstone, Christian Benz, T-Bone Burnett, Tim Chandler, Nancy Clark, Dave de Coup-Crank, Terry Currin, Vernettie Currin, Alex Disch, David Edwards, Rowena Emmett-Stelmach, Maria Finch Chandler, Margrit Geissler, Peter Geissler, Hansruedi Graf, Heard's wife Janet, Heard's parents Jean and John Heard, Mark Heard, Susan Heard, actor Jerry Houser, Tom Howard, Tonio K., Barry Miller Kaye, Martin Kurz, L'Abri volunteers, Christa Laderach, Peter Laderach, Angy von Lerber, Jean Daniel von Lerber, Ed McTaggart, John Mehler, Lynda Mehler, Sye and Ina Mitchell, Leslie Phillips, Gian Sandri, Prisca Sandri, Edith Schaeffer, David Stelmach, Randy Stonehill, Terry Scott Taylor, Pam Terry, Pat Terry, Christie Tickner, David Tickner, Ray and Sue Ware.

== Track listing ==
All songs written by Mark Heard, except "Power of Love" by T-Bone Burnett and "Miracle" by Mark Heard and Tonio K.

Side one

1. "With Broken Wings" - 4:18
2. "Schizophrenia" - 3:46
3. "All Is Not Lost" - 2:54
4. "Heart On the Line" - 4:11
5. "He Plays the Game" - 3:09

Side two

1. "The Golden Age" - 4:11
2. "The Power of Love " - 3:46
3. "I Want You" - 3:52
4. "It Will Not Be Like This Forever" - 4:21
5. "Miracle" - 4:53

== Personnel ==
The band

- Mark Heard - electric 6- and 12-string guitars, acoustic guitars, lead guitar, bass guitars, vocals, assorted sounds, backing vocals ("Miracle", "Schizophrenia")
- John Mehler - drums
- David McSparran - Simmons drums on "Power of Love" and "Miracle"
- David Mansfield - lead guitar on "Heart of Hearts", "Schizo", "I Want You", and "Forever".
- Bill Batstone - bass guitar on "Forever", general hanging out
- Harry Stinson - percussion, Simmons drums
- Buddy Rufus Greene - harmonica on "All is Not Lost" and "The Golden Age"
- Tom Howard - synthesizer on "Golden Age", "Schizo" and "All is Not Lost"
- Barry Miller Kaye - organ on "Forever"
- Leslie Phillips - backing vocals except on "Schizophrenia" and "Miracle"
- Dave de Coup-Crank - backing vocals ("Miracle")
- Dori Howard - backing vocals ("Schizophrenia")

Production notes

- Mark Heard - producer, engineer, mixing at Fingerprint Recorders, arranger, cover design, computer art
- Janet Heard - punch-ins
- Dave de Coup Crank - punch-ins
- Nick van Maarth - punch-ins
- Tim Alderson - punch-ins, front cover concept
- Stewart Ivester - photography
