= Satellite Sky =

Studio album by Mark Heard
- Released: 1992
- Studio: Fingerprint Recorders; Dodge City Studios; Mama Jo's; Bedrock Studios, Los Angeles
- Genre: Folk, rock
- Label: Fingerprint
- Producer: Mark Heard

Mark Heard chronology
Second Hand (1991)	Satellite Sky (1992)	High Noon (1993)

Professional ratings
Review scores
Source	Rating
AllMusic	4/5 stars

Satellite Sky is the final album by Mark Heard, released in 1992, on Heard's own Fingerprint Records, shortly before his death.

The album, which was almost entirely written on a mandolin, prominently features Heard's own 1939 National Steel electric mandolin.

== Track listing ==
All songs written by Mark Heard.

1. "Tip of My Tongue" – 4:22
2. "Satellite Sky" – 3:48
3. "The Big Wheels Roll" – 4:02
4. "Orphans of God" – 6:22
5. "Another Day In Limbo" – 4:31
6. "Language of Love" – 4:06
7. "Freight Train to Nowhere" – 4:30
8. "Long Way Down" – 4:42
9. "A Broken Man" – 5:42
10. "Love Is So Blind" – 3:15
11. "Hammers and Nails" – 4:41
12. "We Know Too Much" – 5:58
13. "Lost on Purpose" – 4:20
14. "Nothing But the Wind" – 3:32
15. "Treasure of the Broken Land" – 6:22

== Personnel ==
The band

- David Raven – drums
- Michael Been – bass guitar
- Fergus Jemison Marsh – stick
- Mark Heard – electric steel mandolin, electric guitars, acoustic guitars and mandolins, Hammond organ, accordion and harmonica.
- Buddy Miller – electric guitar
- Jack Sherman – electric guitar
- Mark Goldenberg – electric guitar
- David Miner – standup bass
- Jim Goodwin – horns
- David Baker – African percussion
- Doug Berch – hammered dulcimer, mountain dulcimer
- Sam Phillips – backing vocals
- Pam Dwinell-Miner – backing vocals
- Dan Russell – backing vocals
- Joel Russell – backing vocals

Production notes

- Mark Heard – producer for Fingerprint Productions, engineer, mixing at Fingerprint Recorders, design, artwork
- Dan Russell – co-producer
- Jim Scott – co-producer
- Chuck Long – production associate
- Jim Scott – engineer at Dodge City, Mama Jo's and Bedrock, Los Angeles
- Jeff Shannon- assistant engineer
- Conrad Kalil- assistant engineer
- Richard Benoit- assistant engineer
- Joel Russell- assistant engineer
- Chris Morris – assistant engineer (misspelled as Chris Morse in liner notes)
- Patrick House – photography
- Fingerprint – digital editing, graphics
- Design by Fran Larson – frame
