= Stories (Randy Stonehill album) =

Compilation album by Randy Stonehill
- Released: 1993
- Studio: New tracks: The Green Room; Huntington Beach, California
- Genre: Folk, rock
- Label: Myrrh
- Producer: New tracks: Terry Scott Taylor

Randy Stonehill chronology
Wonderama (1991)	Stories (1993)	Lazarus Heart (1994)

Professional ratings
Review scores
Source	Rating
AllMusic	3/5 stars

Stories is the title of a compilation CD by Randy Stonehill, released in 1993 on Myrrh Records.

All of the tracks were released on previous albums by Stonehill (some of which remain unavailable on CD to this day), except "I Thirst For You," "Charlie the Weatherman," and the Acoustic Version of "Hope of Glory." These new tracks were recorded at The Green Room, with the Lost Dogs and Terry Scott Taylor producing.

"This record is dedicated with love to the memory of John Mark Heard, who always told the true story."

== Track listing ==
All songs written by Randy Stonehill except as otherwise noted.

=== Side one ===
1. "I Thirst For You" – 5:49
2. "Still, Small Voice" – 4:06 (from Celebrate This Heartbeat)
3. "Rachel Delevoryas" – 3:19 (from Wonderama)
4. "Bells" – 4:15 (from Love Beyond Reason)
5. "Starlings" – 5:01 (from Return to Paradise)
6. "Turning Thirty" – 3:46 (from Equator)
7. "Coming Back Soon" – 4:46 (from Can't Buy a Miracle)

=== Side two ===
1. "Charlie the Weatherman" (Randy Stonehill, Terry Scott Taylor) – 5:54
2. "Sing in Portuguese" – 4:05 (from Wonderama)
3. "Weight of the Sky" – 3:28 (from Return to Paradise)
4. "Letter to My Family" – 4:35 (from Between the Glory and the Flame)
5. "Christmas at Denny's" – 5:53 (from Return to Paradise)
6. "Hope of Glory" (Acoustic Version) – 4:22 (original version from The Wild Frontier)

== Personnel ==
On "I Thirst for You" and "Charlie the Weatherman"

- Randy Stonehill with Lost Dogs (Terry Scott Taylor, Gene Eugene, Derri Daugherty and Mike Roe)
- Rob Watson – keyboards
- Greg Kellogg – pedal steel guitar on "Charlie the Weatherman"
- Burleigh Drummond – drums, percussion
- Randy Stonehill, Derry Daugherty and Riki Michele – backing vocals

== Production ==
- "I Thirst For You", "Charlie The Weatherman" and "Hope of Glory" produced by Terry Taylor.
- Executive Producer – Mark Maxwell
- Recorded by Gene Eugene
- Additional engineering by Drew Aldridge
- Recorded at the Green Room (Huntington Beach, California).
- Mastered by Steve Hall at Future Disc (North Hollywood, California).
