= Orphans of God =

Compilation album by Various Artists
- Released: 1996
- Genre: Contemporary Christian, folk
- Label: Fingerprint Records
- Producer: Dan Russell

Various Artists chronology
Strong Hand of Love (1994)	Orphans of God (1996)

Orphans of God is a 1996 two-CD compilation of songs performed by various artists in tribute to songwriter Mark Heard. Recorded and released after Heard's death in 1992, proceeds from the album benefit the Heard Family Fund. This album was listed at #25 in the book, CCM Presents: The 100 Greatest Albums in Christian Music.

Some of the tracks had been released in 1994 as part of the single disc collection Strong Hand of Love. One song from that album, Phil Keaggy's version of "I Always Do," was replaced by his version of "Everything Is Alright." Two tracks were dropped: "Castaway," by Bruce Carroll and "How to Grow Up Big and Strong," by Rich Mullins.

== Track listing ==
An asterisk denotes tracks that had appeared on 1994's Strong Hand of Love.

=== Disc one ===
1. "Orphans of God" (by Buddy and Julie Miller) *
2. "We Know Too Much" (by Michael Been) *
3. "Freight Train To Nowhere" (by Vigilantes of Love) *
4. "It's Not Your Fault" (by Ashley Cleveland) *
5. "I Just Wanna Get Warm" (by Dan Russell) *
6. "Satellite Sky" (by Kate Taylor) *
7. "Mercy of the Flame" (by Pat Terry)
8. "Rise From The Ruins" (by Brooks Williams)
9. "Strong Hand of Love" (by Bruce Cockburn) *
10. "What Kind of Friend" (by Victoria Williams) *
11. "House of Broken Dreams" (by The Williams Brothers)
12. "Tip of My Tongue" (by Tom Prasada-Rao)
13. "Everything Is Alright" (by Phil Keaggy)
14. "How To Grow Up Big and Strong" (by Olivia Newton-John)
15. "All She Wanted Was Love" (by Big Faith)
16. "Another Good Lie" (by Hezze)
17. "Treasure of the Broken Land" (by Chagall Guevara) *

=== Disc two ===
1. "Lonely Moon" (by Kevin Max) *
2. "Worry Too Much" (by Harrod and Funck)
3. "Fire" (by bob.)
4. "Big Wheels Roll" (by John Austin)
5. "Rise From The Ruins" (by Parmin Sisters)
6. "Watching the Ships Go Down" (by Iain)
7. "Another Day In Limbo" (by Tonio K.) *
8. "Love Is So Blind" (by Carolyn Arends)
9. "Nod Over Coffee" (by Pierce Pettis) *
10. "Remarks To Mr. McLuhan" (by Ramona Silver)
11. "Long Way Down" (by Swinging Steaks)
12. "Look Over Your Shoulder" (by Randy Stonehill & Pam Dwinell Miner) *
13. "Threw It Away" (by Glenn Kaiser)
14. "Dry Bones Dance" (by Colin Linden)
15. "Tip of My Tongue" (by The Choir) *
16. "Strong Hand of Love" (by Daniel Amos)
17. "Hammer and Nails" (by Marvin Etzioni formerly of Lone Justice)
