= Tom Howard (musician) =

American musician

- Also known as: Dorian
- Born: February 23, 1950
- Died: January 29, 2010 (aged 59) Nashville, Tennessee, U.S.
- Genres: Jesus music, contemporary Christian, Christian meditation music
- Instruments: Piano, vocals
- Years active: 1977–2010
- Labels: Solid Rock, NewPax, A&S, Maranatha!, Myrrh, Word, Media Arts Group, Unison, Vineyard Music
- Formerly of: Daniel Amos, Randy Stonehill, Larry Norman, Mark Heard

Tom Howard (February 23, 1950 – January 29, 2010) was an American pianist, musical arranger, and orchestral conductor.

In 1983, Howard helped the rock band Daniel Amos form the Alarma! Records label.

On January 29, 2010, Howard suffered a fatal heart attack while hiking with his wife, Dori at Edwin Warner Park in Nashville.

== Discography ==
=== Solo ===
- View from the Bridge, 1977, Solid Rock Records
- Danger in Loving You, 1981, NewPax Records
- One by One, Tom Howard & Billy Batstone, 1985, A&S Records/Maranatha! Music
- The Harvest, (Colours Series), 1985 Maranatha! Music (reissued in 2001 on Maranatha!'s Sanctuary series under the title Reflection)
- The Hidden Passage, Tom Howard Ensemble, 1986, Maranatha! Music (reissued on Maranatha!'s Sanctuary series under the title Shelter)
- Solo Piano, 1987, Horizon/Maranatha! Music (reissued in 2000 on Maranatha!'s Sanctuary series under the title Serenity and on Ambient Records' Emerging Artist Series as Flight to Boston renaming some of the titles.)
- Bamboo in Winter, 1991, Myrrh Records
- Beyond the Barriers, 1992, Word Records/Epic Records
- Hymns of Jesus, 1996, Straightway
- Hymns of Comfort, 2002 Campus Productions/Lifescapes
- RE:fresh You Satisfy, 2006 Shelter Cove Music (two CDs)
- RE:fresh In The Quiet Place, 2006 Shelter Cove Music
- Breathe, 2006, Vineyard Music
- Our Love Is Here to Stay, 2007 Shelter Cove Music
- RE:fresh Near to the Heart of God, 2007 Shelter Cove Music
- Scenes from the Life of Christ, 2009 Ligonier Ministries
- Tom Howard – Piano Christmas: Fifteen Classic Piano Carols, 2009, Kingsway Music

=== For Thomas Kinkade ===
- Reflections of Light, 1998, Media Arts Group
- This Quiet Place, 1999, Media Arts Group
- Mountain Vistas, 1999, Media Arts Group
- Christmas Traditions, 1999, Media Arts Group

=== Repackaged under Thomas Kinkade set entitled Seasons: Peace & Love ===
In this set the following renames apply.

- Tranquil Autumn is Reflections of Light
- Celebration of Winter is Christmas Traditions
- Sounds of Spring is This Quiet Place
- Reflections of Summer is Mountain Vistas

=== Under pseudonyms ===
as Dorian

- Passage to Adventure, 1999, Unison Music
- Passage to Tranquillity, 1999, Unison Music
- Passage to Mystery, 1999, Unison Music
- Passage to Peace, 1999, Unison Music
- Passage to Joy, 1999, Unison Music
- Passage to Romance, 1999, Unison Music

== Selected contributions ==
- Streams of White Light Into Darkened Corners, Larry Norman, 1977, Piano, Harmonies.
- Strangers in a Strange Land, Salvation Air Force, 1977, Piano.
- Freedom Flight, James Sundquist, 1977, Piano, Synthesizer, Harpsichord, Strings, Horn Arrangement, Production Assistance.
- Lead Me Home, Dave Mattson, 1978, Piano, Fender Rhodes.
- Through Every Storm, Emmaus Road, 1978, String Arrangements.
- Stagecoach, Dennis Litchfield, 1978, String Arrangements.
- You Turn Me Around, The Sharretts, 1978, Songwriter.
- Come Back Soon, Various (featured on two tracks by Stratton/Howard Band), 1978.
- Sunday Drivers, The Eli Band, 1979, Keyboards, Vocal Assistance, Production (two tracks).
- Gentle Touch, Gerry Limpic, 1979.
- Stumbling Heavenward, Salmond and Mulder, 1979, Acoustic and Electric Piano.
- Paint Your Windows White (45 RPM Single), Malcolm Wild and the Band "Samuel", 1979, O.B.X. Synthesizer.
- Greenbelt Live! Original Soundtrack Recording , Various (featured on two tracks by Randy Stonehill and Larry Norman), 1979, Keyboards.
- Appalachian Melody, Mark Heard, 1979, Keyboards and Orchestration.
- Fingerprint, Mark Heard, 1980, Piano and Synthesizer.
- Roll Away the Stone, Larry Norman, 1980, Piano.
- The Sky is Falling, Randy Stonehill, 1980, Orchestration, Piano, Moog, Keyboards.
- Taste and See, Rob Mehl, 1980, Keyboards, Acoustic Guitar, Background Vocals.
- From His Heart And Mine, Holly Faith, 1980, Keyboards.
- Arrowhead, Wayne Johnson, 1980, Vocals.
- Rebel to the Wrong, Dennis Agajanian, 1981, Keyboards, Backing Vocals.
- Back to the Rock, Various (featured on one track by Rob Mehl), 1981.
- Between the Glory and the Flame, Randy Stonehill, 1981, Songwriter, Synthesizer String Arranger, Piano, Harmonium, Acoustic Guitar, Background Vocals.
- This Side of Heaven (Milk & Honey), Beau MacDougall, 1981, Keyboards.
- Stop the Dominoes, Mark Heard, 1981, Keyboards.
- Victims of the Age, Mark Heard, 1982, Keyboards.
- Red Alert, Malcolm and the Mirrors, 1982, Keyboards.
- Praise Six: Come and Sing Praises, Various Artists, 1982, Songwriter.
- Bye Bye Baby/Look My Way, The Crosstones, 1982, String Arrangements.
- Eye of the Storm, Mark Heard, 1983, Keyboards.
- Equator, Randy Stonehill, 1983, Keyboards, Choir and Background Vocals.
- Doppelganger, Daniel Amos, 1983, Keyboards.
- Film at Eleven, Pat Terry, 1983, E-mu Systems Emulator, Voice Programming, and Emulator Arranger.
- Back to the Rock #2, Various, 1983, Background Vocals (featured on one track by Bill Batstone).
- Closer, Wendell Burton, 1983, Synthesizers, Background Vocals.
- The Vision, Darrell Mansfield, 1983, Keyboards, Background Vocals.
- Tried by Fire, George Nasif, 1983, Keyboards.
- The Wedding Album, Various Artists, 1983, Arranger, Songwriter.
- Psalms Alive!, Maranatha! Singers, 1983, Songwriter.
- Praise Seven, Various Artists, 1984, Vocals, Songwriter.
- Psalms Alive! 2, Calvary Chapel Worship Community, 1984, Songwriter, Producer.
- Let the World Rejoice! A Musical Celebration of Christmas, Various Artists, 1984, Producer, Arranger, Conductor.
- Quiet Night, Larry Norman, 1984, Songwriter.
- Celebrate This Heartbeat, Randy Stonehill, 1984, Songwriter, Orchestration, Arranger, Piano, Synthesizers, Tympani, Background Vocals.
- Ashes and Light, Mark Heard, 1984, Synthesizer.
- Mosaics, Mark Heard, 1985, Synthesizer.
- Love Beyond Reason, Randy Stonehill, 1985, Songwriter.
- Dreams, Tales and Lullabies, David Edwards, 1985, Orchestration.
- Heart of Eternity, Wendell Burton, 1985, Producer, Arranger, Songwriter, Keyboards, Background Vocals.
- Fight the Fight, Various Artists, 1985, Choir Vocals.
- Psalms Alive! 3, Maranatha! Singers, 1986, Songwriter, Producer, Choir Arrangements, Tracking.
- Rejoice! Rejoice! Inspiring orchestral renderings of the world's best-loved Christmas caroles, Various Artists, 1986, Producer, Arranger, Conductor, Piano, Pipe Organ, Auxiliary Keyboards.
- Way Back Home, Phil Keaggy, 1986, String Arrangements, Woodwind Arrangement.
- The Wild Frontier, Randy Stonehill, 1986, Synthesizer, Arranger.
- Knowledge & Innocence, Terry Scott Taylor, 1986, Background vocals.
- A Briefing for the Ascent, Terry Scott Taylor, 1987, Background Vocals.
- Abba – 18 Songs to the Father, Various Artists, 1988, Songwriter.
- Hallelujah: 16 Songs of Joyful Boasting, Various Artists/The Maranatha Singers, 1988, Orchestration.
- Until We Have Wings, Randy Stonehill, 1990, Orchestrations and Keyboards.
- Dr. Edward Daniel Taylor: The Miracle Faith Telethon, Terry Scott Taylor, 1990, Background Vocals.
- Wide Angle, John Fischer, 1992, Keyboards, Choir Arrangement and Conducting.
- Out of the Wilderness, Dennis Agajanian, 1992, Piano, Backing Vocals.
- At the Foot of the Cross, Volume 2: Seven Last Words of Christ, Various Artists, 1992, 9and more.
- Miracle Mile, Guardian, 1993, String Arranger.
- Chase The Buffalo, Pierce Pettis, 1993, Piano.
- Reflections of a Former Life, Mark Heard, 1993, Keyboards.
- Way Back Home, Phil Keaggy, 1994, String Arrangements, Woodwind Arrangement.
- Swing, Swang, Swung, Guardian, 1994, String Arranger.
- My Faith Will Stay, Cheri Keaggy, 1995, Conductor, Orchestral Arrangements.
- Noel, Various, 1995, Orchestral Arrangements.
- Sugar Pistol, Fluffy, 1995, Piano, Strings.
- Speckled Bird, The Choir, 1995, Orchestrated.
- Christmas is Jesus, Bryan Duncan, 1995, Piano, Strings, Orchestral Arrangements.
- Windows of Heaven, John Elefante, 1995, Songwriter, Strings.
- No Doubt, Petra, 1995, String Arranger and Conductor.
- Strangelanguage, Charlie Peacock, 1996, String Conductor.
- Conviction, Michael O'Brien, 1996, String Arrangements.
- Avalon, Avalon, 1996, String Arranger and Conductor.
- Listen, Cindy Morgan, 1996, String Arranger and Conductor.
- Blink, Rick Elias, 1997, Piano.
- Gift, Jim Brickman, 1997, String Arrangements.
- The Waiting, The Waiting, 1997, String Arrangements and Conductor.
- Sixpence None the Richer, Sixpence None the Richer, 1997, Piano.
- Rock Music w/Singing, Duraluxe, 1997, Piano, Strings.
- Thirst, Randy Stonehill, 1998, Piano, Background Vocals, String Arrangements.
- Live the Life, Michael W. Smith, 1998, String Arrangements and Conductor.
- Christmastime, Michael W. Smith, 1998, Orchestration, Orchestral Arrangements, Choir Arrangement.
- The Loving Kind, Cindy Morgan, 1998, String Arranger and Conductor.
- Perennial: Songs for the Seasons of Life, Twila Paris, 1998, Orchestral Arrangements, Choir Arrangement.
- The Jesus Record, Rich Mullins & a Ragamuffin Band, 1998, Percussion, Piano, Arranger, Conductor, String Arrangements, Wurlitzer, Orchestra Assembly.
- Phil Keaggy, Phil Keaggy, 1998, Piano, Conductor, Horn Arrangements, Orchestral Arrangements, String Quartet.
- Touched by an Angel: The Album, Television Soundtrack, 1998, String Arrangements.
- Listen, Michelle Tumes, 1998, String Arrangements.
- Corner of Eden, Kathy Troccoli, 1998, Piano, Orchestration, Director.
- Stories From the Heart, Bob Carlisle, 1998, Songwriter, Orchestrated, Arranged, Piano, Background Vocals.
- Majesty and Wonder, Phil Keaggy & London Festival Orchestra, 1999, Orchestral Arrangements.
- True North, Twila Paris, 1999, Orchestral Arrangements, Conductor.
- At the Foot of the Cross: God of All of Me, Various Artists, 1999, Arranger.
- Love and Poverty, Christine Glass, 1999, Keyboards.
- Beggar's Paradise, Chris Rodriguez, 1999, String Arranger and Conductor, Hammond Organ.
- Candycoatedwaterdrops, Plumb, 1999, String Arranger and Conductor.
- Devotion, Aaron Neville, 2000, Conductor, String Arrangements.
- Prayers of a Ragamuffin, A Ragamuffin Band, 2000, Piano, Conductor, Orchestration.
- City on a Hill: Songs of Worship and Praise, Various Artists, 2000, Orchestral Arrangement, Conductor.
- Roaring Lambs, Various Artists, Squint Entertainment 2000, Orchestral Arrangement, Conductor.
- Nothing But the Truth, Bob Carlisle, 2000, String Arrangements.
- Lay It Down, Jennifer Knapp, 2000, String Arrangements, Conductor.
- Strings Attached: Live with the Youngstown Symphony, Glass Harp, 2001, Arranger.
- If We Pray, Anointed, 2001, String Arrangements.
- Elementary, Cindy Morgan, 2001, Strings.
- Joy Williams, Joy Williams, 2001, Acoustic Piano.
- Love Falls Down, Sheila Walsh, 2001, String Arrangements, String Orchestration, String Conductor, Keyboards.
- Praise & Worship Live!, Various, 2001, Producer, Arranger, Piano, Keyboards.
- The Hymns Collection, Sheila Walsh, 2002, Arrangements.
- Songs of Israel, Marty Goetz, 2003, Arrangements, Orchestration.
- New Irish Hymns #3: Incarnation, Margaret Becker, Kristyn Getty, Joanne Hogg, 2004, Arrangements, Orchestration, Programming, Songwriter.
- Sessions, Larry Norman, 2004.
- Those Were the Days, Dolly Parton, 2005, Strings, String Arrangements, Choir Arrangement.
- Come Let Us Adore Him: A Christmas Worship Experience, Various Artists, 2005, Piano, Keyboards, String Orchestration, Conductor.
- Very Best of Michelle Tumes, Michelle Tumes, 2006, Conductor.
- Dream Again, Phil Keaggy, 2006, Keyboard.
- Christmas Songs, Jars of Clay, 2007, Horn and String Arrangements.
- Mockingbird, Allison Moorer, 2008, String Arrangements, String Conductor.
- The Dawn of Grace, Sixpence None the Richer, 1998, String Arrangements, String Conductor.
- Christmas Peace, Solveig, 2008, String Arrangements.
- EP, Jessie Kol, 2009, Co-producer, Songwriter, Arranger.
- Welcome Inn: A Phil Keaggy Christmas, Phil Keaggy, 2009, Piano, String Arrangements.
- I Hear Angels, Sheila Walsh, 2010, Arrangements, Keyboards.
- Out From the Door, Dylan McDonald, 2010, Conductor, String Arrangements.
- Give Me Jesus (single release to help Haitian aid effort), Solveig, 2010, String Arrangements.
- Roots of Love, Kevin Gould, 2011, Keyboard.
- Too Slow to Disco, Volume 3, Various (featured on one track by Rob Mehl), 2017, Keyboards, Background Vocals.
