= Phil and John =

English Christian music duo

Phil and John was a contemporary Christian music duo from Mansfield who recorded and toured throughout the 1980s and 1990s.

== History ==
Phil and John were Phil Baggaley and John Hartley, childhood friends who first started playing together at the age of 13. Their performances, which included an appearance at the Greenbelt festival in 1989, typically incorporated music and comedy. Although no longer performing and recording as a group, both remained within the music business: Baggaley went on to establish Christian record label Gold Records, while Hartley moved to Nashville, Tennessee and became director of A&R for Worship Together Records.

=== The Wood Thieves ===
Whilst known for contemporary worship music as Phil and John, the duo also recorded secular music as "The Wood Thieves". Their most notable release in this capacity was a single with The Grimethorpe Colliery Band and was a response to announcement of the closure of Grimethorpe Colliery.

== Awards ==
- Special International GMA Dove Award 1990.

== Discography ==
=== Studio albums ===
- Count Me Out, Kingsway Music, 1983
- Waiting for Summer, Kingsway Music, 1985
- Lonely Dancer, What? Records, 1987
- Don't Look Now...It's The Hallelujah Brothers, What? Records, 1989
- Shine Like America, What? Records, 1990
- Carnival of Clowns, R Records, 1992
- Providence, Phoenix Records, 1997

=== Live albums ===
- Phil and John Live, What? Records, 1990
- Breakfast at Ruby's, Kingsway Music, 1994

=== Compilation albums ===
- Goodbye Yesterday: The Very Best of Phil And John, What? Records, 1992
- Simply Phil and John, Kingsway Music, 1995

=== Singles ===
- You Wouldn't Let Me Go, Kingsway Music, 1982
- The Day the North Left Town (performing as The Wood Thieves, with The Grimethorpe Colliery Band), Rumour Records, 1992

=== Live videos ===
- Live, What? Records, 1992

== See also ==
- Gold records
