= Victims of the Age =

Studio album by Mark Heard
- Released: 1982
- Recorded: Poiema Studios; Camarillo, California; The Gold Mine; Los Angeles, California
- Genre: Folk/rock
- Label: Home Sweet Home
- Producer: Mark Heard

Mark Heard chronology
| Stop the Dominoes (1981) | Victims of the Age (1982) | Eye of the Storm (1983) |

Professional ratings
Review scores
| Source | Rating |
|---|---|
| Allmusic | 4.5/5 stars |

Victims of the Age is an album by Mark Heard, released in 1982 on Home Sweet Home Records. This album was listed at #32 in the book CCM Presents: The 100 Greatest Albums in Christian Music (Harvest House Publishers, 2001).

"Heart of Hearts" later became a hit on Christian Radio when it was covered by Leslie Phillips.

== Track listing ==
All songs written by Mark Heard.

=== Side one ===
1. "Victims of the Age" - 3:18
2. "City Life Won't Let Up" - 3:43
3. "Faces in Cabs" - 3:12
4. "Nothing is Bothering Me" - 3:55
5. "Some Folks' World" - 4:36

=== Side two ===
1. "Growing Up Blind" - 4:39
2. "Dancing at the Policeman's Ball" - 3:59
3. "Everybody Loves a Holy War" - 4:27
4. "Heart of Hearts" - 3:08

== The band ==
- Mark Heard - electric 6- and 12-string guitars, electric lead and slide guitars, vocals, percussion, harmonica, accordion, mandolin
- John Mehler - drums
- Bill Batstone - bass guitar
- Carl Pickhardt - keyboards
- Tom Howard - keyboards
- Harry Stinson - tambourine, shaker
- Mark Heard, Larry Norman, Leslie Phillips, Bill Batstone.- backing vocals

== Production notes ==
- Engineered by Mark Heard, Bill Cobb, Janet Sue Heard
- Recorded January–February 1982 at Poiema Studio, Camarillo, California, and at The Gold Mine, Los Angeles, California
- Mixed by Mark Heard at Wilder Brothers Studios, West Los Angeles
- Mastered at A&M by Bernie Grundman
- Cover design by Mark Heard
- Photographs by Janet Sue Heard

"Thanks to Bill and Marsha, John and Linda, Billy, Guy (#8) Denton, Linda at Laursens, Chris and Shanon, Daryl and Dawn, Tom and Dori, Jonathan, and the Benson folks. Love to the Circle of Cynics, Pat and Pam Terry, the Strat Brothers. Chuck and Sandra Perefit, Jon and Diane, Jean and the Screaming Cheese Band in Zurich, the L'Abri folks in Huemoz and Chesieres, Calhoun, Peter and Becky, and my folks."
