= I Could Never Say Goodbye =

I Could Never Say Goodbye may refer to:

- "I Could Never Say Goodbye", a duet with Amy Grant by Randy Stonehill from Love Beyond Reason, 1985
- "I Could Never Say Goodbye", a song by Enya from Dark Sky Island
