= Equator (Randy Stonehill album) =

Studio album by Randy Stonehill
- Released: 1983
- Studio: Whitefield Studios (Santa Ana, California)
- Genre: Christian rock, contemporary Christian, rock
- Length: 40:45
- Label: Myrrh
- Producer: Terry Scott Taylor

Randy Stonehill chronology
| Between the Glory and the Flame (1981) | Equator (1983) | Celebrate This Heartbeat (1984) |

Professional ratings
Review scores
| Source | Rating |
|---|---|
| AllMusic | 3/5 stars |

Equator is an album by Randy Stonehill, released in 1983, on Myrrh Records. It has not been released on CD.

== Track listing ==
All songs written by Randy Stonehill, except "Light of the World" by Randy Stonehill and Wayne Berry, and "Hide Them In Your Love" by Randy Stonehill and Gary Morris.

Side one

1. "Light of the World" – 4:10
2. "Big Ideas (In a Shrinking World)" – 4:37 {note: the original LP label and album cover has the title as "Big Ideas (In the Shrinking World)"}
3. "Shut De Dó" – 2:46
4. "Even the Best of Friends" – 4:52
5. "American Fast Food" – 3:19

Side two

1. "China" – 5:32
2. "Cosmetic Fixation" – 4:17
3. "Turning Thirty" – 3:49
4. "Hide Them In Your Love" – 3:29
5. "World Without Pain" – 3:54

== Personnel ==
Musicians

- Randy Stonehill – lead vocals, acoustic guitar, electric guitars
- Tom Howard – keyboards
- Mark Cook – additional keyboards (4)
- Rob Watson – additional keyboards (4, 7)
- Derri Daugherty – additional electric rhythm guitar (5, 6)
- Jim Nicholson – lead guitar (6, 9)
- Jerry Chamberlain – lead guitar (7)
- Tim Chandler – bass guitar, lead guitar (10)
- Alex MacDougall – drums (1–5, 7–10), percussion
- Ed McTaggart – drums (6)
- Terry Scott Taylor – drums (6)
- Doll (MacDougall) Gallienne – vibraphone (2), xylophone (2), bagpipes (2)
- Adrian Tapia – saxophone (4, 5), flute (6)

Handclaps (Tracks 3 & 5)

- Tim Alderson, Jerry Chamberlain, Sharon McCall, Randy Stonehill and Terry Scott Taylor

Backing vocals

- Randy Stonehill (1, 2, 4–10)
- Jerry Chamberlain (1, 2, 4–7, 9, 10)
- Tom Howard (1, 5, 6, 7, 9, 10)
- Ed McTaggart (5)
- Terry Scott Taylor (5, 9)
- Beau MacDougall (6)
- Janet McTaggart (7)
- Rachel Anderson (10)
- Shannon Berry (10)
- Audrey Floyd (10)
- Dori Howard (10)
- Jason Kinsley (10)
- Sharon McCall (10)
- Leslie Phillips (10)
- Colleen Routh (10)
- Moses Toth (10)

Jamaican choir on "Shut De Dó"

- Terry Bradford, Jerry Chamberlain, Jackie Goushé, Tom and Dori Howard, Regina Peoples, Sharon McCall, Regina Peoples, Shari Larson and Randy Stonehill

Vocal appearances

- Terry Scott Taylor – man in the audience (2)
- Jerry Chamberlain – Ethel Merman's assailant (2), fast food patron (5)
- Regina Peoples – female soloist (3)
- Jackie Goushé, Dori Howard, Shari Larson and Sharon McCall – singing waitresses (5)
- Janet McTaggart – "Star Trek" soprano solo (10)

== Production ==
- Produced by Terry Scott Taylor for "Rebel Base Productions".
- Engineered by Thom Roy
- Mastered by Steve Hall at Future Disc Systems (Hollywood, California).
- Album Cover Concept – Terry Taylor and Randy Stonehill
- Art Direction – Paul Gross/Paradise Graphics, Ltd.
- Illustration – Kurt Triffet
- Inner Sleeve Photography – Charles Allen
