= The Lazarus Heart =

Lazarus Heart may refer to:

- The Lazarus Heart (novel), a novel by Poppy Z. Brite
- The Lazarus Heart (album), an album by Randy Stonehill
- "The Lazarus Heart", a song on the Sting album ...Nothing Like the Sun
- A Lazarus heart refers to an event in which a person spontaneously returns to life (the heart starts beating again) after resuscitation has been given up.

== See also ==
- Lazarus syndrome
