= The Wild Frontier =

Studio album by Randy Stonehill
- Released: 1986
- Studio: The Music Grinder (Hollywood, California); Bill Schnee Studio (North Hollywood, California); Asaph Studios (Anaheim, California); Whitefield Studios (Costa Mesa, California); "Rock-Bus-O-Doom" Reelsound Bus (Nashville, Tennessee)
- Genre: Pop rock, hard rock, folk rock
- Length: 42:39
- Label: Myrrh
- Producer: Dave Perkins

Randy Stonehill chronology
Love Beyond Reason (1985)	The Wild Frontier (1986)	Can't Buy A Miracle (1988)

Professional ratings
Review scores
Source	Rating
AllMusic	4/5 stars

The Wild Frontier is an album by Randy Stonehill, released in 1986 on Myrrh Records.

== Track listing ==
All songs written by Randy Stonehill and Dave Perkins except where noted.

Side one

1. "The Wild Frontier" (Stonehill) – 4:07
2. "Here Come the Big Guitars" – 3:41
3. "The Dying Breed" – 4:15
4. "Words on the Wind" – 5:44
5. "What's My Line" – 3:47

Side two

1. "What Do You Want from Life" (Stonehill) – 3:48
2. "Get Together" (Chet Powers) – 3:50
3. "Defender" – 3:01
4. "Evangeline" (Stonehill) – 5:38
5. "The Hope of Glory" (Stonehill) – 4:48

== Personnel ==
- Randy Stonehill – vocals, acoustic guitar, electric guitars
- Reese "Mr. B-3" Wynans – keyboards
- Tom Howard – synthesizers, brass arrangements (10)
- Rob Watson – synthesizers
- Dave Perkins – synthesizers, acoustic guitar, electric guitars, bass guitar, percussion, backing vocals
- Peter Robb – programming
- Jerry Chamberlain – electric guitars, backing vocals
- Jerry McPherson – electric guitars
- Rick Cua – bass guitar
- Mike Mead – drums
- Keith Edwards – percussion
- Alex MacDougall – percussion
- John Lunden – horn contractor (10)
- Peter Case – backing vocals
- Gary Chapman – backing vocals
- Chris Harris – backing vocals
- Tonio K. – backing vocals
- Peter Noone – backing vocals

== Production ==
- Ray Ware – executive producer
- Dave Perkins – producer, engineer, mixing
- David Schober – engineer, mixing
- Randy Stonehill – mixing
- Malcolm Harper – additional engineer
- Gene Ford – second engineer
- Matt Freeman – second engineer
- Dan Garcia – second engineer
- Jon Ingoldsby – second engineer
- Casey McMackin – second engineer
- Bob Salcedo – second engineer
- Mama Jo's (North Hollywood, California) – mixing location
- Bernie Grundman – mastering at Bernie Grundman Mastering (Hollywood, California)
- Roland Young – cover art direction, design
- Howard Rosenburg – cover photography
- Sandi Stonehill – wardrobe, make-up, hair stylist
