= Strong Hand of Love: A Tribute to Mark Heard =

Strong Hand of Love

Compilation album by Various artists
- Released: 1994
- Genre: Folk
- Labels: Fingerprint, Myrrh
- Producer: Dan Russell

Various artists chronology
Strong Hand of Love (1994)	Orphans of God (1996)

Strong Hand of Love: A Tribute to Mark Heard is a compilation of songs by various artists in tribute to songwriter, Mark Heard.

It was recorded and released in 1994 after Heard's death in 1992. Proceeds benefit the Heard Family Fund.

In 1994, with Dan Russell as producer, the album was nominated for a Grammy in the Rock Gospel section.

In 1996, most of these tracks and many more were rereleased as the two-CD Orphans of God. One song, Phil Keaggy's version of "I Always Do", was replaced by his version of "Everything Is Alright". Two tracks were dropped completely for space on Orphans, "Castaway", by Bruce Carroll, and "How to Grow Up Big and Strong", by Rich Mullins.

== Track listing ==
1. "Lonely Moon" (by Kevin Max Smith)
2. "We Know Too Much" (by Michael Been)
3. "I Just Wanna Get Warm" (by Dan Russell)
4. "Strong Hand of Love" (by Bruce Cockburn)
5. "Satellite Sky" (by Kate Taylor)
6. "I Always Do" (by Phil Keaggy)
7. "Nod Over Coffee" (by Pierce Pettis)
8. "What Kind of Friend" (by Victoria Williams)
9. "Castaway" (by Bruce Carroll)
10. "How to Grow Up Big and Strong" (by Rich Mullins)
11. "It's Not Your Fault" (by Ashley Cleveland)
12. "Another Day In Limbo" (by Tonio K.)
13. "Look Over Your Shoulder" (by Randy Stonehill & Pam Dwinell Miner)
14. "Freight Train To Nowhere" (by Vigilantes of Love)
15. "Tip of My Tongue" (by The Choir)
16. "Orphans of God" (by Buddy and Julie Miller)
17. "Treasure of the Broken Land" (by Chagall Guevara)
