= Until We Have Wings =

Studio album by Randy Stonehill
- Released: 1990
- Studio: Fingerprint Recorders (Montrose, California); The Sound Factory (Hollywood, California); Martinsound (Alhambra, California)
- Genre: Folk, contemporary Christian music
- Length: 1:12:01
- Label: Myrrh
- Producer: Mark Heard

Randy Stonehill chronology
Return to Paradise (1989)	Until We Have Wings (1990)	Wonderama (1991)

Professional ratings
Review scores
Source	Rating
AllMusic	2/5 stars

Until We Have Wings is an album by Randy Stonehill, released in 1990, on Myrrh Records.

== Track listing ==
All songs written by Randy Stonehill, except where otherwise noted.

=== Side one (studio tracks) ===
1. "Faithful" (Randy Stonehill And Giovanni Audiori) – 3:24
2. "Didn't It Rain" – 6:11
3. "Born to Love" – 4:27
4. "Breath of God" – 2:59
5. "The History in Your Eyes" – 4:31
6. "Can Hell Burn Hot Enough" – 4:07
7. "Old Clothes" (Randy Stonehill, David Edwards) – 4:03

=== Side two (live tracks) ===
1. "Keep Me Runnin'" – 5:49
2. "Turning Thirty" – 4:39
3. "Ramada Inn" – 4:00
4. "Shut De Do" – 11:35
5. "Hymn" – 4:33
6. "Good News" – 8:00
7. "I'll Remember You" – 3:43

== Personnel ==
- Randy Stonehill – lead vocals, backing vocals, acoustic guitar
- Mark Heard – keyboards, acoustic guitar, electric guitars, bass
- Tom Howard – synthesizers (1, 4), string arrangements (7)
- Ken Medema – acoustic piano (7)
- Bill Batstone – bass, fretless bass
- David Miner – acoustic bass
- David Raven – drums
- Brad Dutz – percussion
- Jerry Chamberlain – backing vocals
- Pam Dwinell – backing vocals
- Sharon McCall – backing vocals

== Production ==
- Ray Ware – executive producer
- Tom Willett – executive producer
- Mark Heard – producer, recording, mixing
- Randy Stonehill – producer
- Bryan Soucy – second engineer
- Steve Hall – mastering at Future Disc (Hollywood, California)
- Hipke, Inc. – art direction, design
- Roz Roos – additional art direction
- David Roth – photography
- Annette Zeglen – hair, make-up
