= Kate Miner =

Kate Miner may refer to:

- Kate Miner (musician), American singer and songwriter
- Kate Miner (actress) (born 1984), American actress, model, and musician
