= Love Beyond Reason =

Studio album by Randy Stonehill
- Released: 1985
- Studio: Fingerprint Recorders (Montrose, California)
- Genre: Rock; pop; folk rock; contemporary Christian
- Length: 40:16 (LP release); 46:39 (CD release)
- Label: Myrrh
- Producer: Barry Miller Kaye

Randy Stonehill chronology
Celebrate This Heartbeat (1984)	Love Beyond Reason (1985)	The Wild Frontier (1986)

Professional ratings
Review scores
Source	Rating
Allmusic	2.5/5 stars

Love Beyond Reason is an album by Randy Stonehill, released in 1985, on Myrrh Records.

The album contained the hit single, "I Could Never Say Goodbye," which was a duet with singer Amy Grant. Grant had recently become one of the biggest names in Christian music, and had crossed over into the mainstream with her Unguarded album.

Stonehill also released a Love Beyond Reason Video collection in 1985 on VHS and Beta, which included videos of "Love Beyond Reason," "Until Your Love Broke Through," "Hymn," "You're Loved Tonight," "Still Small Voice," (from Stonehill's Celebrate this Hearbeat album) and "The Gods of Men."

== Track listing ==
All songs written by Randy Stonehill except where otherwise noted.

Side one

1. "I Could Never Say Goodbye" (Duet With Amy Grant) – 3:34
2. "Love Beyond Reason" – 3:36
3. "The Gods of Men" – 4:12
4. "Bells" – 4:19
5. "You're Loved Tonight" – 5:47

Side two

1. "Until Your Love Broke Thru" (Keith Green, Todd Fishkind, Randy Stonehill) – 4:01
2. "Hymn" – 2:46
3. "Angry Young Men" – 3:36
4. "Judgement Day" – 4:54
5. "Cross That Line" (Randy Stonehill, Tom Howard) – 3:31
  - Bonus track, available only on cassette and CD version
1. "The Gods of Men" (Extended Version) – 6:12

== Personnel ==
- Randy Stonehill – acoustic guitar, lead vocals (1–8, 10), backing vocals (1–7, 10), all other vocals (5), all vocals (9)
- Barry Miller Kaye – Fairlight CMI
- Andrea Saparoff – Fairlight CMI programming, Fairlight orchestral arrangements (7)
- Denver Smith – additional synthesizers (1), MIDI technician (1)
- Danny Jacob – lead guitars (1), guitar solo (2), "golden" guitars (3)
- Milo Carter – guitars
- Don Griffin – guitars
- Mark Heard – additional guitars (10)
- Steve Wilkinson – bass
- David Raven – drums
- Tim "Repo Man" Aller – Simmons drum programming
- Rick Geragi – bongos (1, 2, 9), congas (1, 6, 9), claves (1), tambourine (8), cabasa (8), percussion (9)
- Barry "The Bear" Liss – harmonica solo (8)
- Jay Leslie – soprano sax solo (9)
- Amy Grant – lead and harmony vocals (1)
- Caryn Robin – backing vocals (1, 2, 7)
- Táta Vega – backing vocals (1–3, 5–8), featured backing vocal (2, 8)
- Bryan Duncan – backing vocals (3, 5–7), featured backing vocal (3, 7)
- Richie Furay – backing vocals (4), featured backing vocal (4, 6)
- Tonio K. – backing vocals (10)

== Production ==
- Executive Producers – Ray Ware and Tom Willett
- Produced and Arranged by Barry Miller Kaye
- Engineered and Mixed by Mark Heard
- Second Engineer – Dan Reed
- Basic Tracks recorded using the Fingerprint Recorders Mobile Unit at the Sound Vault Studios (Sunland, California).
- All Fairlight CMI textures developed by Barry, Andrea and Randy at the Computer Music Lab, California State University (Northridge, California).
- Fairlight CMI Technicians – Jeff Forehan at Byte Size Productions for High Tech Instruments; and Bob Garrett at C.S.U.N.
- Mastered by Steve Hall at Future Disc Systems (Hollywood, California).
- Art Direction and Design – Roland Young
- Cover Photography – Lisa Powers
- Make-up – Dolli Melaine
- Group photo taken by Rose Berger at the La Brea Studios (Hollywood, California).
- Additional photos by Ray Ware
- Management – Ray Ware Artist Management
