= Wonderama (album) =

Studio album by Randy Stonehill
- Released: 1992
- Studio: Mixing Lab A (Garden Grove, California); Neverland Studios (Cerritos, California); Mixing Lab B (Huntington Beach, California); MicroNote (Pasadena, California); McCrummy Music (Whittier, California)
- Genre: Folk, rock
- Label: Myrrh
- Producer: Terry Scott Taylor

Randy Stonehill chronology
Until We Have Wings (1990)	Wonderama (1992)	Stories (1993)

Professional ratings
Review scores
Source	Rating
AllMusic	3/5 stars

Wonderama is an album by Randy Stonehill released in February 1992 on Myrrh Records. It contains several memorable songs and was his last major label album.

== Track listing ==
All songs written by Randy Stonehill except as otherwise noted.

1. "Wonderama" (Stonehill, Terry Taylor) – 6:20
2. "I Will Follow" (Stonehill, Taylor) – 3:00
3. "Barbie Nation" (Stonehill, Taylor) – 4:57
4. "Don't Be Sad" (Randy Stonehill, Angelo Natalie) – 4:15
5. "Rachel Delevoryas" – 3:19
6. "Intermission at the Wonderama" – 1:05
7. "Great Big Stupid World" (Stonehill, Taylor) – 5:47
8. "Sing in Portuguese" – 4:05
9. "Mice & Men" – 3:13
10. "The Lost Parade" – 4:14
11. "Lantern in the Snow" (Stonehill, Taylor) – 4:36
12. "Wonderama Postlude" (Stonehill, Taylor) – :42

== Personnel ==
The Wonderama Band

- Randy Stonehill – lead vocals (1–5, 7–11), backing vocals (1–4, 7, 9, 11), lead guitar (1), acoustic guitar (1, 2, 5, 7–11), guitars (3, 4, 12)
- Rob Watson – keyboards (1, 4, 9, 11), calliope (1, 9, 12), music box (1), bells (1, 8), marimba (2, 8), ballroom piano (3), backing vocals (3), string arrangements and conductor (5, 6), acoustic piano (7, 9), organ (7), horn arrangements and conductor (10), celesta (11)
- Rick Elias – second acoustic guitar (1, 7, 9, 11), second guitars (2), backing vocals (2), lead guitar (3), acoustic guitar (4), electric guitar (4), Nashville tenor guitar (4), lead acoustic guitar (8), lead electric guitar (10), guitars (12)
- Tim Chandler – bass (1, 3, 4, 7–12)
- David Raven – drums (1–4, 7–12)

Additional musicians

- Jerry Waller – accordion (1, 8, 12)
- Greg Flesch – lead guitar (7), EBow (7)
- Omar Domkus – stand-up bass (2)
- Burleigh Drummond – sleigh bells (1), glockenspiel (1, 11), cymbal swells (1, 11), chimes (1), kettle drums (1, 2, 11), shaker (1, 11), claves (2), congas (2), dream cymbals (4), percussion (7, 8, 10), Burleigh's Madhouse (7), tambourine (9), second snare (9), cowbell (9), bodhrán (10), snow bells (11)
- Robert Martin – cello (1, 5, 6)
- Dianne Ready – viola (5, 6)
- Michelle Richards – violin (2)
- Beth Falsom – violin (5, 6)
- Terry Glenn – violin (5, 6)
- Doug Webb – clay pipes (8, 11), ocarina (8), bass recorder (8), tenor ocarina (11)
- The Salvation Army Horns, Los Angeles Chapter – horns (10)
- Terry Scott Taylor – backing vocals (1, 11)
- Janet McTaggart – Muse of hope (1, 10)
- Linda Elias – backing vocals (2)
- Riki Michele – backing vocals (2, 3, 4, 11)
- Jerry Chamberlain – backing vocals (3, 4, 7, 9), lead guitar (9)
- Sharon McCall – backing vocals (4, 7)

Los Campesinos Mariachi Band – backing vocals on "Sing in Portuguese"

- Steve Luevano
- Steve Luevano Jr.
- Hilario Gonzalez
- Antonio Gonzalez

Boy's Choir on "Lantern in the Snow"

- Nolan McSparren
- Preston Geeting
- Abraham Handler

== Production ==
- Mark Maxwell – executive producer
- Ray Ware – executive producer
- Terry Scott Taylor – producer
- Gene Eugene – recording
- Steve Hall – mastering at Future Disc (Hollywood, California)
- Mixing Lab A, Garden Grove, California – recording location for basic track, percussion, backing vocals, keyboard
- Neverland Studios, Cerritos, California – recording location for lead vocals, guitar, string, keyboard, woodwind, accordion
- Mixing Lab B – recording location for background vocals, guitars, keyboards, percussion)
- MicroNote – recording location for horns, background vocals, strings
- McCrummy Music – recording location for background vocals
- Jerry and Sharon's Wax Lips Studio – pre–production demo recording location
- Mixing Lab A – mixing location
- Roz – art director
- Court Patton – artwork and design
- Tom Gulotta – artwork and design
- Patton Bros. Design, El Cajon, California – artwork and design
- Nick Nacca – photography
- Linda Krikorian – photography
