= Mark Heard (album) =

Studio album by Mark Heard
- Released: 1975, 1978
- Studio: Lemco Studios, Lexington, Kentucky
- Genre: Folk, Rock
- Label: Airborn
- Producer: Mark Heard

Mark Heard chronology
Setting Yesterday Free (1972)	Mark Heard (1975)	Appalachian Melody (1979)

Re-issue cover: On Turning to Dust

Mark Heard is the first solo album by Mark Heard, originally released in 1975, and re-released as On Turning to Dust on both AB Records and Solid Rock Records in 1978.

A limited edition CDR reissue of the original Mark Heard album was released to fans in 1998 through Fingerprint Records.

== Track listing ==
All songs written by Mark Heard, except "Cabin in Gloryland" by O. A. Parris, writer /Cpl. Curtis Stewart. "Greensleeves interlude" is a 16th-century English melody. "There is a Fountain" is an early American melody, words by William Cowper, 1771. "Passion Chorale" is by Hans Leo Hassler, 1601; harmony by J. S. Bach, 1729, words by Bernard of Clairvaux, 11th century. "Dinner at Grandma's" - by Mark Heard, Pat Terry, Jeff Vansant, Wayne King.

Side one

1. "On Turning to Dust"
2. "Dinner at Grandma's"
3. "Cabin in Gloryland"
4. "A Friend"
5. "Lullabye"

Side two

1. "Solid Rock"
2. "To Diane"
3. "Interlude (traditional: Greensleeves & There Is a Fountain)"
4. "The Road"
5. "Interlude (Traditional: Passion Chorale)"
6. "All"

== The band ==
- Mark Heard – guitars, vocals, piano, synthesizer and hambone
- Earl Grigsby – bass guitar
- Frank Godby – banjo
- John Heinrich – pedal steel guitar
- Chuck Long – sandblocks
- Jim Pennington – percussion
- Dave Aldrich – string arrangement
- Lamay String Quartet – string section

Production notes

- Cecil Jones – engineer
- Mark and Janet Sue Heard – photography and cover design
- Lemco Studios, Lexington, Kentucky – recording location
