= Fingerprint (album) =

Studio album by Mark Heard
- Released: 1980
- Recorded: Peace in the Valley Studios, Los Angeles, California
- Genre: Folk, rock
- Label: Palmfrond Communications
- Producer: Mark Heard

Mark Heard chronology
| Appalachian Melody (1979) | Fingerprint (1980) | Stop the Dominoes (1981) |

Professional ratings
Review scores
| Source | Rating |
|---|---|
| AllMusic | 2/5 stars |

Original Cover of "Fingerprint"

Fingerprint is an album by Mark Heard, released in Europe in 1980 on Palmfrond Communications. Heard later named his record label, Fingerprint Records, and home studio, Fingerprint Recorders, after this album.

== Track listing ==
All songs written by Mark Heard

Side one

1. "I'm In Chains" – 3:39
2. "Nowadays" – 3:24
3. "One More Time" – 3:02
4. "Epistle" – 2:50
5. "Just the Same" – 3:19
6. "Well–worn Pages" – 2:51

Side two

1. "Intro" – 0:25
2. "Gimme Mine" – 3:23
3. "All the Sleepless Dreamers" – 3:29
4. "Negative Charge" – 3:56
5. "Brown-Eyed Sue" – 3:20
6. "Es Tut Mir Leid" – 1:55
7. "Remarks To Mr. McLuhan" – 2:04
8. "Threefold Amen" – 0:23

The band

- Mark Heard – acoustic and electric guitars, bass guitar, electric lead and slide guitars, mandolins, Moog, percussion, vocals, backing vocals
- Janet Sue Heard – additional backing vocals
- Peter Johnson – drums.
- Jon Linn – electric and acoustic lead and slide guitars.
- Tom Howard – piano, synthesizer

Production notes

- This is a homemade album for European release.
- Recorded at Peace in The Valley Studios, Los Angeles, California.
- Live concert taping by Kir, Basel, Switzerland, June 14, 1980.
- Photographs by Mark and Janet Sue Heard.
- Deutsche Übersetzung: Wolfgang Küng, Jean-Daniel v. Lerber.

"Thanks to Terry Laughlin for use of his studio and home, to Peter, Jon and Tom for dropping by, to Jean-Daniel and Hansruedi for Birchermuesli. Love to Larry and the Circle of Cynics, to John & Prisca & Ann and the Huemoz folks for encouragement, to Chuck for darkroom work and being Perefit, to the Russell Hall Stairwell Dreamers, and to Corliss Lamont wherever you are."
