= Thirst (Randy Stonehill album) =

Studio album by Randy Stonehill
- Released: 1998
- Studios: The Whitehouse; The Carport; Buya; Soundstage Studios
- Genres: Folk, rock
- Label: Brentwood
- Producer: Rick Elias

Randy Stonehill chronology
Lazarus Heart (1994)	Thirst (1998)	Edge of the World (2002)

Professional ratings
Review scores
Source	Rating
Cross Rhythms	10/10 squares
The Phantom Tollbooth	5/5 stars

Thirst is an album by Randy Stonehill, released in 1998 on Brentwood Music.

== Track listing ==
All songs written by Randy Stonehill, except "Fire", written by Randy Stonehill and Jimmy Abegg; "Sleeping", written by Randy Stonehill and Phil Madeira; and "Little Rose", and "Everything You Know (Is Incorrect)" written by Randy Stonehill and David Edwards.

Side one

1. "Hand of God" – 4:15
2. "Fire" – 5:52
3. "Sleeping" – 4:11
4. "Father of Lights" – 4:11
5. "Angels' Wings" – 5:24

Side two

1. "Baby Hates Clowns" – 4:03
2. "Every Heartbeat Is A Prayer" – 5:03
3. "Lonely House" – 3:32
4. "Little Rose" – 5:17
5. "Everything You Know (Is Incorrect)" – 3:23
6. "Keeper of the Bear (CD-only track) – 2:29

== Personnel ==
- Randy Stonehill – vocals, guitars
- Tom Howard – acoustic piano, string arrangements, backing vocals
- Phil Madeira – Hammond B3 organ, accordion
- Stuart Adamson – guitars (1)
- Rick Elias – guitars, backing vocals
- Jerry McPherson – guitars, Indian lap dulcimer, banjo, portachord
- Jackie Street – bass
- Matt Pierson – bass
- Chris McHugh – drums
- Bob Sale – drums
- Russ Long – percussion
- Tammy Rogers – violin
- The Nashville String Machine – strings
- Linda Elias – backing vocals

== Production ==
- Rick Elias – producer
- Dean Diehl – executive producer
- Ray Ware – executive producer
- Recorded at The White House, The Carport, Buya Studio and Sound Stage Studios (Nashville, Tennessee).
- Russ Long – engineer
- Gregg Jampol – additional engineer
- Chris Grainger – assistant engineer
- Tara Wilson – assistant engineer
- J.R. McNeely – mixing at The Sound Kitchen (Franklin, Tennessee)
- Todd Gunnerson – mix assistant
- Mat5t (Matt Weeks) – mix assistant
- Hank Williams – mastering at MasterMix (Nashville, Tennessee)
- Spectrasonics – loops
- Jimmy Abegg – art direction
- Scott Hughes – art direction
- Shawn Stewart – design for Provident Music Group
- Ben Pearson – photography
