= Stop the Dominoes =

Studio album by Mark Heard
- Released: 1981
- Studio: Poiema Studios, Camarillo, California; The Gold Mine, Los Angeles
- Genre: Folk/rock
- Label: Home Sweet Home
- Producer: Mark Heard

Mark Heard chronology
Fingerprint (1980)	Stop the Dominoes (1981)	Victims of the Age (1982)

Professional ratings
Review scores
Source	Rating
AllMusic	3/5 stars

Stop the Dominoes is an album by Mark Heard, released in 1981 on Home Sweet Home Records.

== Track listing ==
All songs written by Mark Heard.

Side one

1. "One Of the Dominoes" - 3:11
2. "Stranded At the Station" - 3:54
3. "You Could Lie To Me" - 2:55
4. "One Night Stand" - 3:31
5. "I'm Crying Again" - 4:43

Side two

1. "Stuck In the Middle" - 3:13
2. "Call Me the Fool" - 3:28
3. "I'm In Chains" - 4:39
4. "Lonely One" - 3:37
5. "To See Your Face" - 4:26

== Personnel ==
The band

- Mark Heard - electric guitars, electric lead and slide guitars, keyboards
- Keith Edwards - drums
- John Patitucci - bass guitar
- Tom Howard - keyboards
- Tony Eisenbarger - electric guitars
- Alex MacDougall - percussion
- Mark Heard, Larry Norman, Randy Stonehill, Leslie Phillips, Little Bobby Emmons, Dave de Coup Crank - backing vocals

Additional musicians

- Sonny Garrish - pedal steel guitar
- Buddy Spicher - fiddle
- Karl Denson - saxophone

Production

- Produced, written and arranged by Mark Heard
- Primary engineer: Jonathan David Brown
- Additional engineers: Mark Heard, Janet Sue Heard
- Recorded February–March, 1981 at Poiema Studios, Camarillo, California and at The Gold Mine, Los Angeles, California
- Mixed by Mark Heard at The Gold Mine, Nashville, Tennessee
- Album design by Mark Heard
- Photographs by Janet Sue Heard
- Graphics director: Dave de Coup Crank

"Special thanks to Jonathan, Tammy and Nathan for tacos and locos, to Larry and Randy for awesome rockolla, to Bill and Marsha for homestead and avocado fans, to Chris and Shanon for talking Southern, to Leo Fender for Stratification, to David and Christy for Monday nights, to Dave for A and B bath, stop and hypo."

"Love to the Circle of Cynics. to Jean-Daniel und Hansruedi in Zürich, to Freddie in London, to John and Prisca and the Huemoz folks, to Mita Perefit and Sandra, to the Russell Hall Stairwell Dreamers and to my folks. Additional Thanks to Bill Deaton."

== Personnel ==
The band

- Mark Heard – electric guitars, electric lead and slide guitars, keyboards, backing vocals
- Keith Edwards – drums
- John Patitucci – bass guitar
- Tom Howard – keyboards
- Tony Eisenbarger – electric guitars
- Alex MacDougall – percussion
- Larry Norman – backing vocals
- Randy Stonehill – backing vocals
- Leslie Phillips – backing vocals
- Little Bobby Emmons – backing vocals
- Dave de Coup Crank – backing vocals

Additional musicians

- Sonny Garrish – pedal steel guitar
- Buddy Spicher – fiddle
- Karl Denson – saxophone

Production

- Mark Heard – producer, additional engineer, arranging, album design, mixing at The Gold Mine, Nashville, Tennessee
- Jonathan David Brown – primary engineer
- Janet Sue Heard – additional engineer, photography
- Recorded February–March, 1981 at Poiema Studios, Camarillo, California and at The Gold Mine, Los Angeles, California
- Dave de Coup Crank – graphics director
