= Dan Russell (artist manager) =

American musician

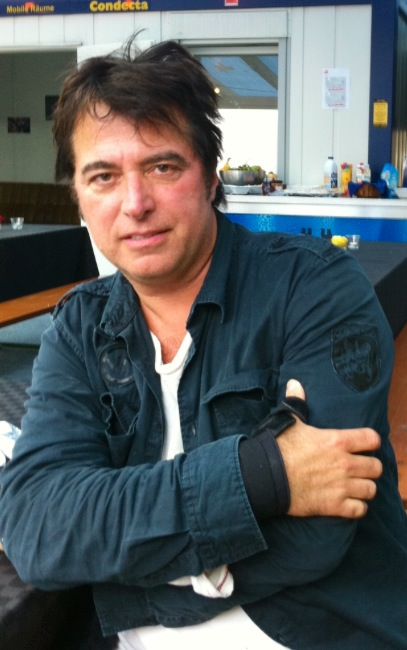
- Occupation(s): Artist, singer songwriter, artist advocate, producer, concert and event promoter

Dan Russell is an artist, singer songwriter, artist advocate, producer & concert and event promoter. A graduate of Walpole High School in Massachusetts and later Barrington College, Russell is known for managing both the American rock band the Call and songwriter Michael Been and has worked in various capacities with such artists as Black Rebel Motorcycle Club, Sam Philips, Mark Heard, U2 and Brad Corrigan, Cheryl Kelley, Robin Lane, Ramona Silver, Vigilantes of Love, Rachel Taylor, among others.

Russell is the president of New Sound Artist Management and NewSound International and the co-founder (along with the late Mark Heard and Chuck Long) of record label Fingerprint Records. In 1994 he received a Grammy nomination for producing Fingerprint's compilation album Strong Hand of Love: A Tribute to Mark Heard, to which he also contributed the song, "I Just Wanna Get Warm." After years of contributing to the careers of other artists, Russell recorded his debut album, Feel the Echoes, which was successfully funded via Kickstarter, and currently working on a new release for 2022.

In 1998, Russell founded the Soulfest, a multi-day music festival with core focus on faith and social justice. It was originally held at Loon Mountain in Lincoln, New Hampshire. Russell has been continuing his work on the festival, held every summer at the Franklin County Fairgrounds, Greenfield, Massachusetts, drawing more than 25,000 attendees annually to see over 100 bands, renowned authors and speakers on four stages.

Russell produces concert films and has expanded into music supervision for film and television, and he co-owns a music recording studio with his son Jesse Russell.

== Career ==
On February 1, 2024, it was announced that Dan Russell had signed with MI5 Records and Universal Music Group. This deal effectively revived Fingerprint Records, providing worldwide distribution and marketing support for Russell's music. Following the limited release of Dan Russell's 2017 record, Feel The Echoes, the album was remixed, resequenced, remastered, and retitled to Echoes at the request of the new label. Universal Music Group treated Echoes as a new release, with an official release scheduled for June 9, 2024. Available on all digital platforms: Echoes on Spotify.

Echoes achieved significant success on national rock radio charts. The album maintained a position in the top 20 of the national rock radio chart for 24 consecutive weeks. During this period, it reached an estimated 1.6 million listeners weekly and received more than 1,250 spins per week on rock radio stations nationwide.

== SoulFest ==
In 1998 Dan Russell founded and spearheaded the organization of the Soulfest, a multi-day music festival with core focus on faith and social justice. At first held at Loon Mountain in Lincoln, New Hampshire. The 3 day festival began at Loon Mountain in Lincoln, New Hampshire and changed locations in 2005 to Gunstock Mountain Resort in Gilford, NH. The festival featured such christian music outlets as Skillet, TobyMac, Third Day, Switchfoot, Kardia, The Chariot, Flyleaf, Jason Upton, Maeve, and Matt Maher.

At the conclusion of SoulFest 2022, organizers announced that SoulFest would relocate to the D.L. Moody Center in Northfield, Massachusetts. According to Gunstock Area Commission meeting minutes, Gunstock management sought early termination of its contract with SoulFest on the grounds that the event (which had grown to over 10,000 attendees per day, and as much as 25,000 per year) was not profitable for the resort and required significant resources, maxing out parking and campsite capacity in 2022. Festival founder Dan Russell stated "they just didn't want us back." Organizers moved ahead with advertising and selling tickets for Northfield SoulFest (proposed August 3–5, 2023), although the event had not received event permit approval from the Town of Northfield Selectboard as late as December 2022. In discussions with the town representatives of Northfield, the Moody Center proposed an event attendance of 8,500 for the first Northfield SoulFest. Local residents have raised concerns that the Town of Northfield (pop. 2866 in 2020), the Moody Center itself (a former preparatory school), and the local area all lack the infrastructure to host a large regional event.

27th Annual SoulFest would be held in August 2025, taking place in Franklin County Fairgrounds, Greenfield, Massachusetts.

== Partial discography ==
This is a partial list of recordings on which Dan Russell has played a role.

- Fun in the First World – Andy Pratt (Enzone Records, 1982) – Executive Producer, Manager
- Not Just for Dancing – Andy Pratt (Lamborghini Records, 1983) – Executive Producer, Manager
- Heart Connection – Robin Lane & the Chartbusters (Indie, 1984) – Executive Producer, Manager
- Between the Answers – John Fischer (Myrrh Records, 1985) – Producer, Arranger (with Victor LeComer)
- Casual Crimes – John Fischer (Myrrh Records, 1986) – Producer, Arranger (with Victor LeComer)
- Tribal Opera – iDEoLA (What? Records, A&M/Myrrh, 1987) – National Marketing Director
- The Indescribable Wow – Sam Phillips (Virgin Records, 1988) – Tour Manager
- Let the Day Begin – the Call (MCA Records, 1989) – Tour Manager, co-Manager
- Red Moon – the Call (MCA Records, 1990) – Associate Producer, Manager
- Jugular – Vigilantes of Love (Fingerprint Records, 1990) – Executive Producer
- Dry Bones Dance – Mark Heard (Fingerprint Records, 1990) – Associate Producer
- Second Hand – Mark Heard (Fingerprint Records, 1991) – Production Associate
- Cruel Inventions – Sam Phillips (Virgin Records, 1991) – Tour Manager
- The Embarrassing Young – John Austin (Glasshouse Records, 1991) – Executive Producer
- Killing Floor – Vigilantes of Love (Fingerprint Records, 1992) – Executive Producer
- Satellite Sky – Mark Heard (Fingerprint Records, 1992) – Co-Producer with Jim Scott
- High Noon – Mark Heard (Myrrh Records, 1993) – Producer
- Love Is Everywhere Maxi Single – The Call (Fingerprint Records, 1994) – Co-Producer
- Welcome to Struggleville – Vigilantes of Love (Capricorn Records, 1994) – Co-producer with Jim Scott
- Strong Hand of Love: A Tribute to Mark Heard (Fingerprint, Epic and Myrrh Records, 1994) – Producer
- The Magic Brain of Unreason – Hezze (Fingerprint Records, 1995) – Executive Producer
- You & Me & Hell – Ramona Silver (Fingerprint Records, 1995) – Executive Producer, Manager
- Blister Soul – Vigilantes of Love (Capricorn Records, 1995) – Co-Producer
- V.O.L. – Vigilantes of Love (WEA, 1996) – Producer
- Orphans of God – Mark Heard Tribute Album (Fingerprint Records, 1996) – Producer
- Trailers – Ramona Silver (Fingerprint Records, 1996) – Executive Producer, Manager
- Slow Dark Train – Vigilantes of Love (Capricorn Records, 1997) – Co-Producer
- The Best of The Call – the Call (Warner Brothers, 1997) – Producer
- To Heaven and Back – the Call (Fingerprint Records, 1997) – Executive Producer
- Ultrasound – Ramona Silver (Fingerprint Records, 1998) – Executive Producer, Manager
- Mystery Mind – Mark Heard (Fingerprint Records, 2000) Producer
- Live Under the Red Moon – the Call (Conspiracy Records, 2000) – Executive Producer
- Death By Candy – Ramona Silver (Fingerprint Records, 2001) – Executive Producer, Manager
- Fan Dance – Sam Phillips (Nonesuch Records, 2001) – Manager
- B.R.M.C. – Black Rebel Motorcycle Club (Virgin Records, 2001) – Co-Manager with Graeme Lowe
- Hammers and Nails – Mark Heard (Paste Music, 2003) – Co-Producer with Buddy Miller
- Take Them On, On Your Own – Black Rebel Motorcycle Club (Virgin Records, 2003) – Co-Manager with Graeme Lowe
- A Boot and a Shoe – Sam Phillips (Nonesuch Records, 2004) – Manager
- Howl – Black Rebel Motorcycle Club (RCA and ECHO, 2005), Manager
- The Howl sessions EP – Black Rebel Motorcycle Club (RCA and ECHO, 2006) – Manager
- BABY 81 – Black Rebel Motorcycle Club (RCA and Island Records, 2007) – Manager
- American X: Baby 81 Sessions EP – Black Rebel Motorcycle Club (RCA, 2007) – Manager
- The Effects of 333 – Black Rebel Motorcycle Club (Abstract Dragon, 2008) – Manager
- Don't Do Anything – Sam Phillips (Nonesuch Records, 2008) – Manager
- Beat the Devil's Tattoo – Black Rebel Motorcycle Club (Vagrant Records and Cooperative Music Group, 2010) – Manager
- Big Kettle Drum – Big Kettle Drum (BKD Records, 2012) – Executive Producer, Manager
- Heartbreak Is For Everyone – Rachel Taylor (Taylor Records, 2012) Co-Producer, Co-writer ("Broken"), Manager
- Specter at the Feast – Black Rebel Motorcycle Club (Vagrant Records and Co-Op/Pias, 2013) – Manager
- A Tribute to Michael Been – the Call featuring Robert Levon Bean (Label Records, 2014) – Producer with Robert Been and the Call.
- Feel the Echoes – Dan Russell (Fingerprint Records, 2017) - Artist
- Remastered re-release of Mark Heard's 1990 Fingerprint release of Dry Bones Dance (2022)
- Echoes, worldwide June 9, 2024 release on Fingerprint Records via MI5/UMG records. Remixed, remastered, resequenced version of 2017 Feel The Echoes. Produced by Jesse Mark Russell, Mixed and remastered by Free Hallas.

== Filmography ==
- Strong Hand of Love (1994) – producer
- Black Rebel Motorcycle Club Live (2009)- producer
- Black Rebel Motorcycle Club: Live in London (2010) – producer
- The Call Live at the Troubadour: A Tribute to Michael Been (2014) – producer

== Awards and nominations ==
- 1994 – Best Rock Gospel Album (nominated) – Strong Hand of Love
