= Dry Bones Dance =

Studio album by Mark Heard
- Released: 1990
- Studio: Fingerprint Recorders, Los Angeles, California
- Genre: Folk, rock
- Label: Fingerprint
- Producer: Mark Heard

Mark Heard chronology
Tribal Opera (1987)	Dry Bones Dance (1990)	Second Hand (1991)

Professional ratings
Review scores
Source	Rating
AllMusic	4.5/5 stars
Jesus Freak Hideout	5/5 stars

Dry Bones Dance is an album by Mark Heard, released in 1990, the first to be released on his own Fingerprint Records. The album was listed at No. 29 in CCM Presents: The 100 Greatest Albums in Christian Music.

== Track listing ==
All songs written by Mark Heard.

1. "Rise From The Ruins" – 3:03
2. "The Dry Bones Dance" – 3:48
3. "House of Broken Dreams" – 4:13
4. "Our Restless Hearts" – 3:43
5. "Nobody's Looking" – 3:26
6. "All She Wanted Was Love" – 4:20
7. "Strong Hand of Love" – 3:05
8. "How Many Tears" – 3:01
9. "Lonely Road" – 4:12
10. "Waiting for a Reason" – 3:31
11. "Everything Is Alright" – 4:24
12. "Awake in the Night Time" – 3:30
13. "Mercy of the Flame" – 4:24
14. "Fire" – 7:13

== Personnel ==
- Mark Heard – acoustic and electric guitar, vocals, accordion, harmonica, kalimba, assorted background vocals
- David Birmingham – drums
- Fergus Marsh – chapman stick
- Byron Berline – fiddle, mandolin
- Michael Been – guitar solo on "Lonely Road"
- Novi – viola
- Doug Berch – hammered dulcimer
- Sam Phillips – vocals (3, 4, 5, 12)
- Pam Dwinell – vocals (1, 2, 7, 9)
- Jerry Chamberlain and Sharon McCall – vocals (11, 13, 14)

Production notes

- Mark Heard – producer, engineer, mixing at Fingerprint Recorders
- Dan Russell – associate producer
- Chuck Long – executive-at-large
- Joel Russell – wagonmaster
- Joel Russell – second engineer
- Richard Tiegen – second engineer
- Dan Reed – second engineer
- David Miner – second engineer
- Tom Willett – second engineer, occasional back-seat driving
- Plum Studios, Newburyport, Massachusetts – basic track recording studio
