= Ashes and Light =

Studio album by Mark Heard
- Released: 1984
- Studio: Fingerprint Recorders, Montrose, California
- Genre: Folk rock
- Label: Home Sweet Home
- Producer: Mark Heard

Mark Heard chronology
Eye of the Storm (1984)	Ashes and Light (1984)	Mosaics (1985)

Professional ratings
Review scores
Source	Rating
AllMusic	3/5 stars

Ashes and Light is an album by Mark Heard, released in 1984 on Home Sweet Home Records. According to the liner notes, Heard recorded Mosaics first, but the record company wanted this album released first.

The cover reads, "This album is dedicated to the memory of Francis A. Schaeffer, whose love for truth and whose understanding of the arts has helped me more than I can say, in my desire to interweave the two."

== Track listing ==
All songs written by Mark Heard, except "Threw It Away" written by Mark Heard and Pat Terry.

Side one

1. "The Winds Of Time" – 3:59
2. "True Confessions" – 3:31
3. "I Know What It's Like To Be Loved" – 3:38
4. "Washed to the Sea" – 3:23
5. "We Believe So Well" – 3:34

Side two

1. "Straw Men" – 4:01
2. "Age of the Broken Heart" – 4:16
3. "Can't See Light" – 4:59
4. "Threw It Away" – 4:06
5. "In Spite of Himself" – 3:09

== Personnel ==
The band

- Mark Heard – acoustic guitars, electric 6- and 12-string guitars, slide guitars, synthesizer on "True Confessions", bass guitar on "Washed to the Sea" and "Threw It Away", harmonica, accordion, vocals, backing vocals
- Dave McSparran – drums
- Bill Batstone – bass guitar
- Carl Pickhardt – Hammond organ
- David Mansfield – fiddle, dobro, lead guitar on "Age Of The Broken Heart"
- Pat Terry – electric guitar on "Washed to the Sea", acoustic guitar on "Threw It Away"; synthesizer on "Straw Men", "We Believe So Well" and "In Spite of Himself", general camaraderie and comic relief
- Tom Howard – synthesizer on "Can't See Light", "I Know What It's Like To Be Loved" and "We Believe So Well"
- Harry Stinson – percussion
- Dave de Coup-Crank – backing vocals
- Dori Howard – backing vocals

Production notes

- Mark Heard – producer, engineer, mixing at Fingerprint Recorders, Montrose, California, arranger, cover concept
- Dan Reed – assistant engineer on basic tracks
- Mylo Carter – punch-ins
- Janet Heard – punch-ins
- Pat Terry – punch-ins
- Tim Alderson – punch-ins
- Dave de Coup-Crank – punch-ins
- Stewart Ivester – cover photography, artwork, cover concept
- Tim Alderson – art director
