= Second Hand (album) =

Studio album by Mark Heard
- Released: 1991
- Studio: Fingerprint Recorders, Los Angeles, California
- Genre: Folk, rock
- Label: Fingerprint
- Producer: Mark Heard

Mark Heard chronology
Dry Bones Dance (1990)	Second Hand (1991)	Satellite Sky (1992)

Professional ratings
Review scores
Source	Rating
AllMusic	4/5 stars

Second Hand is an album by Mark Heard, released in 1991, on Heard's own Fingerprint Records. The album was listed at No. 4 in the book CCM Presents: The 100 Greatest Albums in Christian Music.

At the 4th Annual Americana Music Association Honors & Awards at the Ryman Auditorium in September 2005, Buddy Miller received the Album of the Year Award for his Universal United House of Prayer, and the opening track of that album, a cover of Heard's "Worry Too Much" (originally released on this album), won the Song of the Year Award.

== Track listing ==
All songs written by Mark Heard, except where otherwise noted.

1. "Nod Over Coffee" – 4:38
2. "Lonely Moon" – 4:54
3. "Worry Too Much" – 4:13
4. "Look Over Your Shoulder" – 3:29
5. "She Don't Have a Clue" – 3:47
6. "Talking in Circles" – 4:05
7. "Love Is Not the Only Thing" – 4:58
8. "I Just Wanna Get Warm" – 3:53
9. "Another Good Lie" – 5:39
10. "All Too Soon" – 3:57
11. "It's Not Your Fault" – 3:23
12. "I'm Looking Through You" (John Lennon, Paul McCartney) – 3:40
13. "What Kind of a Friend" – 2:42
14. "The Ways of Men" (Steve Padgett) – 5:09

== Personnel ==
The band

- Steve Hindalong – drums
- David Raven – drums
- Bill Batstone – acoustic bass guitar, electric bass guitar
- Glen Holmen – standup bass, electric bass guitar
- Fergus Jemison Marsh – Chapman stick
- Mark Heard – acoustic and electric guitars, Hammond organ, vocals, accordion, mandolin, harmonica
- Pam Dwinell-Miner – backing vocals
- Greg Leisz – pedal steel guitar, dobro
- David Baker – percussion
- Doug Atwell – fiddle

Production notes

- Mark Heard – producer, engineer, mixing at Fingerprint Recorders, artwork, packaging
- Neverland Studios – drum recording location
- Dan Russell – production associate
- Chuck Long – executive producer
- Joel Russell – Face photography
- Eddy Schreyer – digital mastering at Future Disc Systems
