= Eye of the Storm (Mark Heard album) =

Studio album by Mark Heard
- Released: 1983
- Recorded: 1982
- Studio: The Gold Mine, Los Angeles, California
- Genre: Folk, rock
- Label: Home Sweet Home
- Producer: Mark Heard

Mark Heard chronology
Victims of the Age (1982)	Eye of the Storm (1983)	Ashes and Light (1984)

Eye of the Storm is an album by Mark Heard, released in 1983 on Home Sweet Home Records. According to the liner notes: "This album is a special, one-time release of acoustic guitar-oriented material. It is homemade. It was recorded on 24 track equipment one instrument at a time."

== Track listing ==
All songs written by Mark Heard.

Side one

1. "Eye of the Storm" – 3:02
2. "The Pain That Plagues Creation" – 3:59
3. "Castaway" – 3:18
4. "Well-worn Pages" – 2:45
5. "He Will Listen To You" – 3:00

=== Side two ===
1. "In the Gaze Of the Spotlight's Eye" – 3:59
2. "Gimme Mine" – 3:32
3. "These Plastic Halos" – 3:03
4. "No One But You" – 2:29
5. "Moonflower" – 2:26

== The band ==
- Mark Heard – Linn drums, bass guitar, acoustic guitars, electric guitars, lead and slide guitars, accordion, mandolin, harmonica, xylophone, percussion, voicehorns, voicestrings

Additional musicians

- Tom Howard – emulator, Fender Rhodes, synthesizer
- Phil Madeira – synthesizer, Fender Rhodes, eruma
- Al Perkins – pedal steel guitar
- Brandon Fields – saxophone
- Harry Stinson – tambourine, shaker, toothbrush, bowling pins
- Mark Heard
- Dave de Coup-Crank – backing vocals

Production notes

- Mark Heard – producer, arranger, engineer, mixing, cover design, photographer
- Recorded July–September 1982 at the Gold Mine, Los Angeles, California
- Janet Heard – assistant engineer, photographer
- Tim Alderson – cover design, art director
- Sally Jo Withrow – hand-lettering
- Steve Hall – mastering at Future Disc
- Wally Grant – mastering assistant

"Love to the Circle of Cynics, Pat and Pam Terry and the Strat Brothers, the Perefits, my friends at L'Abri and in Zurich and Stockholm, and my folks."
