= Tribal Opera =

Studio album by iDEoLA
- Released: 1987
- Studio: Fingerprint Recorders, Los Angeles, California
- Genre: Rock
- Label: What?/A&M
- Producer: Mark Heard

IDEoLA chronology
| Mosaics (1985) | Tribal Opera (1987) | Dry Bones Dance (1990) |

Professional ratings
Review scores
| Source | Rating |
|---|---|
| AllMusic | 3/5 stars |

Tribal Opera is an album by Mark Heard (using the pseudonym iDEoLA), released in 1987 on What? Records. It is a full-on solo project, put together by Heard in his home studio using samples and acoustic, electric and electronic instruments. The band name iDEoLA has no particular meaning; of it Heard said, "It's not supposed to be mysterious or anything; I just put a band together and right now I happen to be the only one in it." The album was a big departure step away from the country/folk-rock atmosphere of much of Heard's prior and subsequent music.

Both Rich Mullins and Olivia Newton-John later covered "How to Grow Up Big and Strong" on their own albums. Americana artist John Austin covered "Go Ask the Dead Man".

== Track listing ==
All songs written by Mark Heard.

Side one

1. "I Am An Emotional Man" – 4:30
2. "Is It Any Wonder" – 3:49
3. "Watching the Ship Go Down" – 3:53
4. "Talk To Me" – 3:49
5. "Go Ask the Dead Man" – 3:52

Side two

1. "Love Is Bigger Than Life" – 3:37
2. "How to Grow Up Big and Strong" – 5:07
3. "Everybody Dances" – 4:07
4. "Why Can't We Just Say No" – 4:24
5. "Hold Back Your Tears" – 3:47

== Personnel ==
The band

- iDEoLA – all instruments and vocals

Additional musicians People who hit things for digital samples at Fingerprint Recorders: Doug Mathews, David McSparran, Steve Hindalong, David Baker (who also played the Wengi Drum introduction for "Talk To Me") and Dan Michaels

Production notes

- Produced and recorded by Mark Heard at Fingerprint Recorders, Los Angeles, California
- Mixed digitally by Mark Heard at Can Am Recorders, Tarzana, California
- Assistants: Stan Katayama, Dan Reed and, Jim Dineen
- PCM 1630 editing at Digital Magnetics by Ted Hall
- Digital mastering at Futuredisc by Steve Hall
- Slaves prepared at Hollywood Sound
- Cover design and graphic arts: Tim Alderson
- Back cover photo-art by Stewart ivester
- Front cover optical textures by Andrew Doucene
