= Between the Glory and the Flame =

Studio album by Randy Stonehill
- Released: 1981
- Recorded: Whitefield Studios
- Genre: Christian rock
- Label: Myrrh
- Producer: Terry Scott Taylor

Randy Stonehill chronology
The Sky is Falling (1980)	Between the Glory and the Flame (1981)	Equator (1983)

Professional ratings
Review scores
Source	Rating
AllMusic	3/5 stars

Between the Glory and the Flame is an album by Randy Stonehill, released in 1981, on Myrrh Records.

== Track listing ==
All songs written by Randy Stonehill, except "Givin' It Up For Love" and "Farther On" which were written by Randy Stonehill and Tom Howard.

Side one

1. "Glory and the Flame" – 3:10
2. "Die Young" – 3:15
3. "Fifth Avenue Breakdown" – 2:50
4. "Grandfather's Song" – 3:24
5. "Find Your Way to Me" – 3:42

Side two

1. "Christine" – 3:29
2. "Rainbow" – 3:49
3. "Givin' It Up for Love" – 4:13
4. "Letter to My Family" – 4:58
5. "Farther On" – 2:56

This album has not been released on CD.

== Personnel ==
- Randy Stonehill – lead vocals (1, 2, 3, 5, 7, 8, 9), backing vocals (1, 2, 3, 5, 7, 8), electric 12-string guitar (1), rhythm guitar (1, 2, 3, 7, 8), percussion (2), all vocals (4, 6, 10), lead guitar (3), guitars (5, 6, 9), acoustic guitar (10)
- Tom Howard – backing vocals (3, 5, 7), acoustic piano (4), harmonium (4), string arrangements (4, 9), synthesizers (7), acoustic guitar (10)

with Daniel Amos

- Jerry Chamberlain – lead guitar (1, 2, 3, 8), backing vocals (1, 2, 3, 5, 7, 8), rhythm guitar (3, 7, 8)
- Terry Scott Taylor – electric slide guitar (7)
- Marty Dieckmeyer – bass (1, 2, 3, 5, 7, 8, 10)
- Ed McTaggart – drums (1, 2, 3, 5, 7, 8, 10), percussion (2, 3, 7)
- Alex MacDougall – percussion (1, 5, 10)

== Production ==
- Terry Scott Taylor – producer (for "Rebel Base Productions")
- Thom Roy – engineer
- White Field Studios – recording and mixing location
- Frank Ordaz – painting and artwork
- Daniel Amos appears courtesy of ¡Alarma! Records
- Terry Jonsson – Newscaster on "Christine"
- The "Whisper People" – whispers on "Rainbow"
