= Appalachian Melody =

Studio album by Mark Heard
- Released: 1979
- Recorded: 1977–1979
- Genre: Folk, rock
- Label: Solid Rock
- Producer: Larry Norman

Mark Heard chronology
Mark Heard (1975)	Appalachian Melody (1979)	Fingerprint (1980)

Appalachian Melody is an album by Mark Heard, released in 1979 on Solid Rock Records.

== Track listing ==
All songs written by Mark Heard.

=== Side one ===
1. "On the Radio" - 3:41
2. "Castaway" - 3:30
3. "Bless My Soul" - 4:08
4. "Here I Am (Once Again)" - 4:41
5. "With the Setting Sun" - 1:47

=== Side two ===
1. "Appalachian Melody" - 4:25
2. "Happy Cornbread Anniversary" - 0:48
3. "Two Trusting Jesus" - 4:18
4. "Jonah's Song" - 5:30
5. "Sidewalk Soliloquy" - 3:22
6. "The Last Time" - 3:19
7. "The Saints" - 0:27

=== Compact disc bonus tracks ===
1. "Bless My Soul" (Demo) - 3:28
2. "Appalachian Melody" (Demo) - 4:02
3. "Happy Cornbread Anniversary" (Demo) - 0:34
4. "Two Trusting Jesus" (Demo) - 2:06
5. "Jonah's Song" (Demo) - 3:37
6. "The Saints" (Demo) - 0:46
7. "Saints Are Singin'" (Demo) - 2:25

== Personnel ==
The band

- Mark Heard – acoustic and electric guitars, piano, mandolin, hambone, vocals, harmonies, arranging, co-producer, mixing, photography, album artwork
- Larry Norman – background vocals, producer, arranger, photography, album artwork
- Randy Stonehill – background vocals
- Tom Howard – Fender Rhodes, orchestration
- Jon Linn – lead guitar
- Flim Johnson – bass guitar
- Peter Johnson – drums

Additional musicians

- Al Perkins – pedal steel guitar, dobro
- Chuck Long – electric and acoustic guitars, additional photography
- Alex MacDougall – percussion and congas
- Janet Sue Heard – harmony, additional photography
- Tom Howard String Ensemble conducted by Tom Howard

Production notes

- Recorded December 1977 through January 1979
- Horse and Sandwich and the Hooey Room – pre-production location
- Ken Suesov – engineer, mixing
- George Price – engineer
- John Rhys – engineer
- Skip Saylor – engineer
- Tom Seufert – engineer
- EXR Exciter System – mixing system
- Bernie Grundman – mastering
- A&M – mastering location
- David K. Hills – additional photography
