= What? Records =

- Parent company: Word Records
- Founded: 1986
- Status: Defunct
- Distributor: A&M Records
- Genre: Christian rock
- Country of origin: US

What? Records was a short-lived record label started by Word Records and A&M Records, intended to focus on creative and unusual rock and roll records with spiritual messages. The intention was to feature Christian Rock artists that "wouldn't be too obvious" about their faith. It was founded in 1986. Its first release was Tonio K.'s Romeo Unchained.

In the short time that the label existed, it released albums by Mark Heard (under the name of iDEoLA), Tonio K. (two albums, the second of which was produced by T-Bone Burnett), and Chagall Guevara's Dave Perkins.

== Discography ==
- Romeo Unchained - Tonio K., 1986
- Tribal Opera - iDEoLA, 1987
- The Innocence - Dave Perkins, 1987
- Notes from the Lost Civilization - Tonio K., 1988
- Iona - Iona, 1990

== See also ==
- List of record labels
