= The Lazarus Heart (album) =

Studio album by Randy Stonehill
- Released: 1994
- Recorded: The Bennett House; Franklin, Tennessee; The Green Room; Huntington Beach, California; The Board Room; Nashville, Tennessee; Omnisound; Nashville; Shakin' Studios; Franklin, TN; The Dugout; Nashville.
- Genre: Folk rock
- Label: Street Level Records
- Producer: Jimmie Lee Sloas

Randy Stonehill chronology
Stories (1993)	The Lazarus Heart (1994)	Thirst (1998)

The Lazarus Heart is an album by Randy Stonehill, released in 1994 through his label, Street Level Records.

== Track listing ==
All songs written by Randy Stonehill, except where noted.

No.	Title	Length
1.	"A Promise Made Is a Promise Kept"	5:46
2.	"I Turn to You"	3:28
3.	"In Jesus' Name"	4:27
4.	"Under the Rug"	3:39
5.	"Remember My Name"	4:56
6.	"That's Why We Don't Love God"	5:17
7.	"When I'm Afraid"	3:38
8.	"Shadow Man"	3:35
9.	"Zurich in the Snow"	0:19
10.	"Troubles"	3:22
11.	"The Lazarus Heart"	4:26
Total length:		48:53

== Personnel ==
- Randy Stonehill – lead and backing vocals, acoustic and Chet Atkins classical guitars
- Rick Elias – acoustic piano, keyboards and backing vocals
- Phil Madeira – electric organ, accordion, dobro and backing vocals
- Michael W. Smith – additional keyboards (3) and lead vocals (3)
- Jimmie Lee Sloas – Wurlitzer electric piano, bass guitar and backing vocals (2, 3, 5 and 6)
- Phil Keaggy – electric and lead guitars (4)
- Jerry McPherson – electric and acoustic guitars
- Mark Hill – fretless bass (10)
- Steve Brewster – drums
- Eric Darken – percussion
- Mark Douthit – soprano saxophone
- Bob Carlisle – backing vocals (1)
- Kim Fleming – backing vocals (1)
- Vicki Hampton – backing vocals (1)
- Christine Denté – harmony vocals (2)
- Gordon Kennedy – backing vocals (2, 3, 5 and 6)
- Jerry Chamberlain – backing vocals
- Sharon Chamberlain – backing vocals
- David Robertson – backing vocals
- Gary Chapman – backing vocals (8)
- Riki Michele – backing vocals (11)

== Production ==
- Ray Ware – executive producer
- Jimmie Lee Sloas – producer
- Richie Biggs – engineer, mixing (3, 6–8, 10, 11)
- Craig Hansen – mixing (1, 2, 4, 5, 9)
- Ken Love – mastering
- Pam Kistler – production assistant
- Chris Ross – production assistant
- Dietsch & Associates – cover art direction, design
- Michael Scanland Communications, Inc. – design, insert layout
- Thunder Image Group. – cover photography
- Rick Elias – wardrobe ... "well, okay, I swiped his jacket and vest - so sue me!"
- Dominique at Trumps Studio (Nashville, TN) – make-up
- H. Benyousky, M. Scanland & G. Morkel – key grips

Studios

- Recorded at The Bennett House and Shakin' Studios (Franklin, Tennessee); The Board Room, OmniSound and The Dugout (Nashville, Tennessee); The Green Room (Huntington Beach, California).
- Mixed at The Dugout and Charlie Peacock Studios (Nashville, Tennessee).
- Mastered at MasterMix (Nashville, Tennessee).
