= John Mehler =

American drummer

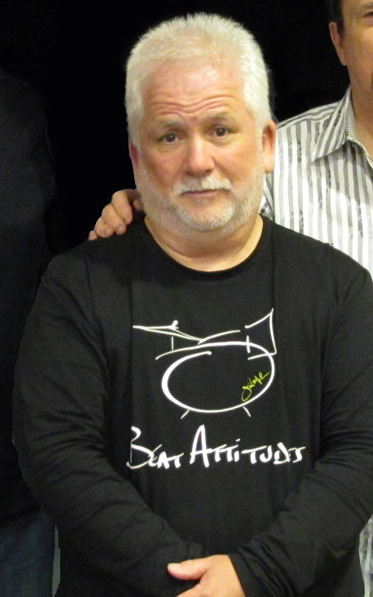
Mehler in 2010

John Mehler (born August 27, 1948, in Long Beach, California) is a drummer for Love Song, Spirit of Creation, Noah and other bands.

== Biography ==
Mehler graduated from Woodrow Wilson High School in 1969 and soon thereafter moved to Salt Lake City with two musician friends, Chuck Fraher and Jay Truax, to form Spirit of Creation. While Mehler was a member of Spirit of Creation the group opened for some of the more popular groups of the day including Three Dog Night, Spirit and the Grateful Dead. In the summer of 1970 he joined Chuck Girard and Tommy Coomes in Love Song, one of the pioneers of Contemporary Christian Music (CCM). Mehler has worked with artists as far ranging as Frank Sinatra, Dean Martin, Lee Ritenour, Richie Furay and Phil Keaggy.

Mehler's solo album Bow and Arrow was a pioneering work in the Contemporary Christian Music scene. The album is currently hard to find and is out of print.

CCM magazine says,

"John Mehler's musical contributions have graced the "fine print" of more Christian albums than just about anyone I can think of. As a member of Love Song (one of ccm's foundational bands), his distinct style as a drummer was to have as dramatic an influence on the sound of many early Christian bands as Ringo Starr did on the British bands that followed in the wake of the Beatles. As a session player on countless records, John brings to the drums a unique musicality thoroughly individual yet always complementary to the sound of the artists he's accompanying."
