= Kate Miner (musician) =

American singer and songwriter

Kate Miner (born Pamela Kate George) is an American singer and songwriter.

== Biography ==
Miner began singing publicly at the age of four in the San Diego area. At the age of ten, she was singing music for television commercials. By 21, Miner had moved to Los Angeles and was signed to a recording contract with Word Records, which included a co-publishing/development deal with Sony Music Publishing.

In the late 1980s, still known as Pam Dwinell, Miner toured with Phil Keaggy and Mark Heard. She went on to perform and record with artists like Tonio K, Pierce Pettis, Christopher Williams, Michele Pillar, Randy Stonehill, The Choir, and FunderburkMiner.

In 1992, Miner shared the stage with Heard during his final performance at the Cornerstone Festival. Heard had a heart attack and died the following month. Miner would go on to record a tribute to Heard for the albums Strong Hand of Love and Orphans of God. Also that year, she was named Female Acoustic Artist of the Year by the National Academy of Songwriters.

Through the community found in the Malibu Vineyard Christian Fellowship, Miner realized her true calling to pursue a career exclusively focusing on Christian worship music. Two years later, in 1995, Miner recorded her own album, Sacred, enlisting help from musicians including singer Julie Miller. Old Hymns My Mom Loves followed in 1999, a tribute to her mother, diagnosed with terminal brain cancer. Hymns featured, just as the name suggests, Miner's renditions of traditional hymns including How Great Thou Art and "It Is Well With My Soul." Also recorded that year was a live album, Live From The Sunset Strip, which found Miner performing at the Roxy in West Hollywood, California, backed by Walter Rodriguez, Ron Aniello, Derri Daugherty, Scott Docherty and David Miner.

From December 2001 to February 2003, Miner spent time in The Green Room in Huntington Beach, California, The Music Room in Woodland Hills, California, and The Homestead in Leipers Fork, Tennessee, recording a followup to Old Hyms My Mom Loves, this time appropriately entitled Old Hymns My Dad Loves. This time Miner was backed by Ramy Antoun, Troy Dexter, Danny Donnelly, Mike Holden, and Phil Madeira.

After being diagnosed with polyps on her vocal cords and the prospect of never singing again, Miner channeled her time of physical silence into the creation of a new record, Prodigal Martha, which was released in 2005. Of the record, Miner says, "[Prodigal Martha is] my return back to the stillness. Ironically, it's this hard driving rock record. But it starts in that really broken place. The chorus of the title track goes 'Father I know it's here. It's been so long since I’ve sat at your feet, will you recognize me?' It’s a great journey."

== Discography ==
- Strong Hand of Love, 1994
- Sacred, 1995
- Orphans of God, 1996
- Old Hymns My Mom Loves, 1999
- Live from the Strip, 1999
- These Could've Been My Greatest Hits, 2000
- Old Hymns My Dad Loves, 2001
- Making God Smile: An Artists' Tribute to the Songs of Beach Boy Brian Wilson, 2002
- Prodigal Martha, 2005
- Songs, 2009
