= Mark Heard =

American folk rock singer and songwriter (1951–1992)

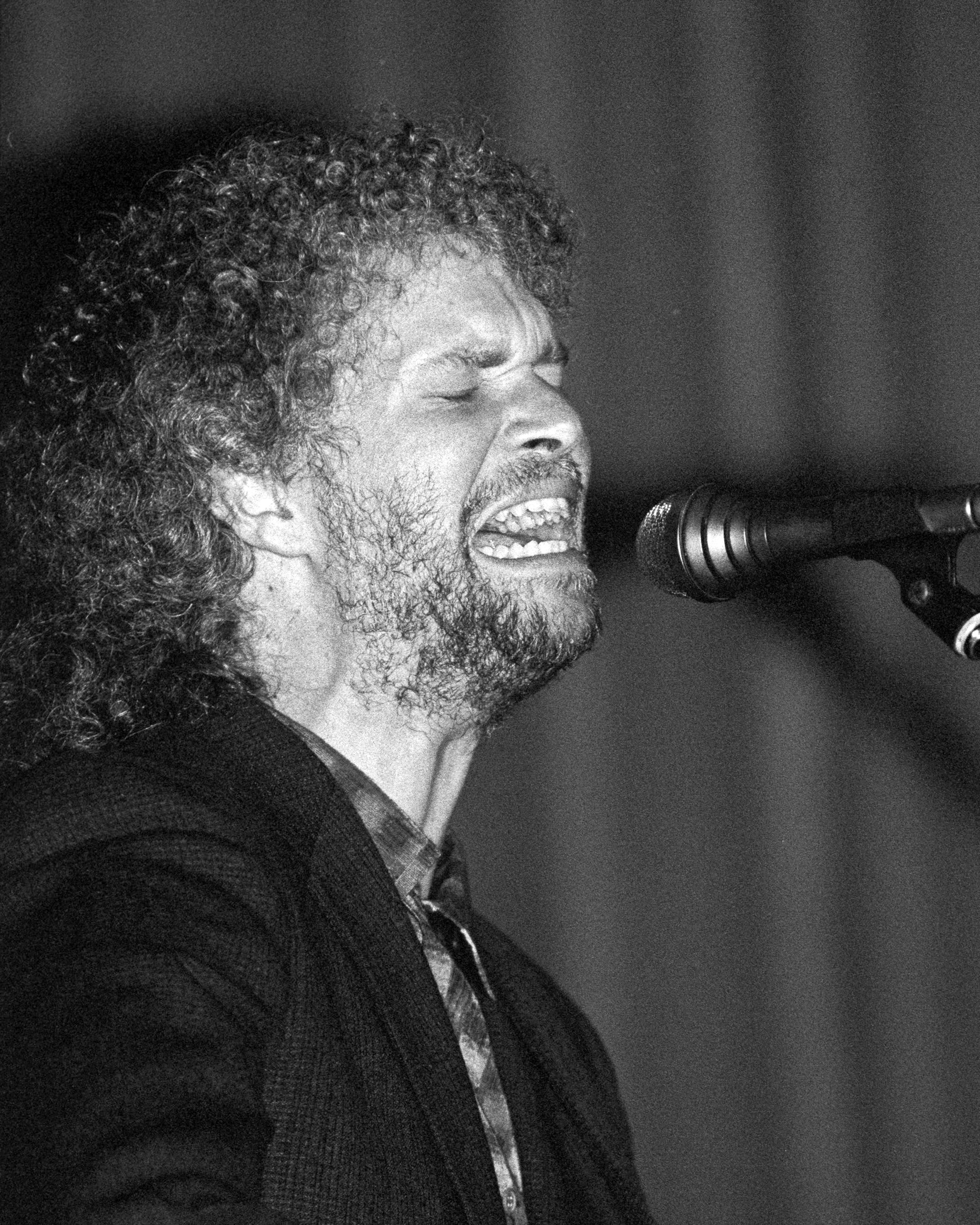
- Mark Heard performs in 1987

Background information
- Born: John Mark Heard III; December 16, 1951; Macon, Georgia, U.S.
- Died: August 16, 1992 (aged 40) Chicago, Illinois, U.S.
- Genre: Folk rock
- Occupations: Singer; songwriter; record producer
- Instruments: Vocals; guitar; mandolin
- Years active: 1970–1992
- Labels: Fingerprint; Solid Rock; Home Sweet Home; What?; Myrrh

John Mark Heard III (December 16, 1951 – August 16, 1992) was an American record producer, folk rock singer and songwriter from Macon, Georgia.

Heard released sixteen albums, and produced or performed with many artists, including: Sam Phillips (aka Leslie Phillips), Pierce Pettis, Phil Keaggy, Vigilantes of Love, Peter Buck of R.E.M. (who co-produced VOL's album Killing Floor with Heard), The Choir, Randy Stonehill and Michael Been of The Call. Heard produced part of Olivia Newton-John's The Rumour (1988), which also included a cover of Heard's own "Big and Strong" (originally called "How to Grow Up Big and Strong").

== Early life and music career ==
Heard's first appearance on record was with his early Jesus music band Infinity+3, who released the album Setting Yesterday Free in 1970. He went solo in 1972. After graduating from the University of Georgia in 1974 with an ABJ (bachelor of arts in journalism) degree in television, Heard traveled to Switzerland to study at L'Abri under the influential evangelical Christian philosopher Francis Schaeffer. Singers Larry Norman and Randy Stonehill stumbled onto Mark one day playing his guitar. Because Norman and Stonehill expressed interest, Heard spent most of his spare time the next two months putting together a demo tape in a local studio with the help of the Pat Terry group (Pat Terry, Sonny Lallerstedt and Randy Bugg). Norman was so impressed by Heard's abilities that he soon signed him to his record label, Solid Rock Records. In 1977, Heard and his wife Janet moved to Glendale, California. He begin working on his Appalachian Melody album for the label, but would also maintain a close relationship with the people at the L'Abri for years. In 1980, Heard recorded and released Fingerprint on a Swiss label.

In 1981, Heard began a recording contract with Chris Christian's Home Sweet Home Records. Although Heard's sales did not attract attention from the major Christian labels, Christian felt Mark's music was unique, fresh and deserved to be heard. Christian funded his projects with no production oversight, which is what Heard wanted. His signing to the label was a departure from the commercial artists that Christian traditionally signed and produced on the Home Sweet Home label. Heard released five albums for the label: 1981's Stop the Dominoes, 1982's Victims of the Age, 1983's Eye of the Storm, 1984's Ashes and Light and 1985's Mosaics. The overall experience was not one that Heard enjoyed, partly due to his personal experiences with record company executives, and partly due to compromises he felt under pressure to make himself so that his songs were more marketable to Christian audiences.

In 1984, Heard began recording in his home studio, which he dubbed "Fingerprint Recorders", after the title of one of his earlier records. From that point on, his albums were largely made at home, with just a handful of friends and relatives lending a hand. In 1986, Heard decided to try something a little different and recorded the experimental Pop/Rock album for What? Records entitled Tribal Opera, under the name iDEoLA. When asked about the unusual name, Heard replied "It's not supposed to be mysterious or anything; I just put a band together and right now I happen to be the only one in it." Heard also directed a music video for the single of that album, "Is It Any Wonder".

With assistance from Dan Russell and Chuck Long, Fingerprint Records and studio were born. Heard began to produce albums for a number of artists including two albums for Randy Stonehill, Jacob's Trouble, Pierce Pettis and 1992's Vigilantes of Love album, Killing Floor, which he co-produced with R.E.M.'s Peter Buck. Stonehill's Until We Have Wings includes a song co-written by Heard, "Faithful", although the CD liner notes credit the song to Heard's pseudonym, Giovanni Audiori. In 1988, Heard collaborated with Randy Stonehill and other well known artists on Phil Keaggy and Sunday's Child. In addition to writing and performing credits, he helped with the engineering.

Heard returned to recording albums of his own in the early 1990s, with Dry Bones Dance. Fans and reviewers alike hailed the new release as one of the best of his career. He followed Dry Bones Dance with Second Hand in 1991, and Satellite Sky in 1992, which would turn out to be his final release.

== Death ==
On July 4, 1992, Heard had a heart attack on stage while performing with Pierce Pettis and Kate Miner, at the Cornerstone Festival in Bushnell, IL, near Peoria. Heard finished his set and went to the hospital immediately afterwards. Two weeks after being released from the hospital, Heard went into cardiac arrest and died on August 16, 1992. Before Heard's death, he had been included on the Legacy II sampler from Windham Hill's High Street label, and was nearly finalizing a mainstream contract with Bruce Cockburn's label, True North Records in Canada. There was also interest from Sony's Columbia Records label for distribution in the US.

== Tributes and influence ==
In 1993, Rich Mullins covered "How to Grow Up Big and Strong" on his A Liturgy, a Legacy, & a Ragamuffin Band. In 1994, many artists came together to record a tribute album called Strong Hand of Love. Artists lending their talents to the project included Phil Keaggy, Randy Stonehill, Victoria Williams, Chagall Guevara, Buddy Miller, Julie Miller, Daniel Amos, The Choir and Bruce Cockburn. The project was later reissued as a double album set with additional tracks and re-titled Orphans of God. Cockburn frequently called Heard his favorite songwriter. He wrote and recorded a song dedicated to Heard for his Dart to the Heart album, "Closer to the Light". Daniel Amos dedicated their album MotorCycle to Heard in 1993, and The Swirling Eddies dedicated Zoom Daddy to Heard the same year. Julie Miller also wrote a song in tribute to Heard called "All My Tears" which has also been recorded by Jars of Clay, Emmylou Harris (studio and live versions) and Selah with Kim Hill on Bless the Broken Road: The Duets Album.

In 2000, a group of fans gathered together to help Fingerprint Records release Mystery Mind, the first collection of previously unreleased material from the songwriter. There were plans to release a full length collection that same year, but those plans never came to fruition.

In 2002, the Cornerstone Music Festival held a songwriting contest in honor of Heard. The following year, Paste magazine released Hammers and Nails, a CD of previously unreleased recordings by Heard. An authorized biography of the same name was also released by Cornerstone Press, written by Matthew T. Dickerson.

In September 2005, the Americana Music Association held its annual Americana Music Honors & Awards at the Ryman Auditorium in Nashville, Tennessee. The Song of the Year Award was presented to Mark Heard for "Worry Too Much", originally featured on Second Hand. Buddy Miller, who performed the track on Universal United House of Prayer, accepted the award on behalf of Heard. Miller also received the Album of the Year Award for Universal United House of Prayer.

In a June/July 2006 Paste magazine article (from the special collector's issue featuring the 100 Best Living Songwriters), Heard was remembered under the heading Wish You Were Here: "Mark Heard's lyrics are weighted with such a wry longing that they'll forever reflect a fresh turbulence."

Pierce Pettis and Ralston Bowles have covered a song by Mark Heard on each of their albums released since Heard's death.

In 2017, an 18-song retrospective, Mark Heard: Treasure of the Broken Land, was released. It focuses on Heard's last three albums and features Rodney Crowell, Buddy Miller, Over the Rhine and others. Produced by Phil Madeira (a member of Emmylou Harris' backing band Red Dirt Boys), the album received notable attention from Rolling Stone magazine, and Americana music magazine No Depression.

== Discography ==
=== Albums ===
- Setting Yesterday Free (1970)
- Mark Heard (1975) – reissued as On Turning To Dust (1978)
- Appalachian Melody (1979)
- Fingerprint (1980)
- Stop the Dominoes (1981)
- Victims of the Age (1982)
- Eye of the Storm (1983)
- Ashes and Light (1984)
- Mosaics (1985)
- The Best Of Mark Heard (1985)
- Tribal Opera (1987)
- Dry Bones Dance (1990)
- Second Hand (1991)
- Satellite Sky (1992)

=== Compilation albums ===
Home Sweet Home Records

- Acoustic: The Best of Mark Heard (1985)
- Reflections of a Former Life (1993)
- Greatest Hits (2000)

Fingerprint Records

- High Noon (1993)
- Mystery Mind (2000) – demos, live, and interviews
- Hammers and Nails (2003) – previously unreleased demos

Solid Rock Records

- The Lost Artifacts of an American Poet – The Original Recordings of Mark Heard (2007) – previously unreleased demos
- The Lost Artifacts of an American Poet – The Original Recordings of Mark Heard Part II (2008) – previously unreleased demos

=== Tribute albums ===
- Strong Hand of Love: A Tribute to Mark Heard (1994)
- Orphans of God: A Tribute to Mark Heard (1996)
- Treasure of the Broken Land: The Songs of Mark Heard (2017)

Awards
Preceded by Rodney Crowell	AMA Song of the Year (Songwriter); 2005	Succeeded by James McMurtry
