= Tonio K =

American singer-songwriter

- Born: Steven M. Krikorian; July 4, 1950 (age 75); United States
- Genres: Rock
- Occupation: Musician
- Years active: 1963–present

Tonio K. (born Steven M. Krikorian, July 4, 1950) is an American singer/songwriter who has released eight albums. His songs have been recorded by Al Green, Aaron Neville, Burt Bacharach, Bonnie Raitt, Chicago, Wynonna Judd and Vanessa Williams, among many others. His song "16 Tons of Monkeys", co-written with guitarist Steve Schiff, was featured in the 1992 Academy Award-winning short film Session Man. He worked with Bacharach and hip-hop impresario Dr. Dre on Bacharach's At This Time, which won the Grammy for Best Pop Instrumental Recording in 2005.

== Recording and performing artist ==
As a teenager, Krikorian, along with friends Alan Shapazian, Steve Olson, Nick van Maarth, and Duane Scott, formed a surf-funk/psychedelic-punk band called The Raik's Progress, which recorded a single for Liberty Records, released in 1966. Known for their Dadaist-inspired between-song routines, one reviewer described their performance while opening for Buffalo Springfield at San Francisco's Fillmore Auditorium as being like "the Three Stooges playing strip poker with Iggy and the Stooges". A full-length album by the band, Sewer Rat Love Chant, was eventually issued on Sundazed Records in 2003.

In the early 1970s, Krikorian recorded two albums with Buddy Holly's original band, The Crickets. The group consisted of founding members J.I. Allison and Sonny Curtis, plus Rick Grech (Blind Faith, Traffic) and Albert Lee (Heads, Hands and Feet, Eric Clapton) and the Raik's Nick van Maarth who would later join California rock ensemble Wha-Koo. Remnants (1973) and A Long Way from Lubbock (1974) were produced by long-time Holly and Cricket cohort, Bob Montgomery. In 2004, Krikorian reunited with the Crickets for a track on their star-studded (Eric Clapton, Graham Nash, Phil Everly) album, The Crickets and Their Buddies, singing lead on the Holly classic, "Not Fade Away".

In 1978, Krikorian went solo with Life in the Foodchain on Irving Azoff's Full Moon/Epic label. Adopting the moniker Tonio K., a reference to the writings of Kafka and Thomas Mann, he was hailed as America's answer to Britain's Angry Young Men (Elvis Costello, Joe Jackson, Graham Parker) and the "funniest serious songwriter in America". The record was produced by Rob Fraboni (The Band, Bob Dylan, Joe Cocker) and featured a supporting cast that included Earl Slick, Garth Hudson, Dick Dale and Albert Lee. It was also the first pop/rock record to feature the percussive sounds of an AK-47 firing live ammunition. The album debuted on L.A. radio station KROQ and garnered much critical acclaim. Steve Simels at Stereo Review proclaimed it "the greatest album ever recorded" which helped establish K. as an artist to watch.

K.'s follow-up album, Amerika, was released in 1980 via Clive Davis's Arista Records. Filled with literary and political references, the album was hailed as "punk for academics" and once again pronounced by Simels to be "the greatest record ever recorded" (as was every ensuing Tonio K. disc).

After a move to Capitol Records in 1982, K. recorded the five-song 12-inch EP La Bomba, a live-in-the-studio album produced by Carter (Motels, Tina Turner, Paula Cole). Recorded in Capitol Studio B, it featured K.'s touring band: George "Geo" Conner (guitar), Alfredo Acosta Alwag (drums), and Enrique “Eric” Gotthelf (bass). The song "Mars Needs Women" also appears on the EP.

Tonio next released Romeo Unchained on What?/A&M Records. Hailed by Rolling Stone magazine as "the best Bob Dylan album since Dylan himself lost interest in the pop song form", the album landed on numerous critics' top 10 albums of the year lists. Recorded during 1985 and 1986, it was produced, variously, by Rick Neigher, Bob Rose (Julian Lennon) and T Bone Burnett (Counting Crows, Wallflowers, Robert Plant & Alison Krauss). The musicians on these recordings included Neigher (on many instruments), Rose, Burnett, Peter Banks (Yes), David Mansfield, David Miner, David Raven, Tim Pierce, Tim Chandler, and Rob Watson. Notes from the Lost Civilization, again on What?/A&M, followed in 1988. It was concurrently released on the Word label, a gospel/Christian music subsidiary of A&M; the Word version of the release did not include the song "What Women Want"(presumably for the lyric "they want sex, yeah that's true" although the point of the song is that women want love). Produced by Tonio K. and David Miner, with T Bone Burnett serving as executive producer, the all-star cast of supporting musicians included Burnett, Booker T. Jones on Hammond B-3, Jim Keltner, Raymond Pounds and Alex Acuña on drums and percussion, James Jamerson, Jr. and David Miner on bass, and Charlie Sexton and Jack Sherman on additional guitars. The video for the single, "Without Love", marked Tonio's first airplay on MTV.

Olé was Tonio K.'s final record for A&M. Recorded in 1989 and 1990, it did not see release until 1997 on Gadfly Records. (The reasons for this are well documented in the liner notes to the CD.) It was produced by T Bone Burnett and David Miner with a core band consisting of Marc Ribot, Booker T. Jones, David Raven and Bruce Thomas (Attractions). Additional guitarists included Jack Sherman, Charlie Sexton, Rusty Anderson, Los Lobos' David Hidalgo and The Replacements' Paul Westerberg. Although Olé was K.'s last major label recording, several other compilation and live CDs have been issued (see discography below).

== Songwriter ==
Tonio K. continued as a performing singer/songwriter into the 1990s but gradually withdrew from live concerts and focused more on crafting songs with and for other artists. His biggest commercial success, "Love Is", was co-written with long-time collaborator John Keller, composer Michael Caruso and recorded by Vanessa Williams and Brian McKnight. It was a number-one Pop and AC (Adult Contemporary) radio single and one of the most-played songs of 1993. K. has publicly questioned the validity of Caruso's credit on the recording—though without using his name—and appears validated only by virtue of his refusing to name Caruso specifically and by not having given up any of his financial stake in the song, for which Keller apparently offered a percentage of his own to Caruso. (K. has been quoted as saying that his first choice for vocalist on the song was the famously gruff-voiced Tom Waits). He also co-wrote, with Bob Thiele, Jr. and John Shanks, the Bonnie Raitt AC hit, "You".

Tonio and close friend Charlie Sexton have written many (mostly unreleased) songs since Sexton first recorded K.'s "Impressed" and "You Don't Belong Here" on his debut album, Pictures for Pleasure, in 1985. "Graceland (Never Been To)", opening track to the Quentin Tarantino-written and Tony Scott-directed movie True Romance, is one of their more notable, albeit obscure, cuts. K. was involved in writing six songs on Sexton's Arc Angels debut on Geffen Records. He also co-wrote with Sexton for his Under the Wishing Tree release on MCA.

Tonio K. has written lyrics for both Steve Jones of the Sex Pistols and Burt Bacharach. In addition to several years of collaborating with Bacharach, Tonio co-wrote eight of the nine vocal tracks on the aforementioned Grammy-winning CD, At This Time.

Tonio K. film credits include "Nobody Lives Without Love", co-written with musician/writer/producer Larry Klein (Joni Mitchell, Herbie Hancock) and featured on the multi-platinum-selling soundtrack to Batman Forever; the quasi-disco semi-hit, "I'm Supposed to Have Sex with You", from the Carl Reiner film Summer School; "Stop the Clock", co-written with T Bone Burnett for the early Vince Vaughn/Joaquin Phoenix/Janeane Garofalo vehicle, Clay Pigeons; the above-mentioned "Graceland" from True Romance; his song "The Tuff Do What?" from 1985's movie Real Genius; and 2002's Van Wilder featuring Ryan Reynolds song called "Okay" written with the band Swirl 360.

Tonio K.'s first known "cover" was a song called "Hey John", recorded by Johnny Rivers in 1972, but never released. In addition to the cuts mentioned above, he has written with and for Brian Wilson, J.I. Allison, The Crickets, Al Green, Bette Midler, The Pointer Sisters, Tanya Tucker, Diane Schuur, Percy Sledge, Phoebe Snow, Jules Shear, The Runaways, Patty Smyth, Kenny Wayne Shepherd, and Italian superstar Richard Cocciante. Recent covers include songs by Irma Thomas ("What Can I Do?" co-written with Burt Bacharach) on her Rounder Records CD Simply Grand and several songs co-written with pedal steel prodigy Robert Randolph for his CD We Walk This Road, produced by T Bone Burnett.

Musician "Weird Al" Yankovic has called Tonio K. one of his "favorite artists".

== Discography ==
- Life in the Foodchain, (Full Moon/Epic, 1978)
- Amerika (Arista, 1980)
- La Bomba (Capitol/Universal Music, 1982)
- Romeo Unchained (What? Records/A&M, 1986)
- Notes from the Lost Civilization (What?/A&M, 1988)
- Olé (Gadfly, 1997)
- Rodent Weekend '76–'96 (Gadfly, 1998)
- Yugoslavia (Gadfly, 1999)
- 16 Tons of Monkeys, (Gadfly, 2001)

=== As band member ===
With The Raik's Progress

- Sewer Rat Love Chant (Sundazed, 2003)

With The Crickets

- Remnants (Vertigo, 1973)
- A Long Way from Lubbock (Mercury (UK-only release), 1974)

=== Compilation appearances ===
- "I'm Supposed to Have Sex with You" from the film Summer School (Chrysalis, 1987)
- "La Bomba" from The Best of La Bamba (Rhino, 1988)
- "The Funky Western Civilization" from New Wave Hits of the 80's (Rhino, 1994)
- "Another Day in Limbo" from Orphans of God: A Tribute to Mark Heard (1996)
- "Not Fade Away" (with Peter Case) from The Crickets and Their Buddies (Sovereign Artists, 2004)
