= What's So Amazing About Grace? =

Book by Philip Yancey

- First edition cover
- Author: Philip Yancey
- Working title: What's So Amazing About Grace and Why the World Needs More of It
- Language: English
- Subject: Grace in Christianity
- Genre: Christian devotional literature
- Published: 1997 (Zondervan)
- Publication place: United States
- Pages: 292
- ISBN: 978-0-310-21327-7
- OCLC: 427821
- Dewey Decimal: 234
- LC Class: BT761.2 .Y35 1997
- Preceded by: Finding God in Unexpected Places
- Followed by: The Bible Jesus Read
- Website: http://philipyancey.com/whats-so-amazing-about-grace

What's So Amazing About Grace? is a 1997 book by Philip Yancey, an American journalist and editor-at-large for Christianity Today. The book examines grace in Christianity, contending that people crave grace and that it is central to the gospel, but that many local churches ignore grace and instead seek to exterminate immorality. What's So Amazing About Grace? includes Bible stories, anecdotes from Yancey's life, accounts of historical events and other stories. These include a modern retelling of the Parable of the Prodigal Son, an account of Yancey's friendship with Mel White who came out as gay, a comparison of the teachings of early Christians Pelagius and Augustine of Hippo, and a summary of Karen Blixen's short story "Babette's Feast".

Yancey was inspired to write What's So Amazing About Grace? after President Bill Clinton asked him, "Why do Christians hate so much?" Although Yancey initially intended to call the book What's So Amazing About Grace: and Why Don't Christians Show More of It?, Zondervan, its publisher, objected to this title despite the author's contention that he wrote the book to communicate the belief that grace is one of the best quality Christians, like himself, have to offer but are not necessarily identified with it. The book was successful at secular and Christian stores, selling more than 15 million copies by 2006 and becoming Yancey's best-known book. In it, Yancey coined the phrase "scandal of grace", referring to the idea that God forgives some of the worst people, citing the conversion of Paul the Apostle.

What's So Amazing About Grace? was named Book of the Year by the Evangelical Christian Publishers Association in 1998. In 2006, it ranked 17th on Christianity Today's list of fifty books that have shaped Evangelicals the most. In a Publishers Weekly review, Henry Carrigan notes an anecdotal style that can be frustrating but ultimately worth reading. For the Presbyterian Record, Canadian Christian writer Phil Callaway writes that he found the book refreshing and inspirational. What's So Amazing About Grace? has been endorsed by a number of public figures, including Irish musician Bono, British adventurer Debra Searle, and World Vision Australia CEO Tim Costello.

== Background ==
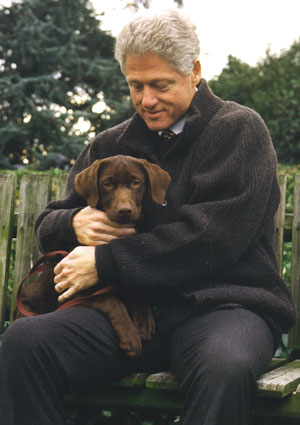
Philip Yancey was inspired by Bill Clinton (pictured here, 1997) to write the book.

Philip Yancey, an American journalist based in Colorado, was inspired to write a book about grace in Christianity when he went to the White House to interview President Bill Clinton. Clinton, a Southern Baptist from birth, told him, "I've been in politics long enough to expect criticism and hostility. But I was unprepared for the hatred I get from Christians. Why do Christians hate so much?" Yancey later said that, although there are many reasons for Evangelical Christians to disapprove of Clinton's policies and lifestyle, hating him was not a valid option for Christians.

The author was further prompted to write about grace when a friend told him about encountering a homeless prostitute in Chicago who began to cry as she told him that she had raised money for drugs by prostituting her two-year-old child. When Yancey's friend asked the woman if she had sought help at a local church, she answered, "Church? Why would I ever go there? I was already feeling terrible about myself. They'd just make me feel worse." This story convinced Yancey that Christians are doing a poor job of communicating the message that God is willing to accept people, regardless of what they have done; the story haunted him, he said, because the woman was "the type of person who would have gone to Jesus. The more unrighteous a person was, the more comfortable they felt around Jesus".

Yancey researched the subject of grace, asking non-Christians what they associated with Evangelical Christianity. None of their responses mentioned grace; most cited political stances, such as opposition to LGBT rights and abortion. The author initially intended to call his book What's So Amazing About Grace: and Why Don't Christians Show More of It? Zondervan, its eventual publisher, objected to the title's forcefulness, despite Yancey's argument that he wrote the book about how "we Christians are simply not known by the greatest gift we have". On February 3, 1997, Christianity Today published an essay by Yancey, the magazine's editor-at-large, with the title "A State of Ungrace", saying that it was the basis of two chapters of Yancey's upcoming book with the working title of What's So Amazing About Grace and Why the World Needs More of It. The book was published later that year with the shorter title What's So Amazing About Grace?

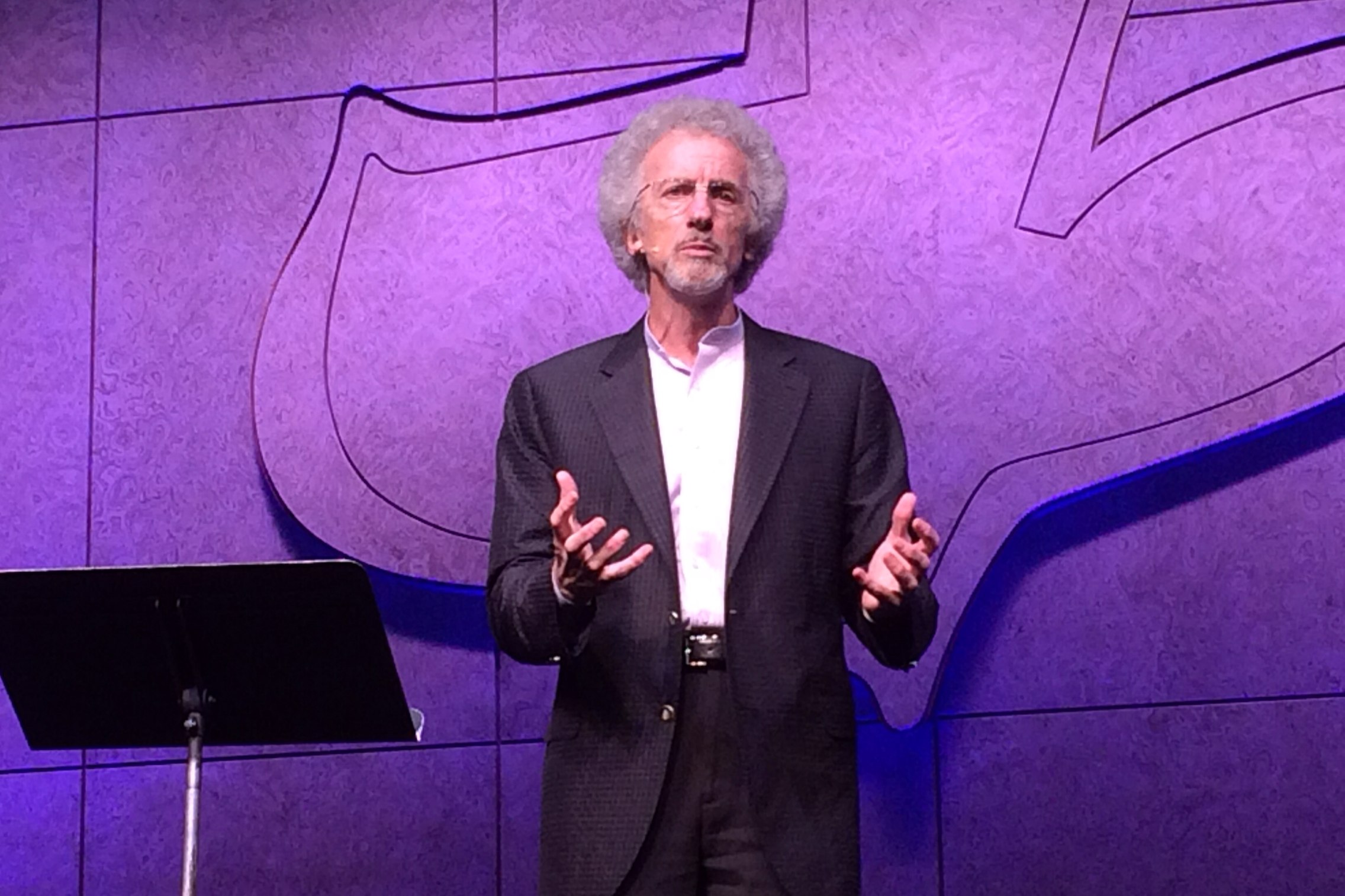
Although Yancey (pictured, 2014) has written several international bestsellers, What's So Amazing About Grace? is his best-known.

According to the author, he began writing the book in the same way he began most of his books: by exploring a question that was unresolved for him. In this case, the question became the book's title. In What's So Amazing About Grace?, Yancey answers this question by writing that God gives grace to people unconditionally, without their need to earn it. His book includes Bible stories, anecdotes from Yancey's life and accounts of historical events. Similar to his other works, What's So Amazing About Grace? has a self-deprecating tone. It describes Yancey's upbringing in a judgmental church, a theme Yancey previously explored in The Jesus I Never Knew and later returned to in Reaching for the Invisible God and Soul Survivor.

What's So Amazing About Grace? sold well at secular and Christian stores. Its popularity in the United Kingdom grew in 2003, when the impending Iraq War boosted sales of religious literature in the country. That March, it was the seventh-bestselling religious book in the UK, behind Rick Warren's The Purpose Driven Life, John Ortberg's If You Want to Walk on Water, You've Got to Get Out of the Boat and Eugene H. Peterson's The Message. What's So Amazing About Grace? is Yancey's best-known book, having sold more than 15 million copies by 2006. Initially, the book was especially popular among baby boomers. Its popularity helped increase sales of Yancey's 2000 book Reaching for the Invisible God, which appeared on religion bestseller lists immediately after publication. What's So Amazing About Grace? is one of several books by Yancey that have become international bestsellers.

== Content ==
Grace did not come to me initially in the forms or the words of faith. I grew up in a church that often used the word but meant something else. ... I became a writer, I feel certain, in an attempt to reclaim words that had been tarnished by graceless Christians.

— Yancey, pages 41-42.

In What's So Amazing About Grace?, Yancey discusses grace, calling it "our last best word". The book's thesis is that, although people crave grace and it is centrally important to the gospel, many local churches ignore grace in their quest to exterminate immorality. Yancey uses the word "ungrace" to describe actions that fail to demonstrate grace. According to the author, the greatest gift the Christian Church can give the world is grace, but the church sometimes offers ungrace instead. Yancey writes that there are secular analogues to most Christian activities benefiting the world, such as social justice work and community service, but that "grace is theological; it comes from God. It's one thing the church can offer that isn't found anywhere else". He describes his experiences attempting to make grace part of the way he lived and not just part of his theology. Yancey quotes Christian counselor David Seamands: "The two major causes of most emotional problems among Evangelical Christians are these: the failure to understand, receive and live out God's unconditional grace and forgiveness; and the failure to give out that unconditional love, forgiveness, and grace to other people".

The author describes his experiences growing up in a church that, despite preaching about grace, did not demonstrate it to others; the church excluded African Americans, dismissed other Christians on the basis of slightly different beliefs, and depicted God as tyrannical and vengeful. Yancey writes, "I grew up with the strong impression that a person became spiritual by attending to grey-area rules," and that church was a place to look good rather than be honest. He contrasts the teachings of early Christians Pelagius and Augustine of Hippo on the subject of grace, with Pelagius believing that divine grace must be earned and Augustine contending that grace is a gift that cannot be earned. Pelagius was declared a heretic by his peers; Augustine was canonized. According to Yancey, many Christians follow Pelagius's teaching on grace during the week but espouse Augustine's on Sunday.

Yancey writes that Christians should be politically active and should, for example, oppose abortion, "but you have to find a way to do it with grace ... If I'm against abortion and I don't find a way to love the woman who got the abortion and even her doctor, then I don't understand the gospel." Yancey recounts Jesus's Parable of the Unforgiving Servant, concluding that God is only willing to forgive us if we are willing to forgive those who have wronged us. In a similar vein, he quotes William Shakespeare's The Merchant of Venice: "How shalt thou hope for mercy, rendering none?"

The author summarizes Karen Blixen's short story "Babette's Feast", which was adapted into a 1987 Danish film. The story is set in a fishing village where the inhabitants avoid all pleasure for religious reasons. Two sisters take in Babette, a Parisian refugee who becomes their personal chef, but they allow her to make only simple, bland meals. Years pass; Babette wins a lottery and spends her winnings on a delicious banquet for the villagers, who agree to eat but not enjoy the food. A banquet guest recognizes Babette as a former world-renowned chef and identifies her gift to undeserving and initially unwilling recipients as grace. In another chapter Yancey similarly summarizes Gabriel García Márquez's novel Love in the Time of Cholera.

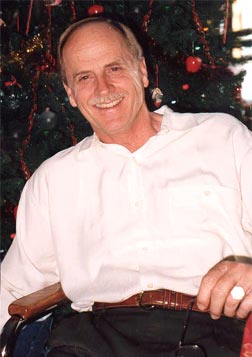
Yancey writes about his friendship with prominent pastor Mel White (pictured, 1995).

Yancey describes his friendship with Mel White, who was a married pastor and Fuller Theological Seminary lecturer with two children when he came out as gay. White had been a ghostwriter for Christian writers including Francis Schaeffer, Billy Graham and Jerry Falwell, and Yancey was surprised by White's self-disclosure. According to the author, he and White had long discussions on the subject "because he wanted so much for me to approve. I couldn't approve." Yancey writes that, although he continued to cultivate his friendship with White, many other Christians shunned the pastor. One chapter, "The Lovesick Father", retells the Parable of the Prodigal Son in a modern setting with the spendthrift child, a daughter. Yancey writes that the closest many people get to experiencing pure grace is a romantic relationship, when they believe that "someone at last feels that I — I! — am the most desirable, attractive, companionable creature on the planet".

== Influence ==
Christians of many denominations treat What's So Amazing About Grace? as a handbook. In it, Yancey coined the phrase "scandal of grace", referring to the idea that God may choose to forgive people who have done evil deeds, citing the conversion of Paul the Apostle who was persecuting Christians. The phrase "scandal of grace" has become widely used in Christian circles. In 2005, the Barna Group, a California-based research firm, asked senior pastors across the United States which books they had found helpful during the past three years. What's So Amazing About Grace? was one of nine books mentioned by at least two percent of the respondents; the other eight included Rick Warren's The Purpose Driven Church and The Purpose Driven Life and John C. Maxwell's The 21 Irrefutable Laws of Leadership.

David Charlesworth, Abbot of Buckfast Abbey in Devon, England, asked Torbay-based theatre company Unleashed Productions to perform a play based on the book. The play had been written by Neil Pugmire and previously performed in 2006 at the Greenbelt Festival. It incorporated stories about apartheid, Gordon Wilson's daughter's death in the Remembrance Day bombing, and Holocaust survivor Simon Wiesenthal. He also included a dramatization of the chapter "The Lovesick Father". Simon Zimmerman wrote the score for the play, which has a cast of nearly forty actors. The play, which took the name of the book, was successfully produced outdoors by Buckfast Abbey in 2010. These outdoor performances were well-attended. According to the Western Morning News, the play is "by turns shocking, humorous and moving, [and] explores how forgiveness and grace can be found in even the most testing circumstances". A Herald Express reviewer called the play inspiring and probably the most unique and unusual in South Devon that summer.

== Reception ==
=== Secular media ===
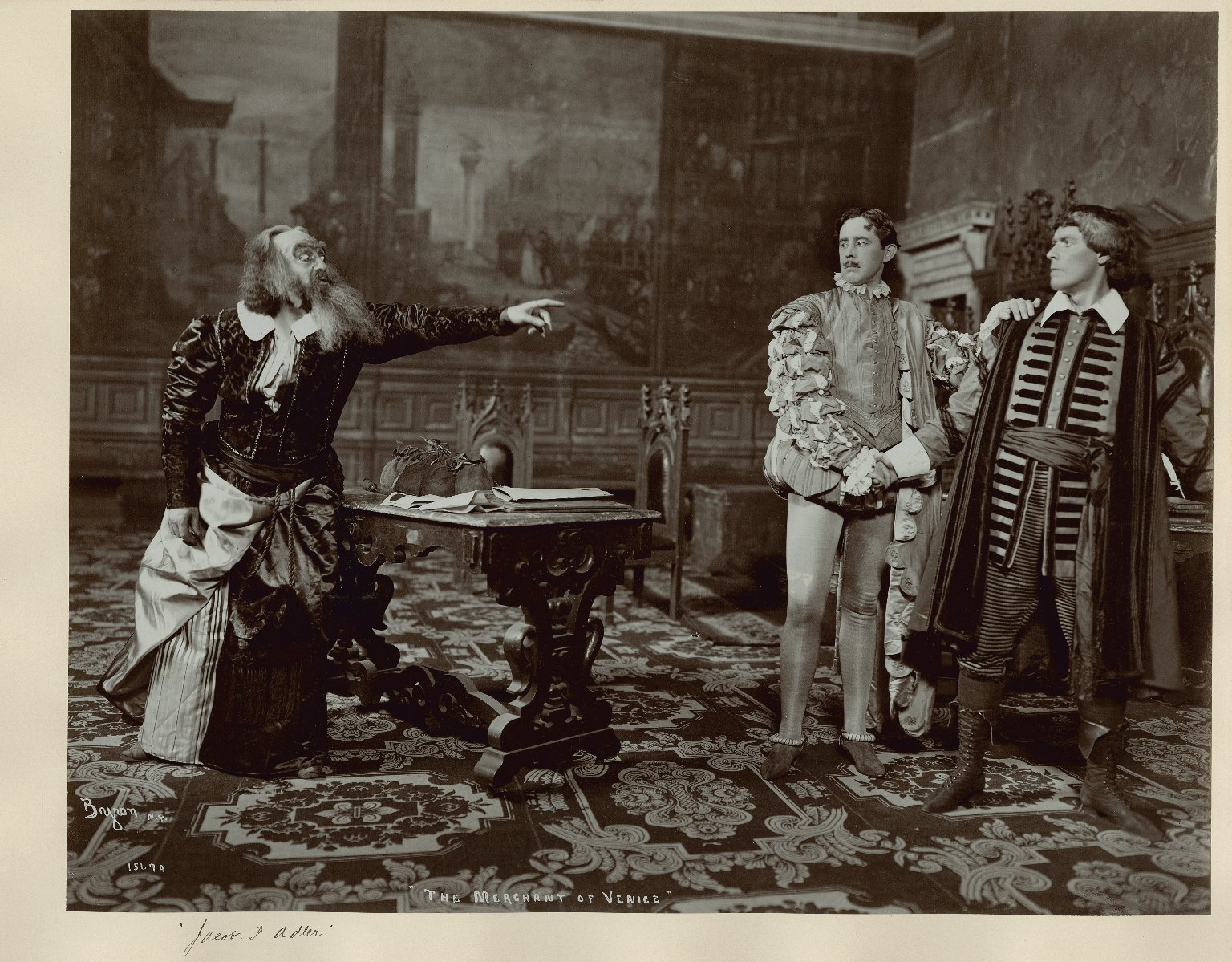
Yancey quotes William Shakespeare's play The Merchant of Venice in What's So Amazing About Grace? (relevant scene pictured); according to Shakespearean scholar Andy Mousley, the quotation demonstrates Yancey's moral universalism.

For Booklist, Ray Olson called What's So Amazing About Grace? a "well-written and engaging book [that] will continue to nourish readers' hunger for spiritual sustenance long after it has answered the appetites of an initial burst of consumers". He compared the book to Max Lucado's The Great House of God, also published in 1997, writing that, although Yancey and Lucado have both written several bestselling Christian books, Yancey's book was edited better. Olson praised as pithy the author's summaries of "Babette's Feast" and Love in the Time of Cholera. In the Calgary Herald, David Briggs compares What's So Amazing About Grace? to Johann Christoph Arnold's Seventy Times Seven: The Power of Forgiveness, also published in 1997; according to both books, Christians should be more charitable to others and less judgmental of them. Henry Carrigan writes in his Publishers Weekly review that "the book's anecdotal style is often frustrating, but Yancey's measured prose and his insights into the stories make the book worth reading". In her 1998 Winnipeg Free Press review, Karen Toole-Mitchell criticizes Yancey's contention that everyone needs grace and that Christians have a special ability to offer it. She calls Yancey's grace "cheap ... because it was not needed, it was not felt, and ultimately it was not received".

In the Coventry Telegraph in 2001, Barbara Goulden called the book's title provocative. A 2003 Daily Express review called What's So Amazing About Grace? "a cogent, intellectually robust defence of [Christianity] without all the crap that goes with so many churches today". Derick Bingham of the Belfast Telegraph recommended the book that year, calling it a liberating read. In 2006, Terry Pluto of the Akron Beacon Journal called What's So Amazing About Grace? and the earlier Disappointment with God Yancey's best books.

Shakespearean scholar Andy Mousley called the book part of the "spiritual self-help genre" in 2007. According to Mousley, Yancey's quotation from The Merchant of Venice demonstrates the author's moral universalism; Yancey views Shakespeare as a sage who conveyed universally applicable morals, a perspective contradicting most contemporary literary critics who distrust moral universalism, using historicism to contextualize Shakespeare's religious views. Dean Poling of The Valdosta Daily Times wrote in 2008 that, in What's So Amazing About Grace?, "Yancey writes about faith in a clear, honest, and inquisitive style" consistent with his other books. In 2010, a Herald Express journalist called the book "hardhitting" and "gritty".

=== Christian media ===
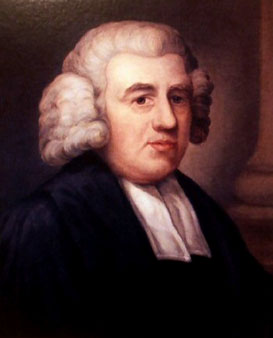
In The Christian Science Monitor, Karla Vallance calls the book similarly sentimental to the hymn "Amazing Grace" by John Newton (pictured).

What's So Amazing About Grace? was named Book of the Year by the Evangelical Christian Publishers Association in 1998 when it was chosen by Christian retailers as the title they most enjoyed selling; Yancey's The Jesus I Never Knew had received the same award two years earlier. In 1998, Christianity Today compared What's So Amazing About Grace? to Joel A. Carpenter's Revive Us Again, writing that both books productively analyze Christian fundamentalism. That year, Karla Vallance's Christian Science Monitor review called the book similarly sentimental to John Newton's hymn "Amazing Grace".

In a 1998 Presbyterian Record review, Canadian Christian writer Phil Callaway writes that What's So Amazing About Grace? made him "thankful afresh for God's grace and challenged to live a life reflecting it". Callaway was haunted by Yancey's question, "If grace is so amazing, why don't Christians show more of it?" and expressed his appreciation to the author at the 1998 Christian Booksellers Association convention. When he asked Yancey why he wrote the book, the author answered: "I long for the church to become a culture of grace ... A graceful church knows how to welcome failure and rewards vulnerability so that a person automatically thinks of the church when needing help." Yancey asked Callaway if he thought the book would generate controversy, and Callaway said it would. Callaway asked Yancey why his book was so harsh in its description of Christians, and Yancey responded, "I'm picking on Christians because I am one". Yancey said that he knew many gracious Christians and that secular culture was filled with examples of ungrace, including media manipulation of body image and the belief that "there ain't no such thing as a free lunch", which contradicts the concept of undeserved grace from God as taught in Christianity.

A 1999 Christian Science Monitor review said that, filled with "poignant stories" that are "likely to ruffle some feathers, this compelling book challenges Christians to become a genuine healing force in society". Presbyterian pastor John Buchanan, editor and publisher of The Christian Century, also reviewed What's So Amazing About Grace? that year, writing that "Yancey is such a good writer and such a generous evangelical that even though I occasionally disagree with his conclusions, I'm glad to be in the same family with him".

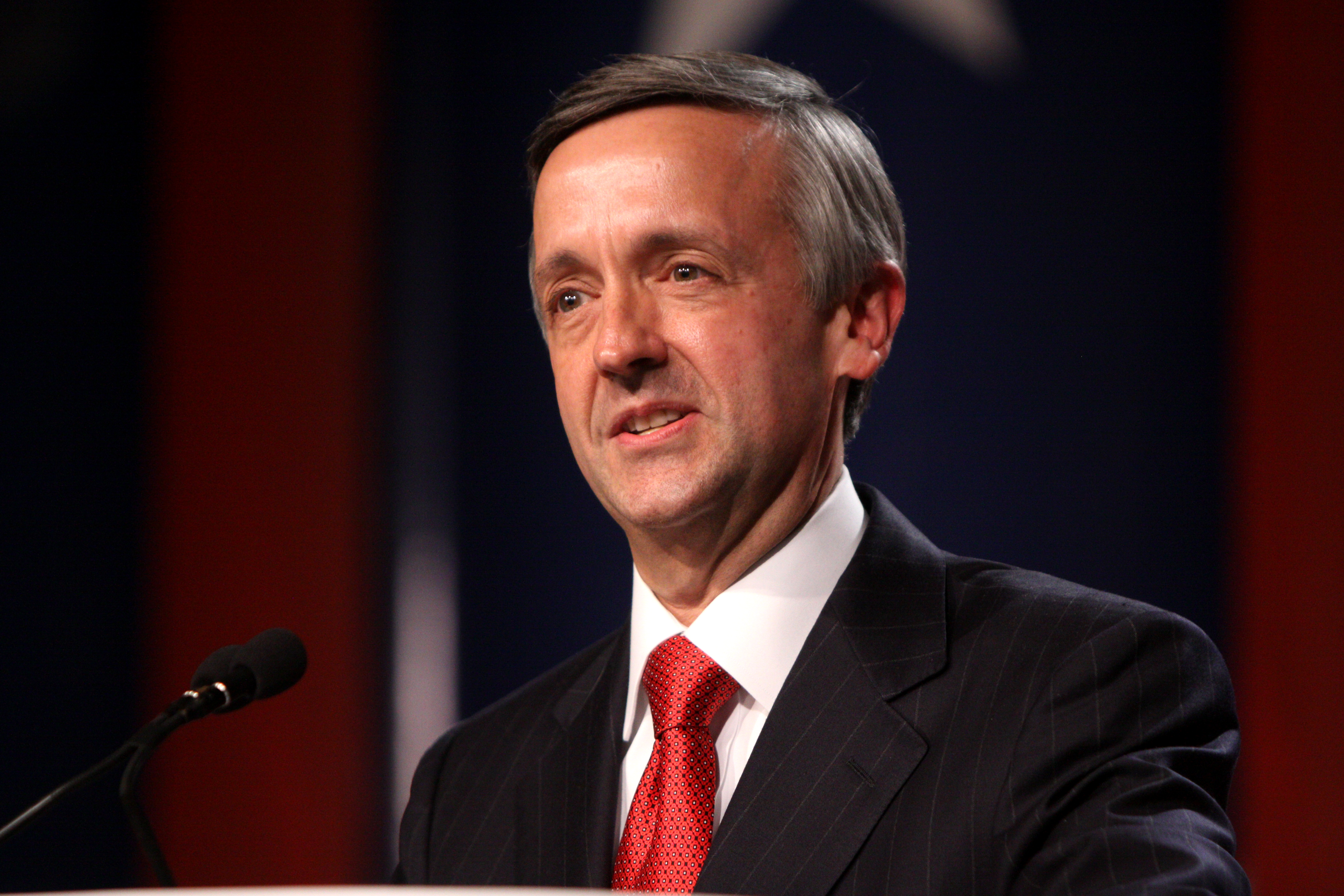
Baptist pastor Robert Jeffress said that What's So Amazing About Grace? "did a valuable service rescuing the doctrine of grace from the legalists who say that we must earn our salvation".

In 2006, What's So Amazing About Grace? placed 17th on Christianity Today's list of fifty books that had most shaped Evangelicals. That year, Robert Jeffress, pastor of First Baptist Church in Dallas, compared What's So Amazing About Grace? to Chuck Swindoll's book The Grace Awakening, calling both "wonderful books on grace [that] did a valuable service rescuing the doctrine of grace from the legalists who say that we must earn our salvation". Christian professor Craig Detweiler writes in his 2008 book A Purple State of Mind: Finding Middle Ground in a Divided Culture that, if he could have given his students a graduation present, it would have been a copy of What's So Amazing About Grace? because many of his Christian students were more concerned with avoiding the forbidden than they were with enjoying the permitted. Detweiler writes that Christianity was founded on forgiveness and that Christians should not bear the burden of guilt, and he therefore agrees with Yancey that "grace" is "our last best word".

In a 2014 article in the "Spiritual Matters" section of the Australian newspaper The Daily Examiner, Reverend Chris Sparks calls What's So Amazing About Grace? "masterful" and writes that Yancey provides a good answer to the question raised by its title. In his 2015 book Unoffendable: How Just One Change Can Make All of Life Better, Christian radio personality Brant Hansen calls What's So Amazing About Grace? life-changing and writes that Yancey's discussion of "Babette's Feast" inspired him to see the film. U.S. Catholic reviewer Mary Lynn Hendrickson also praised Yancey's retelling of Karen Blixen's story.

=== Public figures ===
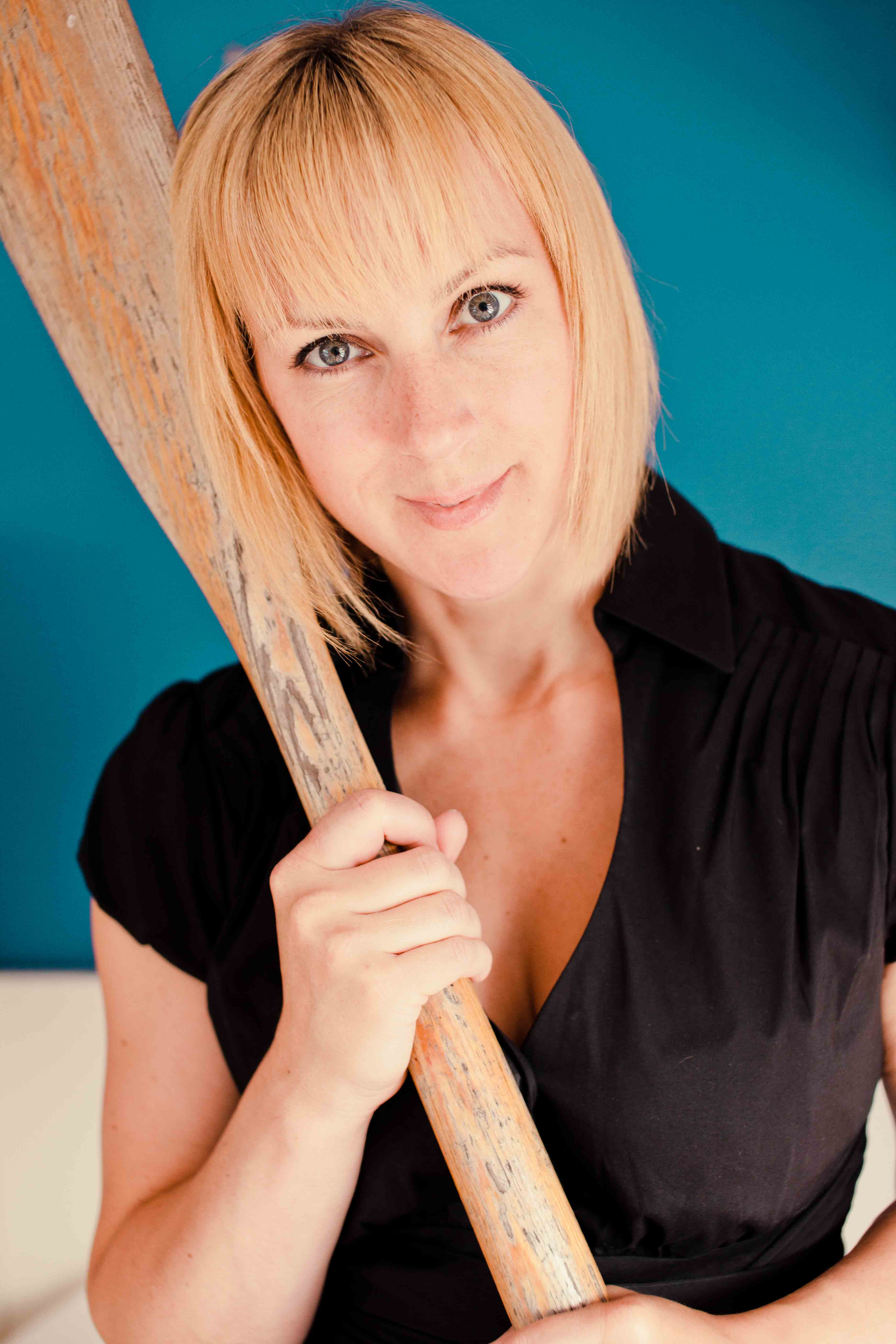
Atlantic Rowing Race participant Debra Searle read Yancey's book during her transatlantic crossing, later crediting it with her return to Christianity.

In 2000, Bear Grylls, the youngest Briton to survive an ascent of Mount Everest, cited What's So Amazing About Grace? as his "favourite holiday read" and "a book that has inspired me a lot". In 2001, American politician Mark Earley called it his favorite book. That year, English musician Noel Gallagher asked Irish musician Bono to explain religion to him because Gallagher knew Bono believed in and prayed to God. Bono spoke with Gallagher on the subject for two hours and sent him a copy of What's So Amazing About Grace? Gallagher later said that he was "going to have a good read of this book", that Bono "made a lot of sense", and that the gift was particularly meaningful because Bono's father had recently died.

During Christmas 2001, while Debra Searle was competing in the Atlantic Rowing Race by making a solo transatlantic crossing from Tenerife to Barbados, her twin sister Hayley sent her a copy of What's So Amazing About Grace? as part of a Christmas package that was delivered at sea. Although she had belonged to a local church as a child, Debra had become irreligious by 2001. After reading Yancey's book while she was alone on the ocean that Christmas, she said, "I felt like God was there with me protecting me". Reading the book brought about a change in her that eventually resulted in her becoming actively involved in Mutley Baptist Church, which is noted for its community engagement.

In 2006, Welsh musician Mal Pope called the book his favorite, comparing Yancey's writing to that of British Christian apologist C. S. Lewis and saying, "The first time I read [What's So Amazing About Grace?] I ended up in tears with every new chapter". In 2012, Pope affirmed that it was still his favorite book. Tim Costello, CEO of World Vision Australia, said in 2008 that the book was important to him. In 2010, American politician Bill Haslam cited What's So Amazing About Grace? and John Heilemann's and Mark Halperin's Game Change as two recent books he enjoyed. Retired Northern Ireland Civil Service head Nigel Hamilton said in 2014 that What's So Amazing About Grace? was his favorite book.

== Bibliography ==
- Detweiler, Craig (2008). A Purple State of Mind: Finding Middle Ground in a Divided Culture. Harvest House. ISBN 978-0-7369-2460-3.
- Hansen, Brant (2015). Unoffendable: How Just One Change Can Make All of Life Better. Thomas Nelson. ISBN 978-0-529-12386-2.
- Mousley, Andy (2007). Re-Humanising Shakespeare: Literary Humanism, Wisdom and Modernity. Edinburgh University Press. ISBN 978-0-7486-2318-1.
- Yancey, Philip (1997). What's So Amazing About Grace?. Zondervan. ISBN 978-0-310-21327-7.
