= Spiritual autobiography =

Non-fiction prose popular in Protestantism

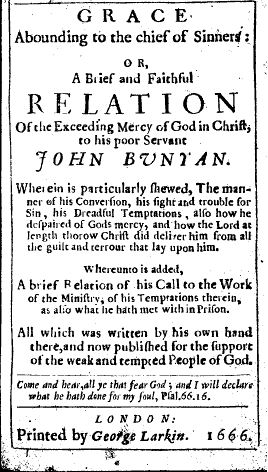
Title page from the first edition of John Bunyan's Grace Abounding

Spiritual autobiography is a genre of non-fiction prose that dominated Protestant writing during the seventeenth century, particularly in England, particularly that of Dissenters. The narrative generally follows the believer from a state of damnation to a state of grace; the most famous example is perhaps John Bunyan's Grace Abounding (1666). The first known spiritual autobiography is Confessions by Augustine of Hippo, or St. Augustine, which stands to this day as a classic when studying this genre.

== Structure ==
Because so many autobiographies were written, they began to fall into a predictable pattern. The "formula" began with a sinful youth, "followed by a gradual awakening of spiritual feelings and a sense of anxiety about the prospects for one's soul." The person would repent, fall again into sin, repent, and sin again; such cycles could last for years. The Bible was often a source of comfort or fear during this time. Finally, the person had a conversion experience, an "epiphany, often of an emotionally shattering character, by which individuals came to realise that they had been singled out by God for salvation." Life was not necessarily easy after this, but it was a good deal less traumatic. These overarching narratives were seen to be not only relevant to human life, but also to human history. Those who practiced this type of spiritual autobiography believed that "history repeats itself not only in man's outward, group existence, but in the spiritual life of individuals."

== Early examples ==
Confessions by Augustine of Hippo is not only the earliest known example of spiritual autobiography, but is widely seen as the first Western autobiography ever written. It consists of 13 books written in Latin between AD 397 and 400, and deals with Augustine's sinful youth and his conversion to Christianity.

Revelations of Divine Love written sometime in the 14th and 15th centuries by Julian of Norwich, which is the earliest surviving example of a book in the English language known to have been written by a woman, is also considered an important spiritual autobiography.

== Evolution ==
The spiritual autobiography's intense focus on the individual has led scholars to see it as a precursor to the novel, with later writers such as Daniel Defoe writing fictionalized accounts of a character's spiritual journey, such as Robinson Crusoe or Moll Flanders. Moreover, because, as G. A. Starr argues, English Protestantism had rejected the "otherworldliness" of Catholicism "and insisted on the compatibility of earthly and spiritual callings," the "utterly mundane activities could be drawn upon to illustrate and enforce religious duties." This also contributed to the growth of what we now know as the novel.

Dating the evolution of this genre to a 17th-century Protestant writing practice overlooks the earlier example of Margery Kempe, from the early 1430s (see Wikipedia entry The Book of Margery Kempe: A Facsimile and Documentary Edition, ed. Joel Fredell. Online edition.)

In the late 20th century, the spiritual autobiography has often reflected the struggle to reconcile variant forms of sexuality with Christian belief traditions, with the element of sincere struggle sometimes producing a polemical tone. Notable among these are titles by Jesuit John J. McNeill, Bothe Feet Firmly Planted in Midair: My Spiritual Journey (Louisville, KY: Westminster John Knox Press); Episcopalian priest Malcolm Boyd, Gay Priest, An Inner Journey (New York: St Martin's Press); Evangelical Minister Mel White's Stranger at the Gate: To Be Gay and Christian in America (New York: Plume/Penguin, 1995); Chris Glaser, self-described originally as a "fundamental Baptist and biblical literalist", published Uncommon Calling: A Gay Man's Struggle to Serve the Church (San Francisco: Harper and Row, 1988).

== Beyond the Abrahamic traditions ==
Recent examples in the genre often come from outside the Abrahamic traditions. See, for example, the expatriate British writer Christopher Isherwood's "My Guru and His Disciple" (London: Methuen, 1980); Jane Hamilton Merritt's "A Meditator's Diary: A Western woman's unique experiences in Thailand Monasteries" (London: Mandala/Unwin paperbacks, 1986); Irina Tweedie's "Daughter of Fire: A Diary of a Spiritual Training with a Sufi Master (Nevada City: Blue Dolphin Publishing, 1986. Originally published as "The Chasm of Fire", 1979); Andrew Harvey's "A Journey in Ladakh: Encounters with Buddhism" (1983) and "Hidden Journey: A Spiritual Awakening" (1991); Mark Matousek's "Sex Death Enlightenment: A True Story" (1996) and Victor Marsh's "The Boy in the Yellow Dress" (Melbourne: Clouds of Magellan Press, 2014). Worth considering too is Carol P. Christ's "Laughter of Aphrodite: Reflections on a Journey to the Goddess" (Harper San Francisco, 1988).

Insightful work coming from the contemporary encounter of Western aspirants with Buddhism, includes Stephen Batchelor's "Confession of a Buddhist Atheist" (2011, New York, Spiegel and Grau). From the Japanese Zen tradition: Soko Morinaga Roshi's "Novice to Master: An Ongoing Lesson in the Extent of My Own Stupidity", trans. by Belenda Attaway Yamakawa (Boston: Wisdom Publications, 2002)

Of special interest here is the remarkable study by Sarah H. Jacoby, "Love and Liberation: Autobiographical Writings of the Tibetan Buddhist Visionary Sera Khandro" (New York: Columbia University Press, 2014). Jacoby's study draws on the rare autobiographical and biographical writing of Sera Kandro, "one of the few Tibetan women to record the story of her life." Sera Khandro (1892 - 1940), who studied outside of the monastic disciplines, also wrote the biography of her guru, Drimé Özer.

== Selection of spiritual autobiographies ==
- The Confessions of St. Augustine (c. 397–400) by Augustine of Hippo
- Revelations of Divine Love (c. 14th and 15th centuries) by Julian of Norwich
- Memorandum of Martha Moulsworth, Widow (1632) by Martha Moulsworth
- Confessions (1640) by Richard Norwood
- The Lost Sheep Found (1660) by Laurence Clarkson
- Grace Abounding (1666) by John Bunyan
- The Narrative of the Persecution of Agnes Beaumont (c. 1674) by Agnes Beaumont
- An Alarm Sounded to Prepare the Inhabitants of the World to Meet the Lord in the Way of His Judgments (1709) by Bathsheba Bowers
- Moll Flanders (1722) by Daniel Defoe
- Personal Narrative (c. 1740) by Jonathan Edwards
- A Short History of the Life of John Crook (1757) by John Crook
- Some Account of the Fore Part of the Life of Elizabeth Ashbridge (1774) by Elizabeth Ashbridge
- The Journal of John Woolman (1774) by John Woolman
- A Son of the Forest (1829) by William Apess
- Retrospection and Introspection (1891) by Mary Baker Eddy
- My Religion (1927) by Helen Keller
- The Seven Storey Mountain (1948) by Thomas Merton
- Days of my Years (written in the 1950s, unpublished in her lifetime) by Georgia Harkness
- The Autobiography of Malcolm X (1965) by Malcolm X
- Play of Consciousness: A Spiritual Autobiography (1978) by Swami Muktananda
- Gay Priest, An Inner Journey (1986) by Malcolm Boyd
- Stranger at the Gate: To Be Gay and Christian in America (1995) by Mel White
- Soul Survivor (2001) by Philip Yancey
- The Spiral Staircase: My Climb Out Of Darkness (2005) by Karen Armstrong

== Resources ==
- Caldwell, Patricia. The Puritan Conversion Narrative. Cambridge. 1983.
- Damrosch, Leopold Jr. God's Plot and Man's Stories. Chicago, 1985.
- Delany, Paul. British Autobiography in the Seventeenth Century. London, 1969.
- Ebner, Dean. Autobiography in Seventeenth-Century England. The Hague, 1971.
- Hindmarsh, D. Bruce. The Evangelical Conversion Narrative: Spiritual Autobiography in Early Modern England. Oxford: Oxford University Press, 2005.
- Spacks, Patricia Meyer. Imagining a Self: Autobiography and Novel in Eighteenth-Century England. Cambridge: Harvard University Press, 1976.
- Starr, G. A. Defoe and Spiritual Autobiography. Princeton: Princeton University Press, 1965.
- Augustine, Saint. The Confessions of St. Augustine. Translated by E. B. (Edward Bouverie) Pusey, 2002.
- Hunter, J. Paul. “Spiritual Biography.” The Reluctant Pilgrim: Defoe’s Emblematic Method and Quest for Form in Robinson Crusoe. Johns Hopkins Press, 1966.
- Bell, Robert. “Metamorphoses of Spiritual Autobiography.” ELH, vol. 44, no. 1, 1977, pp. 108–126.
- Hindmarsh, D. Bruce. The Evangelical Conversion Narrative: Spiritual Autobiography in Early Modern England. OUP Oxford, 2005.
- Ashley, George T. (George Thomas). From Bondage to Liberty in Religion: A Spiritual Autobiography. 2010.
- Keller, Rosemary Skinner. "Women's Spiritual Biography and Autobiography." Encyclopedia of women and religion in North America. Indiana University Press, 2006.
