= Reaching for the Invisible God =

2000 book by Philip Yancey

- First edition cover
- Author: Philip Yancey
- Language: English
- Subject: Personal relationship with God
- Published: 2000 (Zondervan)
- Publication place: United States
- Pages: 304
- ISBN: 978-0-310-23531-6
- Dewey Decimal: 231.7
- LC Class: BV4501.2 .Y36 2000
- Website: philipyancey.com/reaching-for-the-invisible-god

Reaching for the Invisible God: What Can We Expect to Find? is a book written by the evangelical writer Philip Yancey and published by Zondervan in September 2000. The popularity of Yancey's 1997 book What's So Amazing About Grace? helped boost the sales of Reaching for the Invisible God to the point that it appeared on religion bestseller lists immediately upon publication. Within a month, Zondervan reported sales of 94,000 copies. While preparing to write the book, Yancey asked several people how they knew that their trust in Jesus had changed their lives, and one Christian radio host responded, "I have no trouble believing God is good. My question is more, what good is he? ... I cry out to God for help, and it's hard to know just how he answers". Reaching for the Invisible God includes discussion of Yancey's bad experiences of growing up in a very judgmental church, a theme that he had previously discussed in The Jesus I Never Knew and What's So Amazing About Grace? and later returned to in Soul Survivor. In November 2000, Reaching for the Invisible God became the first print book to be released as an e-book by Zondervan, appearing on Microsoft Reader.

The book received the 2001 Christianity Today Book Award in the spirituality category. A Topeka Capital-Journal review called Reaching for the Invisible God "another accessible book from Yancey on a theologically complex subject for those who believe in God, and those who aren't sure if they can". David Crumm of the Lincoln Journal Star wrote a review of the book and said that Yancey's honesty about his own personal pursuit of God is remarkable. In a 2001 review in The Christian Century, Peter Marty writes that Yancey "succeeds brilliantly [in] tell[ing] the truth about the Christian life 'without overselling it'".

== Bibliography ==
- Harm, Frederick R.; Paul E. Robinson; Glenn W. McDonald (2002). Sermons on the Second Readings: Cycle B. CSS Publishing Company. ISBN 9780788019012.
