= Grou (disambiguation) =

Grou is a town in Friesland, Netherlands.

Grou may also refer to:

- Grou (surname), with a list of people of this name
- HMCS Grou, a frigate of the Canadian navy in WWII
