= Assyrian Canadians =

Ethnic group in Canada

Assyrians in Canada
Assyrians

Total population
- 31,800 (by ancestry, 2021 census)

Regions with significant populations
- major: Toronto, Hamilton, Ottawa minor: Vancouver, Windsor, London

Languages
- English · French · Assyrian Neo-Aramaic

Religion
- Mainly Christianity (majority: Syriac Christianity; minority: Protestantism)

Assyrian Canadians (French: Canadiens Assyriens) are Canadians of Assyrian descent or Assyrians who have Canadian citizenship. According to the 2011 census, there were 10,810 Canadians who claimed Assyrian ancestry, an increase compared to the 8,650 in the 2006 Census.

They are the indigenous pre-Arab and pre-Turkic people of northern Iraq, southeast Turkey, northeastern Syria, and northwest Iran, who speak dialects of Eastern Aramaic and are mainly Christian, although some are irreligious. Although most come from the aforementioned countries, many Assyrians have immigrated to Canada from Jordan, Georgia and Armenia as well.

The vast majority of Assyrian Canadians live in Ontario; 17,100 of the 20,000 while 1,000 live in Windsor. Greater Toronto Area contains the bulk of Ontario's Assyrians, especially in the communities of Brampton and Mississauga.

There, however, are very few outside of Ontario within Canada. For instance, Quebec only has 900 Assyrians, only 0.01% of its population.

== History ==
=== The "Presby-Assyrians" ===
Battleford's News-Optimist on June 22, 1979, noted that, "The Canadian West has no greater settlement story than that of the Assyrians who landed on Canadian soil on January 1, 1903."

Reverend Dr. Isaac Adams organized two groups of Assyrian immigrants from Urmia, one in 1903 and 1906. Unlike many other immigrant groups at the time, the settlers were composed of families and not just men. They were the first Presbyterians in the region.

The Presbyterian Record, on January 1, 2008, the anniversary of the arrival of the Assyrian settlers, entitled their commemorative article: "Presby-Assyrians: they escaped persecution to form a unique community in Saskatchewan", connoting their religious and ethnic heritage.

== Reasons for immigrating ==
Most Assyrians arrived in Canada due to both ethnic persecution and religious persecution, mainly from their ancient ancestral Assyrian homeland in northern Iraq, southeast Turkey, northeast Syria and northwest Iran. The migration to Canada may be broken up into a number of distinct periods: early settlement and the subsequent waves of migration sparked by the Assyrian genocide in present-day Turkey and Iran, the Iranian Revolution of 1979 and, more recently, the Iraq War and Syrian Civil War. The last 2006 Census Canada counted 8,650

The first period of known mass-migration came just after the Assyrian genocide in the dying days of the Turkish Ottoman Empire. The second and perhaps largest wave of migration into came during the Iran–Iraq War. Under the shadow of war, Saddam Hussein's al-Anfal Campaign constituted a major force for migration for Iraq's Assyrian population.

== Activism ==
In 2014 after the ISIS attacks on the Nineveh plains, a rally on behalf of Assyrian genocide recognition was organized in Windsor, Ontario, at the City Hall. Over 100 attendants, mostly Assyrian Christians, came out to rally the Canadian government to create an Assyrian State, through the UN. The rally received the support of Brian Masse of the NDP who spoke briefly, as well as a priest from the local Greek Orthodox Church.

== Assyrian population in Canada by province and territory ==
According to the 2021 Canadian Census a total of 27,690 individuals classified "Aramaic languages" as their mother tongue including 17,220 stating Assyrian, 8,860 stating Chaldean, and 1,600 simply stating Aramaic.

Under the Ethnic or Cultural origin section, 19,685 identified as Assyrian and 12,115 as Chaldean for a total of 31,800.

Provinces and territories	(2011)
Ontario	9,420
British Columbia	444
Alberta	380
Manitoba	260
Saskatchewan	175

Provinces and territories	(2016)
Ontario	12,075
British Columbia	545
Alberta	560
Manitoba	40
Saskatchewan	215

== See also ==
- Middle Eastern Canadians
- West Asian Canadians
- Assyrian diaspora
- Assyrian Americans
- Ethnic origins of people in Canada
