= The Great House of God =

Book by Max Lucado

The Great House of God: A Home for Your Heart
- First edition cover
- Author: Max Lucado
- Language: English
- Subject: Lord's Prayer
- Genre: Christian devotional literature
- Published: 1997 (Word Publishing)
- Publication place: United States
- Pages: 227
- ISBN: 978-0-849-91295-5
- OCLC: 60197152
- Dewey Decimal: 226.9/606
- LC Class: BV230.L73 1997
- Preceded by: Alabaster's Song
- Followed by: You Are Special

The Great House Of God: A Home for Your Heart is a Christian religious book written by Max Lucado and published by Word Publishing in 1997. Terry Burns of the Pembroke Daily Observer called The Great House of God "an excellent book on the Lord's Prayer". The Christian Science Monitor listed The Great House of God fifth on its quarterly list of hardcover religion bestsellers in December 1997. In a Publishers Weekly review, Henry Carrigan writes that, although the thoughts in the book "might be powerful in their spoken form, the brevity and the shallowness of their written form abandons readers in the foyer". In a Booklist article, Ray Olson compares the book to Philip Yancey's What's So Amazing About Grace?, which was also published in 1997, and argues that, although Lucado and Yancey have each written several bestselling Christian books, Yancey's book is better edited.

== Bibliography ==
- Lucado, Max (1997). The Great House Of God: A Home for Your Heart. Word Publishing. ISBN 9780849912955.
