= Grace Abounding to the Chief of Sinners =

1666 autobiography by John Bunyan

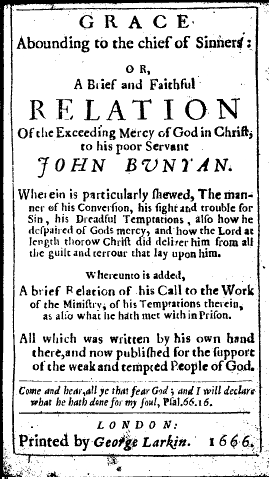
- First edition title page
- Author: John Bunyan
- Language: English
- Genre: Spiritual autobiography
- Publisher: George Larkin
- Publication date: 1666
- Publication place: England

Grace Abounding to the Chief of Sinners, or a Brief Relation of the Exceeding Mercy of God in Christ to his Poor Servant John Bunyan is a Puritan spiritual autobiography written by John Bunyan. It was composed while Bunyan was serving a twelve-year prison sentence in Bedford gaol for preaching without a licence, and was first published in 1666.

The book's title alludes to specific passages from the Epistle to the Romans and the First Epistle to Timothy.

== Biblical allusions ==
The title contains allusions to two Biblical passages: 'Grace Abounding' is a reference to the Epistle to the Romans 5:20, which states 'Where sin abounded, grace did much more abound' (KJV) and 'Chief of Sinners' refers to the First Epistle to Timothy 1:15, where Paul refers to himself by the same appellation.
