= HMCS Grou =

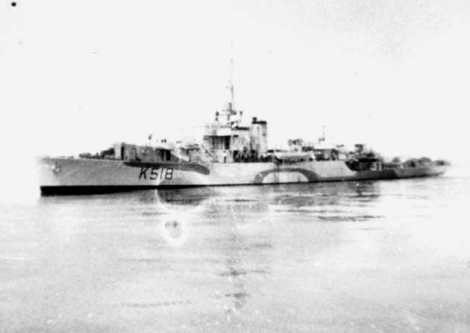
- HMCS Grou

History

Canada
- Name: Grou
- Namesake: Jean Grou
- Operator: Royal Canadian Navy
- Ordered: October 1941
- Builder: Canadian Vickers, Montreal
- Yard number: 168
- Laid down: 1 May 1943
- Launched: 7 August 1943
- Commissioned: 4 December 1943
- Decommissioned: 25 December 1946
- Identification: Pennant number:K 518
- Honours and awards: Arctic 1944, Atlantic 1944
- Fate: Sold, broken up 1948

General characteristics
- Class & type: River-class frigate
- Displacement: 1,445 long tons (1,468 t; 1,618 short tons); 2,110 long tons (2,140 t; 2,360 short tons) (deep load)
- Length: 283 ft (86.26 m) p/p; 301.25 ft (91.82 m)o/a
- Beam: 36.5 ft (11.13 m)
- Draught: 9 ft (2.74 m); 13 ft (3.96 m) (deep load)
- Propulsion: 2 x Admiralty 3-drum boilers, 2 shafts, reciprocating vertical triple expansion, 5,500 ihp (4,100 kW)
- Speed: 20 knots (37.0 km/h); 20.5 knots (38.0 km/h) (turbine ships)
- Range: 646 long tons (656 t; 724 short tons) oil fuel; 7,500 nautical miles (13,890 km) at 15 knots (27.8 km/h)
- Complement: 157
- Armament: 2 × QF 4 in (102 mm) /45 Mk. XVI on twin mount HA/LA Mk.XIX; 1 × QF 12 pdr (3 in (76 mm)) 12 cwt /40 Mk. V on mounting HA/LA Mk.IX (not all ships); 8 × 20 mm QF Oerlikon A/A on twin mounts Mk.V; 1 × Hedgehog 24 spigot A/S projector; up to 150 depth charges

HMCS Grou was a River-class frigate that served with the Royal Canadian Navy during the Second World War. She served primarily as an ocean convoy escort in the Battle of the Atlantic. She was named for Jean Grou, a Roman Catholic martyr from Pointe-aux-Trembles, Quebec. The town's name was considered too long for a warship, so they chose something that was significantly tied to it.

Grou was ordered in October 1941 as part of the 1942–1943 River-class building program. She was laid down on 1 May 1943 by Canadian Vickers at Montreal and launched 7 August 1943. She was commissioned on 4 December 1943 at Montreal.

== Background ==
The River-class frigate was designed by William Reed of Smith's Dock Company of South Bank-on-Tees. Originally called a "twin-screw corvette", its purpose was to improve on the convoy escort classes in service with the Royal Navy at the time, including the Flower-class corvette. The first orders were placed by the Royal Navy in 1940 and the vessels were named for rivers in the United Kingdom, giving name to the class. In Canada they were named for towns and cities though they kept the same designation. The name "frigate" was suggested by Vice-Admiral Percy Nelles of the Royal Canadian Navy and was adopted later that year.

Improvements over the corvette design included improved accommodation which was markedly better. The twin engines gave only three more knots of speed but extended the range of the ship to nearly double that of a corvette at 7,200 nautical miles (13,300 km) at 12 knots. Among other lessons applied to the design was an armament package better designed to combat U-boats including a twin 4-inch mount forward and 12-pounder aft. 15 Canadian frigates were initially fitted with a single 4-inch gun forward but with the exception of HMCS Valleyfield, they were all eventually upgraded to the double mount. For underwater targets, the River-class frigate was equipped with a Hedgehog anti-submarine mortar and depth charge rails aft and four side-mounted throwers.

River-class frigates were the first Royal Canadian Navy warships to carry the 147B Sword horizontal fan echo sonar transmitter in addition to the irregular ASDIC. This allowed the ship to maintain contact with targets even while firing unless a target was struck. Improved radar and direction-finding equipment improved the RCN's ability to find and track enemy submarines over the previous classes.

Canada originally ordered the construction of 33 frigates in October 1941. The design was too big for the shipyards on the Great Lakes so all the frigates built in Canada were built in dockyards along the west coast or along the St. Lawrence River. In all Canada ordered the construction of 60 frigates including ten for the Royal Navy that transferred two to the United States Navy.

== War service ==
Grou arrived at Halifax, Nova Scotia at the end of 1943 and worked up in St. Margaret's Bay. In March 1944, she was assigned to escort group EG 6 based at Derry. In April 1944, Grou made her way to Kola Inlet to escort a RA 59 back to the United Kingdom. From then on she was based at different times at Derry, Portsmouth and Plymouth. During Operation Neptune, the naval component of the invasion of Normandy, Grou was used for anti-submarine patrols to protect the invasion fleet.

In February 1945, Grou returned to Canada to begin a tropicalization refit on 4 March at Dartmouth. She emerged from the refit in September 1945 and was transferred to the west coast in October. On 25 February 1946, she was paid off into the reserve at Esquimalt, British Columbia. She was sold in 1948 to Capital Iron & Metals Ltd. at Victoria, British Columbia and broken up 1948–1949.
