= Grou (surname) =

Grou is a surname. Notable people with the surname include:

- Bruno Grou (born 1990), Portuguese footballer
- Daniel Grou (born 1967), Canadian film and television director
- Jean Grou (1731–1803), French philosopher and Jesuit priest
