= Jean Grou =

French philosopher and Jesuit priest

The Reverend Jean Nicolas Grou SJ
- Born: 23 November 1731; Calais, France
- Died: 13 December 1803 (aged 72); Lulworth Castle, Dorset, England

Education
- Education: Lycée Louis-le-Grand, Jesuit University at Pont-à-Mousson

Philosophical work
- Region: Western philosophy
- Main interests: Ancient Greek philosophy; Plato; Christian mysticism
- Notable works: La Science du Crucifix, (The Science of the Crucifix); and its sequel, La Science Pratique du Crucifix dans l’usage des Sacrements de Pénitence et de Eucharistie
- Notable ideas: spiritual renewal

Jean Nicolas Grou SJ (23 November 1731 – 13 December 1803) was a French Roman Catholic Jesuit priest, teacher, translator and mystic and spiritual writer. After the suppression of the Jesuit order, he sought sanctuary in the Dutch Republic. He returned to France, but at the outbreak of the French Revolution, he escaped to England where he gained refuge with a wealthy English household in Dorset whose house chaplain he became while continuing his literary output.

== Youth ==
Jean Nicholas Grou was born in Calais, in the diocese of Boulogne. He was educated at the Lycée Louis-le-Grand in Paris, which at that time was under the direction of the Jesuits. At the age of fifteen, he entered the Jesuit novitiate. He made his first vows at the age of seventeen, at which time he began teaching. He appreciated the style and morals of the writings of Plato and Cicero. His study of Greek philosophy produced a French translation of Plato's Republic. He went on to translate Plato's Laws followed by his other dialogues.

The Suppression of the Society of Jesus in France led to Grou seeking refuge in Lorraine which was then ruled by the former Polish monarch Stanisław Leszczyński. He lived for several years at Pont-à-Mousson, where he made his final vows in 1765 or 1766. After the death of Leszczyński, the Jesuits were also banished from Lorraine. Grou moved next to the United Provinces of the Netherlands, where he continued to work on Greek philosophy. He later returned to Paris, where he took the alias of Leclaire and acted as a Diocesan priest. He divided his time between his studies and religious duties. Initially, the Archbishop of Paris, Christophe de Beaumont, employed him to write on religion and granted him a temporary pension.

=== Religious work ===
A fellow priest introduced him to a nun of the Visitation who was believed to have special spiritual gifts. She set him on the Way of Perfection and a life of prayer. After this, he focused on writing in addition to his daily devotions and pastoral work. He wrote several books on matters of piety, including, La Morale tirée des Confessions de Saint Augustin (1786), Les Caractéres de la Vraie Devotion (Marks of True Devotion, 1788), and Maximes Spirituelles, avec des Explications (Spiritual Maxims Explained, 1789).

About the same time he also composed several short pious treatises for a high-ranking lady that he served as a spiritual director. These manuscripts, which consisted of nine small volumes, have been preserved. He also began a project which involved fourteen years of research. Before leaving France for England, he had deposited the manuscripts of this work with a noblewoman, who was later arrested during the Reign of Terror, and whose servants burned the papers, fearing they might compromise their mistress.

== French Revolution and move to England ==
Before the French Revolution, Grou was able to keep a low profile, thanks to a pension from the king. When the revolution broke out, at first he wished to remain in Paris and continue his ministry in secret, until his nun friend persuaded him to seek refuge in England. He followed her advice, and was invited by another former Jesuit, who was then chaplain to a prominent English Catholic, Thomas Weld, a member of an old English recusant family and father of the future Cardinal Thomas Weld, to come and stay with his family. Taking up the invitation of the Welds at Lulworth Castle, Grou became spiritual director to members of the family. He was well regarded for his experience in the ways of the spiritual life.

== Crypto-Jesuit at Lulworth ==
In England, he observed the Jesuit rule as far as he could: rising early to make his devotions and celebrating Mass daily, until his last illness. He practised his vows and only asked for the bare minimum for a simple life and to have some of his writing published. In 1796, he had printed in London, the Meditations, en forme de Retraite, sur I’Amour de Dieu (Meditations, in the form of a Retreat, upon the Love of God), and also a treatise called Don de Soi-mēme è Dieu (The Gift of One's Self to God). Whereas some theologians judged his ideas tended towards Quietism, a French bishop found them to be perfectly sound. He also published in London The School of Christ in English.

The Supplement to the Library of Jesuit Writers, published in Rome in 1816, mentions Grou's La Science du Crucifix, (The Science of the Crucifix); and its sequel, La Science Pratique du Crucifix dans l’usage des Sacrements de Pénitence et de Eucharistie (The Practical Science of the Crucifix in the use of the Sacraments of Penance and the Holy Eucharist).

Two years before his death, he had a bad attack of asthma. Some time after, he was seized with apoplexy and then with dropsy. His legs swelled to such an extent that he had to spend the last ten months of his life in an arm-chair. He continued to the very end to hear the confessions of the family with whom he lived. He ended his life in great piety.

== Death ==
On 13 December 1803, at the age of seventy-two, Grou died at Lulworth Castle, where the Weld family had offered him hospitality which he had sought to repay by his thoughtful counsel, and by writing for Thomas Weld and his children some of his more insightful works on Christian asceticism.

The popular American author of spiritual tracts, Philip Yancey, has stated that Grou was "a mystic from the eighteenth century, [who] prescribed that healthy prayer should be humble, reverent, loving, confident, and persevering — in other words, the exact opposite of impatient."

Grou's numerous manuscripts were left to his former companions in religion, who in 1815, published L’Intérieur de Jesus et de Marie (The Inner Life of Jesus and Mary), a work reprinted several times since.

== Works ==
- Characteristics of true devotion
- The Christian Sanctified by the Lord's Prayer
- The Hidden Life of the Soul
- How to Pray
- The Interior of Jesus and Mary
- The Ladder of Sanctity
- A Little Book on the Love of God
- Self-consecration
- Manual for Interior Soul
- Meditations on the Love of God
- The Practical Science of the Cross
- The Spiritual Maxims of Père Grou

Jean Nicolas Grou's writings are also listed at the Open Library and Library Thing.
