= Debra Searle =

British rower and adventurer

Debra Searle MVO MBE
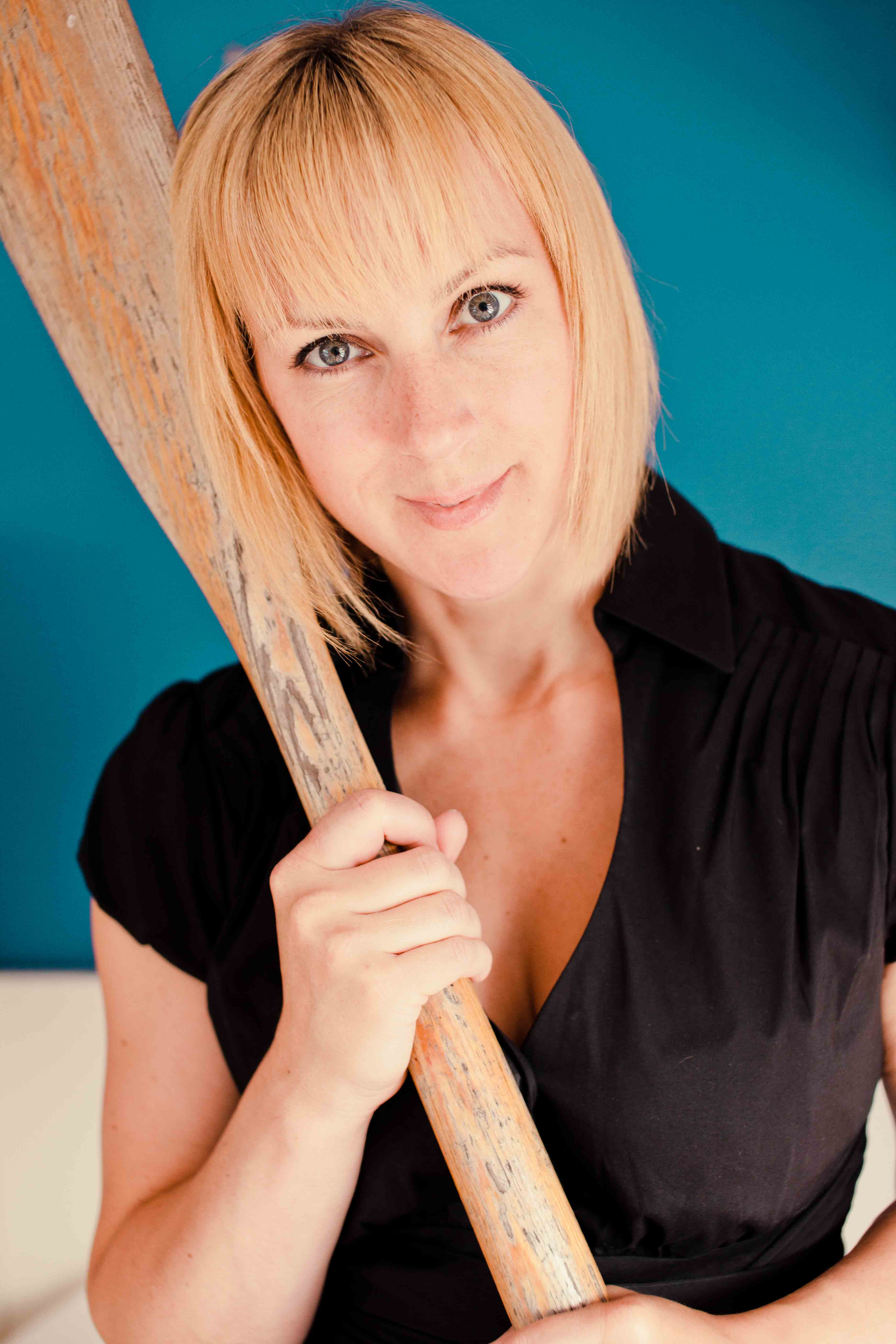
- Searle in 2014

Personal information
- Nationality: British
- Website: www.debrasearle.com

Debra Louise Searle (née Newbury, later Veal) is a British adventurer. Searle rowed across the Atlantic in 2002 alone after her then husband and rowing partner, Andrew Veal, became overwhelmed by the ocean.

== Early life and education ==
Searle has an identical twin sister named Hayley Barnard.

== Career ==
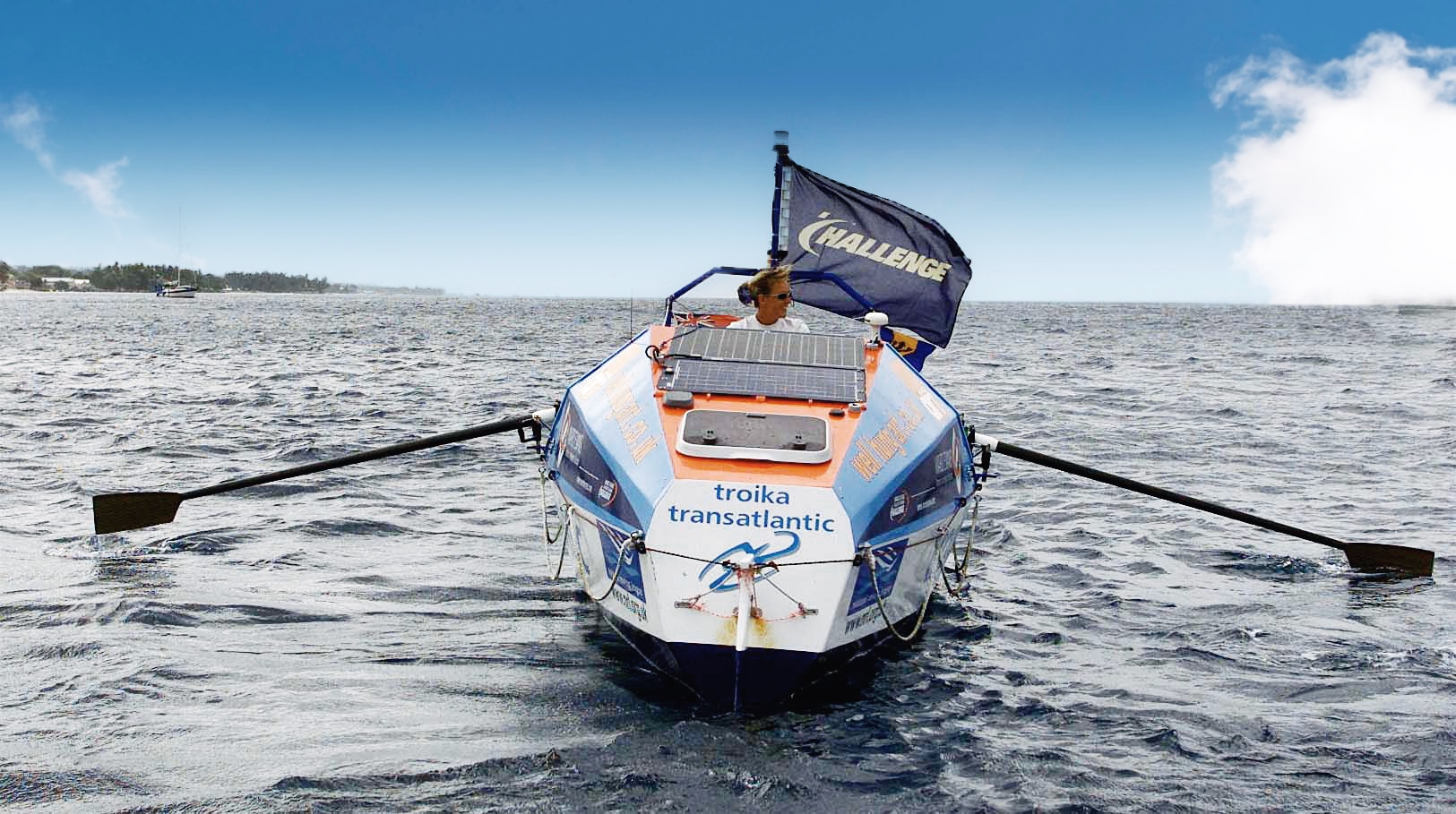
Debra Searle arriving into Barbados after 3.5 months alone rowing the Atlantic

Searle and her then husband Andrew Veal attempted to row across the Atlantic in the Ward Evans Atlantic Rowing Race during 2001–2002. Her husband was forced to retire from the race after eight days after becoming mentally overwhelmed by the ocean and had to return to land. She continued alone, arriving in Barbados after 111 days at sea. She published a book titled Rowing it Alone in September 2002. Ben Fogle, the adventurer and TV presenter who rowed the Atlantic with James Cracknell in 2005 claimed to have been inspired by Searle's crossing in his book The Crossing, written with James Cracknell. Following her solo row across the Atlantic, Searle developed a career as a public speaker.

In 2003, she was the subject of an episode of the BBC documentary series Extreme Lives. In 2007, she captained a Dragon Boat across the English Channel.

== Awards and honours ==
Searle was appointed a Member of the Order of the British Empire (MBE) in the 2002 Birthday Honours. She was appointed Member of the Royal Victorian Order (MVO) in the 2014 New Year Honours for her work for the Royal Family and as a trustee of The Duke of Edinburgh's Award.

== Publications ==
- Veal, Debra (2002). Rowing it Alone: One Woman's Extraordinary Transatlantic Adventure. Foreword by Chay Blyth. Robson Books. ISBN 978-1-8610-5547-7.
