= The Journal of John Woolman =

1774 book by John Woolman

The Journal of John Woolman is an autobiography by John Woolman which was published posthumously in 1774 by Joseph Crukshank, a Philadelphia Quaker printer. Woolman's journal is one of the longest continually published books in North America since it has never been out of print.

The Journal adds to his other published works and gives greater evidence to his character as he discusses ideas of anti-slavery and anti-materialism, as well as discussing power's ability to corrupt. The work also discusses God's divine power and goodness for all on the planet Earth.

The work has remained in print due to its focus on making life simple and the hopeful message of God's divine goodness. Woolman is one of the first early American writers, besides John Smith, who is not a Puritan. Puritans were the most prominent writers in Colonial America, and it was during the time of this publication that writing began to move away from being the exclusive domain of Puritan authors. Woolman's writing is at the forefront of this transition.

== Anti-slavery ==
=== Slavery ===
Woolman's Journal focuses much on his decision to support anti-slavery. Woolman states that while in the Province of Maryland, "a deep and painful exercise came upon me....as the people in this and the Southern Provinces live much on the labor of slaves, many of whom are used hardly...". The struggle is first seen when he discusses how he was required to write a bill of sale for a Quaker friend who had sold a slave. He completed the bill of sale because it was part of his job and the man that sold the slave was also a Quaker. However, after this event, Woolman took a more official stance in regard to his opinion, even explaining during the actual event that he "believed slavekeeping to be a practice inconsistent with the Christian religion". His journal shows his inner turmoil as he grapples with understanding how he truly feels about the selling and buying of slaves that eventually led to publishing works such as his Some Considerations on the Keeping of Negroes.

Slavery is prominent in Woolman's journal, and it returns again shortly after the scene with the bill of sale as he discusses further opinions he has on the subject. He takes time to discuss those who he visited that did not take care of their slaves and how that made him feel uncomfortable while visiting. In contrast, Woolman discusses individuals who did take care of their slaves and how that made him feel more at ease. Shortly after that comparison, Woolman moves beyond the treatment of slaves and reflects on the idea that even if slaves were well cared for, they were still taken from their homes. His continual discourse on slavery in his journal makes Woolman one of the first abolitionists.

=== Power ===
Woolman addresses one of the issues of slavery to be men having too much power: "men having power too often misapplied it...we made slaves of the Negroes and the Turks made slaves of the Christians." This is an idea already a large part of American heritage, as many who traveled to America were seeking freedom of some kind. Woolman's focus on how power corrupts continued to be impactful as the nascent beginnings of the American Revolution began to coalesce (which was what had been occurring when Joseph Crukshank published the journal).

== God's divine goodness ==
=== Quakers and Puritans ===
Woolman spends time in his journal writing about his relationship with God and his perspective on God. He discusses that as early as the age of 7 he "began to be acquainted with the operations of divine love". His perspective on God and God's love is important, as it offers clear contrasts from the opinions that Puritans had. Puritans believed in a less tolerable God and, as Jonathan Edwards in Sinners in the Hands of An Angry God suggests, a God who is angry with sinners on Earth, nearly as much as Woolman suggests. Woolman's journal speaks of a God who gives revelation and creates a feeling of sweetness as well as strong feelings of mercy.

=== Tolerance ===
The opinion on God's love and his strong mercy is what makes Woolman and other Quakers more tolerant to others. Woolman writes: "I found no narrowness respecting sects and opinions, but believed that sincere, upright-hearted people in every Society who truly loved God were accepted of him." This is a very different belief from those of other major religions in American at the time. The Puritans were very intolerant, even within their own ranks--intolerance is one of the causes of the Salem witch trials. Quakers' differing opinion on God is also what brings about a major dislike of Quakers by Puritans. They could not stand the opinions of Quakers and considered it a type of religious heresy. Woolman does not discuss this in his Journal, instead focusing on what he knows and believes. In fact, Woolman believes that tolerance and mercy towards others were given from God: "he whose tender mercies are over all his works hath placed a principle in the human mind which incites to exercise goodness towards every living creature."

These kinds of connections involving tolerance and mercy towards other people are what makes Woolman's writings easier to connect with. He appears more real and sincere because of his tolerance towards others. Christians now connect with his opinions on mercy, and this is part of the reason he has remained in print since the first publication of his journal.

== Anti-materialism ==
Woolman did many things in his life, varying from merchant, to tailor, to Quaker preacher. Along this path he decided that his wealth and prosperity were hurting him and his relationship with God: "the increase became my burden". He turned away from all his merchandise and placed his focus somewhere else, no longer even desiring it.

This aspect of Woolman's writing moves beyond Quaker ideals. It is something that contains aspects of Americanism, also portrayed in later authors like Henry Thoreau as well as Walt Whitman. He in some ways precedes transcendentalism.

Woolman seems to believe in the importance of anti-mercantilism, as following his decision to forgo his wealth he becomes much more visionary and believes to become closer to God.

The 1971 version of The Journal and Major Essays of John Woolman includes his Plea for the Poor, or a Word of Remembrance and Caution to the Rich, originally published posthumously in 1793, but believed to have been written around 1763-64.

== Legacy ==
According to Martin E. Marty, "the Journal remains a classic, among the better personal documents of [the] century, to be remembered alongside the best work of Benjamin Franklin and Jonathan Edwards, a quiet revelation of the American soul on its sacred journey."

It was through reading The Journal of John Woolman that the Grimké sisters, Sarah and Angelina Grimké, converted to the Quaker faith and were set on a path to becoming notable activists in the fields of abolitionism and women's rights.
