= Max Lucado =

American Christian author and minister (born 1955)

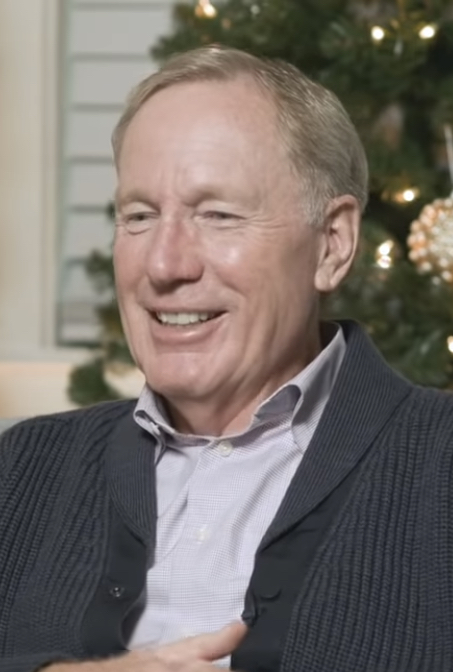
- Lucado in 2019
- Born: January 11, 1955 (age 71); San Angelo, Texas, U.S.
- Education: Abilene Christian University
- Occupations: Author, Minister, Speaker
- Spouse: Denalyn Lucado
- Children: 3
- Writing career
- Years active: 1985–present
- Genres: Inspirational Christian Living, Children's
- Notable awards: Gold Medallion Book Award
- Website: www.maxlucado.com

Max Lucado (born January 11, 1955) is an American author and minister at Oak Hills Church (formerly the Oak Hills Church of Christ) in San Antonio, Texas.

== Life ==
Lucado was born in San Angelo, Texas, the youngest of four children to Jack and Thelma Lucado. He grew up in Andrews, Texas. His father, of Italian ancestry, was an oil field worker, and his mother served as a nurse.

Lucado attended Abilene Christian University where he received an undergraduate degree in Mass Communication. While a student at Abilene Christian, Lucado worked to pay his way through college by selling books door-to-door with the Southwestern Advantage entrepreneurial program. Initially he wished to become a lawyer, but has said that a required Bible course at the university and a mission trip made him change his mind, deciding instead to become a missionary. However, this required that Lucado get a graduate degree in Bible and Biblical Studies, and have at least two years experience ministering to a church. Lucado graduated from Abilene Christian University with a master's degree in Bible and Biblical Studies.

After graduation, Lucado became an associate minister at Central Church of Christ in Miami, Florida. His responsibilities initially included overseeing a singles' group and writing a column for the church's newsletter. After two years in Miami, the now newlywed Lucado and his wife, Denalyn Lucado, moved to Rio de Janeiro, Brazil to become full-time missionaries. In 1987, Lucado's father died from Lou Gehrig's disease. After five years in Brazil, he brought his family back to the United States to be closer to his mother.

Max and his wife appeared on Fixer Upper (S3 E9 which aired January 26, 2016) when his daughter Sara and her husband Jeff Jones purchased a home that was to be remodeled by Chip & Joanna Gaines. Max asked that a quote that he had written for his daughter's wedding when he officiated be incorporated in some way into the new home without the couple knowing ahead of time. The quote was "Would you take these two of dust and bone, born of flesh, then would you make them one? Would you speak again the words you spoke when Adam slept and Eve Awoke? Would you let your wine replace our water and look with grace on this son, this daughter? Oh Lord of Eden in your majesty create again your tapestry. One heart where there were two. This is the prayer we lift to you." Joanna asked Clayton Thompson to make the wall art and it was placed in the "moffice" (the mudroom and office combined).

== Oak Hills Church ==
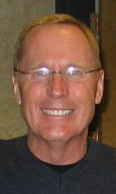
Lucado in 2005

In 1988, he was hired as a minister to the Oak Hills Church of Christ in San Antonio, Texas. He stopped taking a salary from the congregation in 1990 because he was already an established successful author.

During his tenure, Oak Hills began using musical instruments in worship services and held the belief that baptism isn't required for salvation (things not in accord with two key doctrines of the Churches of Christ); ultimately Oak Hills dropped its affiliation with them in 2003, calling itself simply "Oak Hills Church".

After serving as the senior minister at Oak Hills Church in San Antonio, Texas, for 20 years, Lucado announced in early 2007 that he was stepping down due to health concerns related to atrial fibrillation. Lucado has since resumed the more limited ministry role of writing and preaching minister alongside current lead minister Travis Eades.

== Gateway Church ==
Following the resignation of Pastor Robert Morris from Gateway Church, located near Fort Worth, Lucado agreed to serve as interim teaching pastor there, a non-administrative position. He says he will not be leaving Oak Hills Church and plans to preach in both locations.

== Views ==
He believes the Bible to be infallible. Lucado is a credobaptist.

Lucado adheres to a trinitarian view of God.

Lucado has stated that he believes in “the traditional biblical understanding of marriage” as between a man and a woman, and argues that same-sex marriage sinfully goes against God's original design. This said, he has strongly expressed disapproval of gay bashing, stating that, "LGBTQ individuals and LGBTQ families must [still] be respected and treated with love. They are beloved children of God because, they are made in the image and likeness of God." He adds: "Faithful people may disagree about what the Bible says about homosexuality, but we agree that God's holy Word must never be used as a weapon to wound others."

== Accomplishments ==
Lucado has written almost 100 books with over 150 million copies in print. He was recipient of the Charles "Kip" Jordon Gold Medallion Christian Book of the Year award three times (for his books Just Like Jesus, In the Grip of Grace and When God Whispers Your Name), and has also appeared regularly on several bestseller lists including the New York Times Best Seller List.

Lucado was named "America's Pastor" by Christianity Today magazine and in 2005 was named by Reader's Digest as "The Best Preacher in America." He has also been featured on The Fox News Channel, NBC Nightly News, Larry King Live, LLBN, and USA Today. He has been a featured speaker at the National Prayer Breakfast.

== Education ==
- B.A. Abilene Christian University (1977)
- M.A. Abilene Christian University

== Books ==
- On the Anvil: Being Shaped into God's Image, Carol Stream, Illinois: Tyndale House, 1985. ISBN 978-1-4143-1553-9.
- No Wonder They Call Him the Savior, New York, New York: Doubleday Publishing, 1986. ISBN 978-0-8807-0611-7.
- God Came Near: Chronicles of the Christ, Portland, Oregon: Multnomah Press, 1987. ISBN 978-0-8807-0206-5.
- Six Hours One Friday: Anchoring to the Power of the Cross Portland, Oregon: Multnomah Press, 1989. ISBN 978-0-8807-0314-7.
- The Applause of Heaven, Dallas, Texas: Word Publishing, 1990. ISBN 978-0-8499-1324-2.
- In the Eye of the Storm: A Day in the Life of Jesus, Dallas, Texas: Word Publishing, 1991. ISBN 978-0-8499-4325-6.
- Just In Case You Ever Wonder, Nashville, Tennessee: Thomas Nelson, 1992. P
- And the Angels Were Silent, Portland, Oregon: Multnomah Press, 1992.
- Tell Me the Story Wheaton, Illinois: Crossway Books, 1992.
- He Still Moves Stones, Dallas, Texas: Word Publishing, 1993.
- Tell Me the Secrets, Wheaton, Illinois: Crossway Books, 1993.
- The Crippled Lamb, Nashville, Tennessee: Thomas Nelson, 1994.
- When God Whispers Your Name, Dallas, Texas: Word Publishing, 1994.
- The Children of the King, Wheaton, Illinois: Crossway Books, 1994.
- The Final Week of Jesus Portland, Oregon: Multnomah Press, 1994. ISBN 978-0-88070-630-8.
- A Gentle Thunder, Dallas, Texas: Word Publishing, 1995.
- The Song of the King, Wheaton, Illinois: Crossway Books, 1995.
- The Inspirational Study Bible Nashville, Tennessee: Thomas Nelson, 1995. ISBN 978-0-84995-123-7.
- In the Grip of Grace, Dallas, Texas: Word Publishing, 1996.
- The Glory of Christmas, Dallas, Texas: Word Publishing, 1996.
- God's Inspirational Promises, Dallas, Texas: Word Publishing, 1996.
- Walking with the Savior, Carol Stream, Illinois: Tyndale House, 1996.
- Alabaster's Song, Nashville, Tennessee: Thomas Nelson, 1996.
- Life Lessons Bible Study Guides 1996–1998.
- The Great House of God, Dallas, Texas: Word Publishing, 1997.
- You Are Special, Wheaton, Illinois: Crossway Books, 1997.
- Cosmic Christmas: An Angel's Story, Dallas, Texas: Word Publishing, 1997.
- The Greatest Moments, Dallas, Texas: Word Publishing, 1997.
- The Cross, Portland, Oregon: Multnomah Press, 1998.
- The Heart of Christmas, 1998.
- Just Like Jesus, Dallas, Texas: Word Publishing, 1998.
- The Christmas Cross, Dallas, Texas: Word Publishing, 1998. (the 2003 American Christian film, Christmas Child, was based on this short story)
- Let the Journey Begin, Dallas, Texas: Word Publishing, 1998.
- When Christ Comes, Dallas, Texas: Word Publishing, 1999.
- Just the Way You Are, Wheaton, Illinois: Crossway Books, 1999.
- The Gift for All People, Portland, Oregon: Multnomah Press, 1999.
- Opening Windows, 1999.
- Because I Love You, Wheaton, Illinois: Crossway Books, 1999.
- Topical Bible Study Series, 1999–2000.
- He Chose the Nails, Dallas, Texas: Word Publishing, 2000.
- Grace for the Moment, Nashville, Tennessee: J. Countryman, 2000.
- In the Footsteps of Jesus, Carol Stream, Illinois: Tyndale House, 2000.
- He Did This Just For You, 2000.
- Small Gifts in God's Hands, Nashville, Tennessee: Thomas Nelson, 2000.
- Traveling Light, Nashville, Tennessee: W Publishing Group, 2001.
- Traveling Light Journal, Nashville, Tennessee: W Publishing Group, 2001.
- America Looks Up, Nashville, Tennessee: W Publishing Group, 2001.
- One Incredible Moment, Nashville, Tennessee: J. Countryman, 2001.
- Safe in the Shepherd's Arms, Nashville, Tennessee: J. Countryman, 2001.
- Just For You, Nashville, Tennessee: W Publishing Group, 2002.
- A Love Worth Giving, Nashville, Tennessee: W Publishing Group, 2002.
- Traveling Light for Mothers, Nashville, Tennessee: W Publishing Group, 2002.
- He Chose You, Nashville, Tennessee: Thomas Nelson, 2002.
- Just Like Jesus (Devotional), 2002.
- A Heart Like Jesus, 2002.
- What the Cross Means to Me, 2002.
- Next Door Savior, Nashville, Tennessee: W Publishing Group, 2003.
- Experiencing the Heart of Jesus,
- God Thinks You're Wonderful, 2003. Nashville, Tennessee: J. Countryman, 2003.
- Hermie, A Common Caterpillar, Nashville, Tennessee: Thomas Nelson, 2003. ISBN 1-4003-0126-2
- It's Not About Me, Nashville, Tennessee: Integrity Publishers, 2004.
- Come Thirsty, Nashville, Tennessee: W Publishing Group, 2004.
- Everyday Blessings, Nashville, Tennessee: J. Countryman, 2004.
- The Story: The Bible as One Continuing Story of God and His People Zondervan, 2005, 2008, 2011. Various editions, including Teen Edition ISBN 978-0-310-72280-9.
- Cure for the Common Life, Nashville, Tennessee: W Publishing Group, 2005.
- Turn, Portland, Oregon: Multnomah Press, 2005.
- God's Mirror, Nashville, Tennessee: Integrity Publishers, 2005.
- The Way Home: A Princess Story, Nashville, Tennessee: Thomas Nelson, 2005.
- God's Promises For You, 2006. (Updated Edition)
- Your Special Gift, Wheaton, Illinois: Crossway Books, 2006.
- Grace For The Moment II, Nashville, Tennessee: J. Countryman, 2006.
- Facing Your Giants, Nashville, Tennessee: W Publishing Group, 2006.
- Every Day Deserves a Chance: Wake Up to the Gift of 24 Hours, Nashville, Tennessee: Thomas Nelson, 2006.
- 3:16: The Numbers of Hope, Nashville, Tennessee: W Publishing Group, 2007.
- Cast Of Characters, Nashville, Tennessee: Thomas Nelson, 2008.
- Fearless, Nashville, Tennessee: Thomas Nelson, 2009.
- You Changed My Life, Nashville, Tennessee: Thomas Nelson, 2010.
- The Lucado Life Lessons Study Bible, NKJV, 2010.
- Outlive Your Life: You Were Made to Make A Difference, Nashville, Tennessee: Thomas Nelson, 2010.
- Max on Life; Answers and Inspiration for Today's Questions, 2011.
- God's Story, Your Story: When His Becomes Yours, 2011. ISBN 0-310-29403-7.
- God's Story, Your Story: Youth Edition, 2011. ISBN 0-310-72546-1
- The Christmas Candle, Thomas Nelson (publisher), 2013.
- God Will Carry You Through, Nashville, Tennessee: Thomas Nelson, 2013. ISBN 978-1-4003-2311-1
- Who Is This Jesus?, Worthy Publishing, 2013 ISBN 9781936034666
- You'll Get Through This: Hope and Help for Your Turbulent Times, Nashville, Tennessee: Thomas Nelson, 2013
- Before Amen: The Power of a Simple Prayer, Nashville, Tennessee: Thomas Nelson, 2014. ISBN 978-0849948480
- Miracle at the Higher Grounds Cafe, Nashville, Tennessee: Thomas Nelson, 2015. ISBN 978-0-718000882
- Glory Days: Living Your Promised Land Life Now, Nashville, Tennessee: Thomas Nelson, 2015. ISBN 978-0849948497
- Because of Bethlehem: Love Is Born, Hope Is Here, Nashville, Tennessee: Thomas Nelson, 2016. ISBN 978-0849947599
- Anxious for Nothing: Finding Calm in a Chaotic World, Nashville, Tennessee: Thomas Nelson, 2017. ISBN 978-0-718096120
- Unshakable Hope: Building Our Lives on the Promises of God, Nashville, Tennessee: Thomas Nelson, 2018. ISBN 978-0-718096144
- How Happiness Happens: Finding Lasting Joy in a World of Comparison, Disappointment, and Unmet Expectations, Nashville, Tennessee: Thomas Nelson, 2019.
- You Are Never Alone: Trust in the Miracle of God's Presence and Power, Nashville, Tennessee: Thomas Nelson, 2020.
- You Were Made for This Moment: Courage for Today and Hope for Tomorrow, Nashville, Tennessee: Thomas Nelson, 2021.
- Help Is Here: Finding Fresh Strength and Purpose in the Power of the Holy Spirit, Nashville, Tennessee: Thomas Nelson, 2022.
- What Happens Next: A Traveler's Guide Through the End of This Age, Nashville, Tennessee: Thomas Nelson, 2022. ISBN 9781400260003

== Other publications ==
Movies

- Hermie, A Common Caterpillar, 2003. the first in a series of Christian videos for children, based on his book with the same title (The series ranked #8 on The Top Christian Cartoon Series list.)
- 3:16: Stories of Hope, 2007. DVD. OCLC 156887840
- God's Story, Your Story, 2011. DVD ISBN 0-310-88986-3
- The Christmas Candle (2013)

Mobile apps

- His is Mine, 2011. Based on his book God's Story, Your Story: When His Becomes Yours, and compatible with the iPhone, iPod Touch, and iPad.

== Notes ==
Media Company to Release Companion CD & DVD to New Lucado Book
