= The Jesus I Never Knew =

1995 book by Philip Yancey

- Author: Philip Yancey
- Language: American
- Subject: Christology
- Genre: Theology
- Publisher: Zondervan
- Publication date: 9 September 1995
- Publication place: U.S.
- Media type: Hardcover, Paperback, E-Book at Google Books
- ISBN: 9780310385707
- OCLC: 440559215
- Dewey Decimal: 232
- LC Class: BT202 .Y33 1995
- Preceded by: Pain: The Gift Nobody Wants
- Followed by: Finding God in Unexpected Places

The Jesus I Never Knew is a popular 1995 Christological book by the American Christian author Philip Yancey. It won the Gold Medallion Book Award and ECPA Christian Book of the Year 1996: it is a book that appeals to the wider Christian public for its personal approach to the figure of Jesus, with a fresh and vivid portrayal extracted from a dynamic reading of the four canonical gospels.

== Synopsis ==
With this book, Yancey intends to offer a new and different perspective on the life of Christ and his work – his teaching, his miracles, his death and resurrection – and ultimately, who he was and why he came. The author chronicles his journey of discovery, looking past traditionally perpetuated beliefs about Jesus and reporting facts about him and his teaching as recorded by the authors of the gospels. Juxtaposing the Gospel events with the world we live in today, The Jesus I Never Knew gives a dynamic portrait of this central figure of history. The author examines some of the radical words of Jesus with a willingness to tackle the difficult questions raised by them, and asks whether today Christians are taking them seriously enough.

Yancey affirms:

"No one who meets Jesus ever stays the same. In the end I found the process of writing this book to be a great act of faith-strengthening. Jesus has rocked my own preconceptions and has made me ask hard questions about why those of us who bear his name don't do a better job of following him."

Candidly recalling his own journey of rediscovery of Jesus, Yancey demonstrates to his readers the arc of many Christians' intellectual faith walk. First he addresses possible misconceptions about Jesus physical appearance (probably not tall and gaunt, based on what one knows today of Jews of the time), moves onto his character, and his interactions with people and his disciples. He sincerely questions preconceived notions about who Jesus was and is, drawing from a number of sources including many of Hollywood's various celluloid representations.

Right through the book, Yancey creates what is essentially a prose harmony of the Gospels, reconstructing Jesus life, challenges, and teachings in a fluid and easy language. The text is not academical, but the research is meticulous and diverse, with sections exploring essential questions, whilst others remind the reader of significant details of Jesus' life one may take for granted: "Distrusting crowds and public opinion, he spent most of his time in towns of small size and little importance" (p. 92). While Yancey could have speculated about how Jesus' ministry would have been different had it been concentrated in a major metropolis (ultimately irrelevant), his reminder of this detail shines additional light on the wonder that Jesus' ministry became a worldwide phenomenon.

== Table of Contents ==
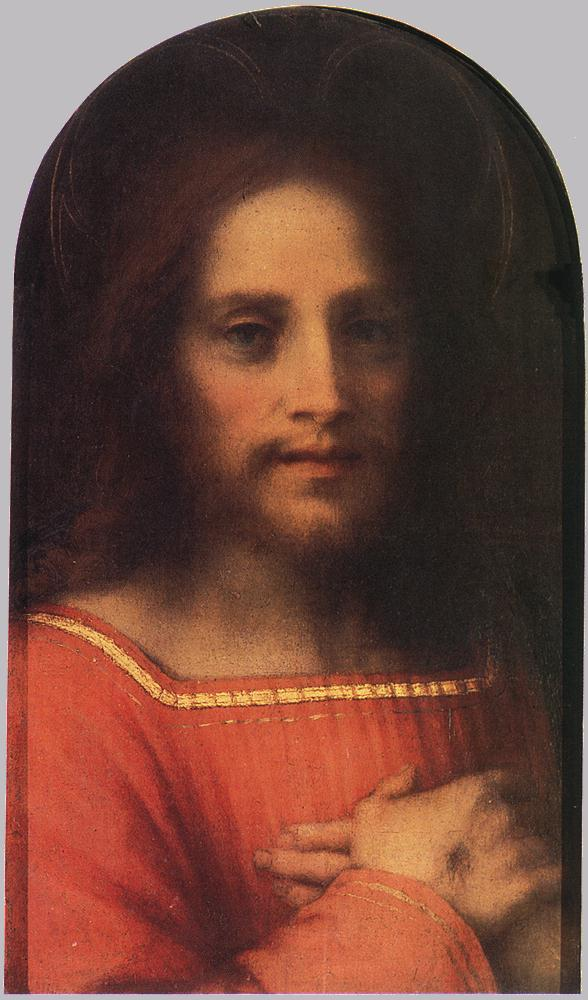
Christ the Redeemer by Andrea del Sarto

PART ONE

— Who He Was (Chapters 1-5)

PART TWO

— Why He Came (Chapters 6-11)

PART THREE

— What He Left Behind (Chapters 12-14)

== See also ==
- Jesus Christ
- Christology
- Christian Theology
- What's So Amazing About Grace?
- Views on Jesus
  - Jesuism
  - Jews for Jesus
  - Redeemer (Christianity)
  - Lost years of Jesus
- Related lists
  - List of books about Jesus
  - List of founders of religious traditions
  - List of people claimed to be Jesus
  - List of people who have been considered deities
