= Paul Brand (physician) =

British surgeon

- Born: 17 July 1914; Tamil Nadu, India
- Died: 7 July 2003 (aged 88); Seattle, Washington, US
- Education: University College Hospital, London
- Known for: Pioneering physician/surgeon in the field of leprosy
- Spouse: Margaret
- Parent(s): Jesse Brand and Evelyn "Granny" Brand

Paul Wilson Brand, CBE (17 July 1914 – 8 July 2003) was a pioneer in developing tendon transfer techniques for use in the hands of those with leprosy. He was the first physician to appreciate that leprosy is not a disease of the tissue but of the nerves: it is the loss of the sensation of pain which makes sufferers susceptible to injury and leads to tissue rotting away, especially in the extremities.

Brand contributed extensively to the fields of hand surgery and hand therapy through his publications and lectures, and wrote popular autobiographical books about his childhood, his parents' missionary work, and his philosophy about the valuable properties of pain. One of his best-known books, co-written with Christian writer Philip Yancey, is Pain: The Gift Nobody Wants (1993), republished in 1997 as The Gift of Pain.

== Early and personal life ==
He was born to missionary parents (Jesse and Evelyn "Granny" Brand) and grew up in the Kolli Hills of Tamil Nadu, India, until he was sent to the United Kingdom in 1923 for education. In his books he gives vivid descriptions of his time as a boy in India with regular bouts of dysentery and malaria in the area known as "Kolli Malai". His father died in 1929 of blackwater fever, when Brand was 15. Brand trained carpentry and then studied medicine at University College Hospital during the Second World War, later gaining his surgical qualifications whilst working as a casualty surgeon in the London Blitz. In 1944 he was appointed as a surgical officer at Great Ormond Street Hospital. He met his wife, Margaret, in medical school where she was a surgeon, specialising in ophthalmology.

He died on 8 July 2003, 9 days before his 89th birthday, at Swedish Hospital in Seattle, Washington.

== Career ==
In 1946, he was invited to join the staff of the Christian Medical College & Hospital in Vellore, India. After a visit to the Leprosy Sanatorium at Chingleput, a government institution that was at the time under church management, Brand was motivated to explore the reasons for the deformities developed in those with Hansen's disease. After careful observation and research, he came to understand that most injuries in Hansen's disease patients were a result of the pain insensitivity they experienced, and not directly caused by the Hansen's disease bacilli. He pioneered the use of dapsone as treatment for the disease. He also pioneered reconstructive surgery which transplanted tendons. In 1950, with a donation from a missionary woman, Brand established the New Life Center, Vellore, as a model rehabilitation center for Hansen's disease patients. The center was a village environment in the residential area of the Christian Medical College & Hospital campus. This helped dispel the stigma that was so prevalent even among medical professionals.

In 1964 the Brands returned to London where he worked with the Leprosy Mission; two years later they moved to the USA on invitation to take up the position of Chief of Rehabilitation Branch at the National Hansen's Disease Center at Carville, Louisiana. He worked there for 20 years and established a well-equipped and well-staffed research unit to study the complications of insensitive hands and feet, their prevention and management. His methods for prevention and management of plantar ulcers are now extensively used for treatment of patients with diabetes mellitus who have similar problems. Brand also popularised the technique of serial casting for the finger deformities (flexion contractures) that often result from Hansen's disease, a technique that is now widely used by hand therapists to treat contractures from many different hand injuries and conditions. When he retired in 1986 from the US Public Health Service, he moved to Seattle and continued his teaching work as emeritus professor of Orthopedics in the University of Washington.

During his career, Brand received many awards and honors. He was awarded the Hunterian professorship of the Royal College of Surgeons in 1952, and the Lasker Award in 1960. Queen Elizabeth honored him with a title of the Commander of the Order of the British Empire in 1961. He served as President of The Leprosy Mission International based in London and was on the Panel of Experts on leprosy of the World Health Organization. He was one of the main architects of the All-Africa Leprosy Rehabilitation and Training Center in Addis Ababa, Ethiopia, and the Schieffelin Leprosy Research and Training Center at Karigiri, India, in the Vellore district. He was an honorary member of the American Society of Hand Therapists, in recognition of his many contributions to the field. In 1966, he accepted a post as chief of rehabilitation at the public hospital in Carville, Louisiana, the only leprosy hospital in the United States. He worked there until his retirement in 1986. From 1993 to 1999, he was the President of The Leprosy Mission International, then moving to Seattle to become the clinical professor of orthopoedics, emeritus, at the University of Washington. Indias's Mahatma Gandhi Foundation selected him as the only Westerner to serve on that board...The US Public Health Service awarded him their highest award.

A biography was written on him, Ten Fingers for God by Dorothy Clarke Wilson.

His appreciation of the importance and value of pain is well described in his 1993 book with Philip Yancey, Pain: The Gift Nobody Wants. He saw pain as vital for the preservation of healthy tissue in anyone leading a normal life and he gives horrifying descriptions of the results of insensitivity in those with Hansen's disease or congenital absence of pain. He goes on to question the pursuit of pleasure in Western society and offers practical ways to ameliorate the effects of pain. The book contains a foreword by Surgeon General C. Everett Koop.

== Family ==
Brand was married to Margaret and they had six children.

== Sources ==
- Dorothy Clarke Wilson (1996) [1965]. Ten Fingers for God. McGraw-Hill Book Co. ISBN 978-0-9643137-0-5.
- Paul Brand and Philip Yancey (1980). Fearfully and Wonderfully Made. Zondervan. ISBN 0-310-35451-X.
- Paul Brand and Philip Yancey (1983). In His Image. Zondervan. ISBN 0-310-35501-X.
- Paul W. Brand (1985). Clinical Mechanics of the Hand. Mosby. ISBN 0-8016-0886-4.
- Paul Brand and Philip Yancey (1993). Pain: The Gift Nobody Wants. Zondervan. ISBN 0-310-22144-7.
- Paul Brand (1993). The Forever Feast. Vine Books. ISBN 0-89283-775-6.
- Paul Brand and Philip Yancey (1993). Fearfully and Wonderfully. Vine Books. ISBN 978 1 473 69328 9.
