= Disappointment with God =

1988 book by Philip Yancey

Disappointment with God: Three Questions No One Asks Aloud
- First edition cover
- Author: Philip Yancey
- Language: English
- Subject: Disappointment; Personal relationship with God; Theodicy
- Genre: Christian devotional literature
- Published: 1988 (Zondervan)
- Publication place: United States
- Pages: 260
- ISBN: 978-0-310-51780-1
- OCLC: 875553
- Dewey Decimal: 231.7
- LC Class: BT102.Y36 1988
- Preceded by: NIV Student Bible
- Followed by: I Was Just Wondering
- Website: http://philipyancey.com/disappointment-with-god

Disappointment with God: Three Questions No One Asks Aloud is a book written by Philip Yancey and published by Zondervan in 1988. It is one of Yancey's early bestsellers. Library Journal reviewer Elise Chase called the book "extraordinarily empathetic and persuasive; highly recommended".

Mark DeVries of The Christian Century reviewed the book and wrote that, through the book, Yancey "cuts through the pollyannaish denials that so often characterize evangelical treatment of unbelief, disappointment and unanswered prayer". The Christian Bookstore Journal listed Disappointment with God as the fifth-bestselling Christian book in 1989. In a 1991 Ministry review, Daniel Guild calls the book "Yancey at his superlative best". In 2000, Jim Remsen of The Philadelphia Inquirer called the title of the book evocative.

A 2001 article in U.S. Catholic states that Disappointment with God demonstrates Yancey's willingness to address difficult questions. In 2002, Mike Collins of the Charleston Gazette-Mail recommended the book for rape victims. In 2005, Christian apologist William Lane Craig wrote that he "enjoyed reading Disappointment with God and found much of it to be meaningful and poignant", but that he disagreed with the thesis of the book. Hong Kong film director Clement Cheng read the book and called it thought-provoking.

== Bibliography ==
- Craig, William Lane (2005). Harry Lee Poe; J. Stanley Mattson (eds.). "God, Time, and Eternity". What God Knows: Time, Eternity, and Divine Knowledge. Baylor University Press: 75–94. ISBN 9781932792126.
- Yancey, Philip (1988). Disappointment with God: Three Questions No One Asks Aloud. Zondervan. ISBN 9780310517801.
