= Phil Callaway =

Canadian humor writer and author

Phil Callaway (born July 26, 1961) is a Canadian humour writer and author. He has written more than two dozen books of family humour, children's literature, and novels, many of which are Christian-themed.

== Early life ==
Callaway was born and raised in Three Hills, Alberta, Canada, where his parents worked as staff at the Prairie Bible College. He attended Prairie High School and Prairie Bible College as a student.

== Career ==
His first two books, Honey, I Dunked the Kids (1993) and Daddy, I Blew up the Shed (1994) were based on material originally published in his column "Family Matters" in Servant Magazine. His column "Family Matters" appears in several magazines, and is translated into numerous languages including Chinese, French, German, and Norwegian.

His work is primarily Christian, and at least one review has said that he bases his humour on a religious message "that in the long run overshadows and lessens the comic message." Callaway has stated that he uses humour not just to entertain, but to inspire. "I love to make people laugh. I've seen them fall off chairs when I speak. But I also like to tell them why I'm not in a home weaving baskets somewhere and it's because of faith and hope."

He travels primarily in North America speaking approximately 100 times a year to corporations, health care conferences, and churches. He is also a frequent guest on national radio and television programs.

Callaway's speeches and books frequently discuss life's challenges. His book Laughing Matters is the story of how he battled bitterness in the wake of his wife's epilepsy. He has also written about Huntington's disease, his father's death from Alzheimer's and his mother's dementia. He told The Calgary Herald how his speaking career began. "People would call and ask me to speak. I would say, 'I can't speak but I can make you laugh. And they'd say, 'Come make us laugh.' And that's where it started."

In 2011, Callaway has produced a book on honesty, To Be Perfectly Honest, and a children's book Be Kind, Be Friendly, Be Thankful to help children deal with saying goodbye to a parent.

In January 2013 Good News Broadcasting launched Callaway's 4-minute daily radio program Laugh Again which airs in Canada and the United States.

== Religious beliefs ==
Country singer Paul Brandt interviewed Callaway on his website, asking Callaway to share his religious beliefs. He responded, "I've travelled the world, I've searched the literature. Nothing has answered my questions like the life and words of Jesus. I'm not into religion, I'm into a relationship with him. Several years ago I was in a Seattle airport washroom during an earthquake (what a place to die!). I'd been on a trip to check out a job offering three times my current salary. I'd been dreaming about a step up the ladder, about all the stuff I could buy, all the prestige I could have. But the earthquake shook me hard. (As the place shook, the guy in the stall next to me yelled, 'Did I do that?') Back on the plane, I wrote down my definition of success on an airline napkin: 'I will consider myself a success when I'm walking close to Jesus every day, when I'm building a strong marriage and performing meaningful work. I'll consider myself a success when I'm making others homesick for heaven.' That's my life mission and I can't believe how much fun I'm having following it."

== Personal life ==
Callaway married his high school sweetheart in 1982. They have three children; stories from all of their lives appear in his writing.

== Books ==
- Honey, I Dunked the Kids (1993)
- Daddy, I Blew Up the Shed (1994)
- The Total Christian Guy (1996)
- Making Life Rich Without Any Money (1998)
- Who Put The Skunk In The Trunk? (1999)
- Jake and the Scrambled Snake (2001)
- Jake and the Slippery Bank Robbers (2001)
- Jake and the Big Hairy Lie (2001)
- Jake and the Super Scary Sleepover (2001)
- Jake and the Christmas Surprise (2001)
- Jake and the Knuckle Sandwich (2001)
- Who Put My Life On Fast Forward? (2002)
- With God on the Golf Course (2003)
- Edge of the World (2004)
- Laughing Matters (2005) (updated version of Who Put the Skunk in the Trunk)
- Wonders Never Cease (2005)
- Parenting: Don't Try This at Home (2006)
- Golfing With The Master (2006)
- It's Always Darkest Before the Fridge Door Opens (2007)
- Be Kind, Be Friendly, Be Thankful (2007)
- Family Squeeze: Hope and Hilarity For A Sandwiched Generation (2008)
- I Used To Have Answers…Now I Have Kids (2010) (contains stories from Honey, I Dunked the Kids and Daddy, I Blew Up the Shed)
- Making Life Rich Without Any Money Gift Book (2011)
- To Be Perfectly Honest (2011)
- The Christian Guy Book (2013)
- When You Need A Good Laugh (2013)
- Tricks My Dog Taught Me About Life, Love, and God (2015)

== DVDs ==
- Laughing Matters
- Live Rich Without Money
- Phil Callaway Live: Learning to Laugh Again
- The Adventures of Brisky Bear and Trooper Dog

== CDs ==
The Adventures of Jake: Children's stories performed by the author
