= John Woolman =

American Quaker preacher and writer

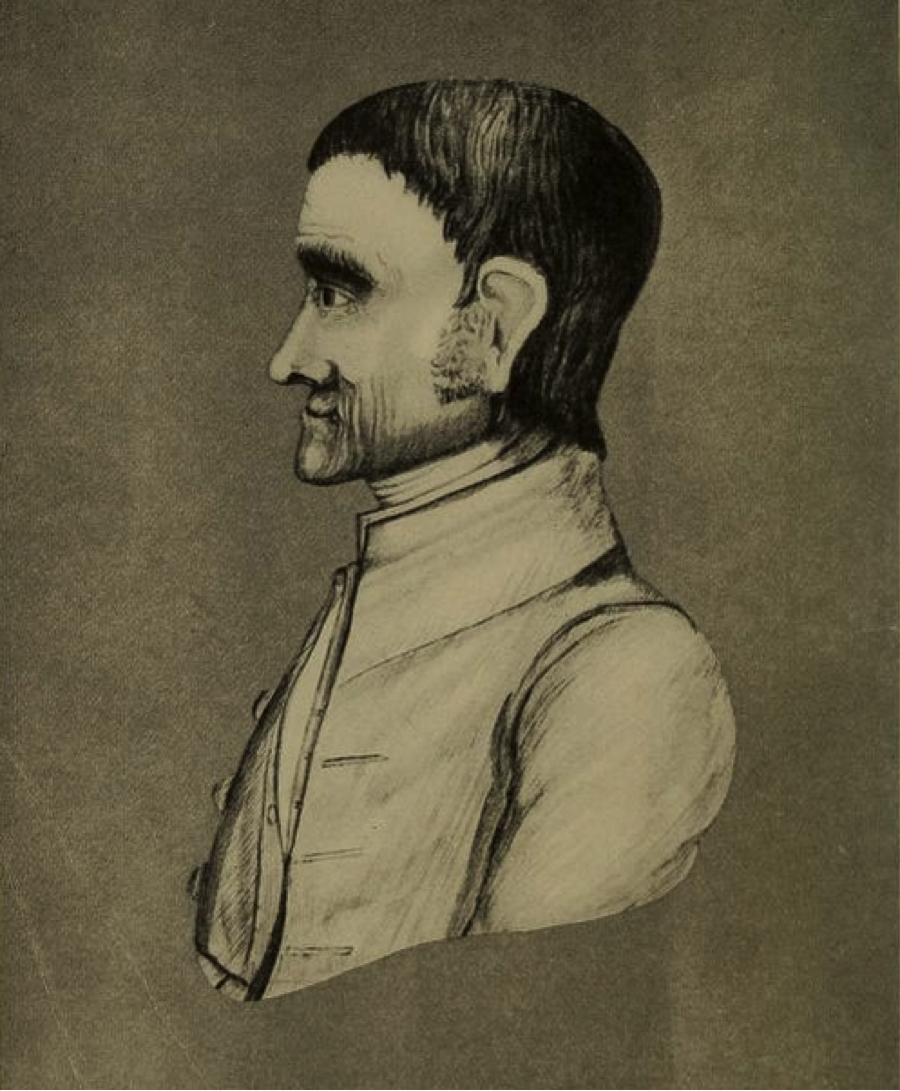
- This illustration of John Woolman, published in 1922, is based on an unsigned 18th-century sketch probably drawn from memory by Woolman's friend Robert Smith III.
- Church: Religious Society of Friends

Personal details
- Born: October 19, 1720 New Jersey, British America
- Died: October 7, 1772 (aged 51) York, Great Britain
- Buried: York, Great Britain
- Denomination: Quaker
- Spouse: Sarah Ellis (née Abbott)
- Children: 1
- Occupation: Trade

John Woolman (October 19, 1720 (O.S.)/October 30, 1720 (N.S.)– October 7, 1772) was an American merchant, tailor, journalist, Quaker preacher, and early abolitionist during the colonial era. Based in Mount Holly, New Jersey, near Philadelphia, he traveled through the American frontier to preach Quaker beliefs, and advocate against slavery and the slave trade, cruelty to animals, economic injustices and oppression, and conscription. Beginning in 1755 with the outbreak of the French and Indian War, he urged tax resistance to deny support to the colonial military. In 1772, Woolman traveled to England, where he urged Quakers to support abolition of slavery.

Woolman published numerous essays, especially against slavery. He kept a journal throughout his life; it was published posthumously, entitled The Journal of John Woolman (1774). Included in Volume I of the Harvard Classics since 1909, it is considered a prominent American spiritual work. It has also been admired for the power and clarity of its prose by non-Quakers such as the philosopher John Stuart Mill, the poet William Ellery Channing, and the essayist Charles Lamb, who urged a friend to "get the writings of John Woolman by heart." The Journal has been continuously in print since 1774, published in numerous editions; the most recent scholarly edition was published in 1989.

== Biography ==
=== Early life ===
John Woolman was born in 1720, originally from Rancocas, New Jersey, into a family who were members of the Religious Society of Friends (Quakers). His father, Samuel Woolman, was a farmer. The 150-acre Woolman farm sat on the north bank of the north branch of Rancocas Creek close to the western border of Rancocas State Park. Woolman's maternal and paternal grandparents were early Quaker settlers in Burlington County, New Jersey.

During his youth, he happened upon a robin's nest that held hatchlings. Woolman began throwing rocks at the mother robin to see if he could hit her. After killing the mother bird, he was filled with remorse, thinking of the baby birds who had no chance of survival without her. He got the nest down from the tree and quickly killed the hatchlings, believing it to be the most merciful thing to do. This experience weighed on his heart. He was inspired to love and protect all living things from then on.

Woolman married Sarah Ellis, a fellow Quaker, in a ceremony at the Chesterfield Friends Meeting, and they had a daughter whom they named Mary. His choice to lead a "life of simplicity" meant making sacrifices for his family.

=== Career ===
As a young man, Woolman began work as a clerk for a merchant. When he was 23, his employer asked him to write a bill of sale for an enslaved person. Though he told his employer that he thought that slaveholding was inconsistent with Christianity, he wrote the bill of sale.

By the age of 26, he had become an independent and successful tradesman. He refused to write the part of another customer's will which would have bequeathed or transferred the ownership of a slave, and instead convinced the owner to set the enslaved person free by manumission. Many Friends (fellow Quakers) believed that slavery was a sin. Other Friends kept slaves but considered trading in slaves to be sinful.

Woolman eventually retired from business (i.e., "merchandising") because he viewed profit-making as distracting from his religion. He wrote that he took up the trade of tailor in order to have more free time to travel and witness to fellow Quakers about his concerns.

=== Testimony of Simplicity ===
Woolman was committed to the Friends' Testimony of Simplicity. While in his 20s, he decided that the retail trade demanded too much of his time. He believed he had a calling to preach "truth and light" among Friends and others. In his Journal, he said that he quit the shop as it was "attended with much outward care and cumber," that his "mind was weaned from the desire of outward greatness," and that "where the heart is set on greatness, success in business did not satisfy the craving." Woolman gave up his career as a tradesman and supported himself as a tailor; he also maintained a productive orchard.

He addressed issues of economic injustice and oppression in his Journal and other writings, and knew international trade had local effects. Despite supporting himself as a tailor, Woolman refused to use or wear dyed fabrics, because he had learned that many workers in the dye industry were poisoned by some of the noxious substances used. He is quoted as saying, "May we look upon our treasures, the furniture of our houses, and our garments, and try whether the seeds of war have nourishment in these our possessions."

Woolman decided to minister to Friends and others in remote areas on the frontier. In 1746, he went on his first ministry trip with Isaac Andrews. They traveled about 1500 miles round-trip in three months, going as far south as North Carolina. He preached on many topics, including slavery, during this and other such trips.

=== Anti-slavery activities ===
In 1754 Woolman published Some Considerations on the Keeping of Negroes. He continued to refuse to draw up wills that bequeathed ownership of slaves to heirs. Over time, and working on a personal level, he individually convinced many Quaker slaveholders to free their slaves. As Woolman traveled, when he accepted hospitality from a slaveholder, he insisted on paying the slaves for their work in attending him. He refused to be served with silver cups, plates, and utensils, as he believed that slaves in other regions were forced to dig such precious minerals and gems for the rich. He observed that some owners used the labor of their slaves to enjoy lives of ease, which he found to be the worst situation not only for the slaves but for the moral and spiritual condition of the owners. He could condone those owners who treated their slaves gently or worked alongside them.

Woolman worked within the Friends' tradition of seeking the guidance of the Spirit of Christ and patiently waiting to achieve unity in the Spirit. As he went from one Friends’ meeting to another, he expressed his concern about slaveholding. Gradually various Quaker Meetings began to see the evils of slavery; their minutes increasingly reflecting their condemnation of the practice. Quaker records bear witness to his and a few others' success – by the time the 1776–1783 revolution was over, almost all North American Quakers had freed their slaves, and those few Quakers who had been engaged in the trading or shipment of slaves had ceased such activities as well.

=== Testimony of Peace ===
He lived out the Friends' Peace Testimony by protesting the French and Indian War (1754–1763), the North American front of the Seven Years' War. In 1755, he decided to oppose paying those colonial taxes that supported the war and urged tax resistance among fellow Quakers in the Philadelphia Meeting, even at a time when American settlers on the frontier were being raided by French and allied Native Americans. Some Quakers joined him in his protest, and the Meeting sent a letter on this issue to other groups. In one of his prophetic dreams, recorded in his Journal, Woolman negotiated between two heads of state in an effort to prevent an outbreak of war.

=== Animal welfare ===
Woolman was an advocate of animal welfare. He was not vegan or vegetarian, as he did eat meat. He opposed the overworking of draft animals and avoided stage-coaches as he believed the horses were abused. Woolman commented that "true religion consisted in an inward life, wherein the heart doth love and reverence God the Creator, and learns to exercise true justice and goodness not only toward all men, but also toward the brute creatures."

=== Final days ===
Woolman's final journey was to England in 1772. During the voyage he stayed in steerage and spent time with the crew, rather than in the better accommodations enjoyed by some passengers. He attended the British London Yearly Meeting. The Friends resolved to include an abolitionist statement in their Epistle (a type of letter sent to Quakers in other places). Woolman traveled to York, but he had contracted smallpox and died there. He was buried in York on October 9, 1772.

There is strong doubt whether the portrait shown here (and very often elsewhere) can be of John Woolman. There is no known depiction of John Woolman but the authentic silhouette of his brother Uriah shows a very different face to this elderly, wizened subject.

== Published works ==
Essays

- "Some Considerations on the Keeping of Negroes", 1753
- "Some Considerations on Keeping Negroes, Part Second", 1762
- "Considerations on Pure Wisdom and Human Policy, on Labor, on Schools, and on the Right Use of the Lord's Outward Gifts", 1768
- "Considerations on the True Harmony of Mankind, and How it is to be Maintained", 1770

Books

- The Journal of John Woolman, published posthumously in 1774 by Joseph Crukshank, a Philadelphia Quaker printer. Several subsequent editions are available, including the respected Whittier edition of 1871. The modern standard scholarly edition is The Journal and Major Essays of John Woolman, ed., Phillips P. Moulton, Friends United Press, 1989.
- Serious Considerations on Various Subjects of Importance by John Woolman, of Mount-Holly, New-Jersey, with some of his dying expressions, published posthumously in 1805 by Collins, Perkins and Co., New York.
- Gummere, Amelia Mott (1922). The Journal and Essays of John Woolman. New York: The Macmillan Company.
- Proud, James, ed. (2010). John Woolman and the Affairs of Truth: the Journalist's Essays, Epistles, and Ephemera. San Francisco, CA: Inner Light Books

== Legacy and honors ==
In his lifetime, Woolman did not succeed in eradicating slavery even within the Society of Friends in colonial America. However, his personal efforts helped change Quaker viewpoints during the period of the Great Awakening. In 1790, after the American Revolutionary War, the Pennsylvania Society of Friends petitioned the United States Congress for the abolition of slavery. While unsuccessful at the national level, Quakers contributed to Pennsylvania's abolition of slavery. In addition, in the first two decades after the war, they were active together with Methodist and Baptist preachers in the Upper South in persuading many slaveholders to manumit their slaves. The percentage of free people of color rose markedly during those decades, for instance, from less than one to nearly ten percent in Virginia.

- The "fair treatment of people of all races" is today an integral part of the Friends' Testimony of Equality.

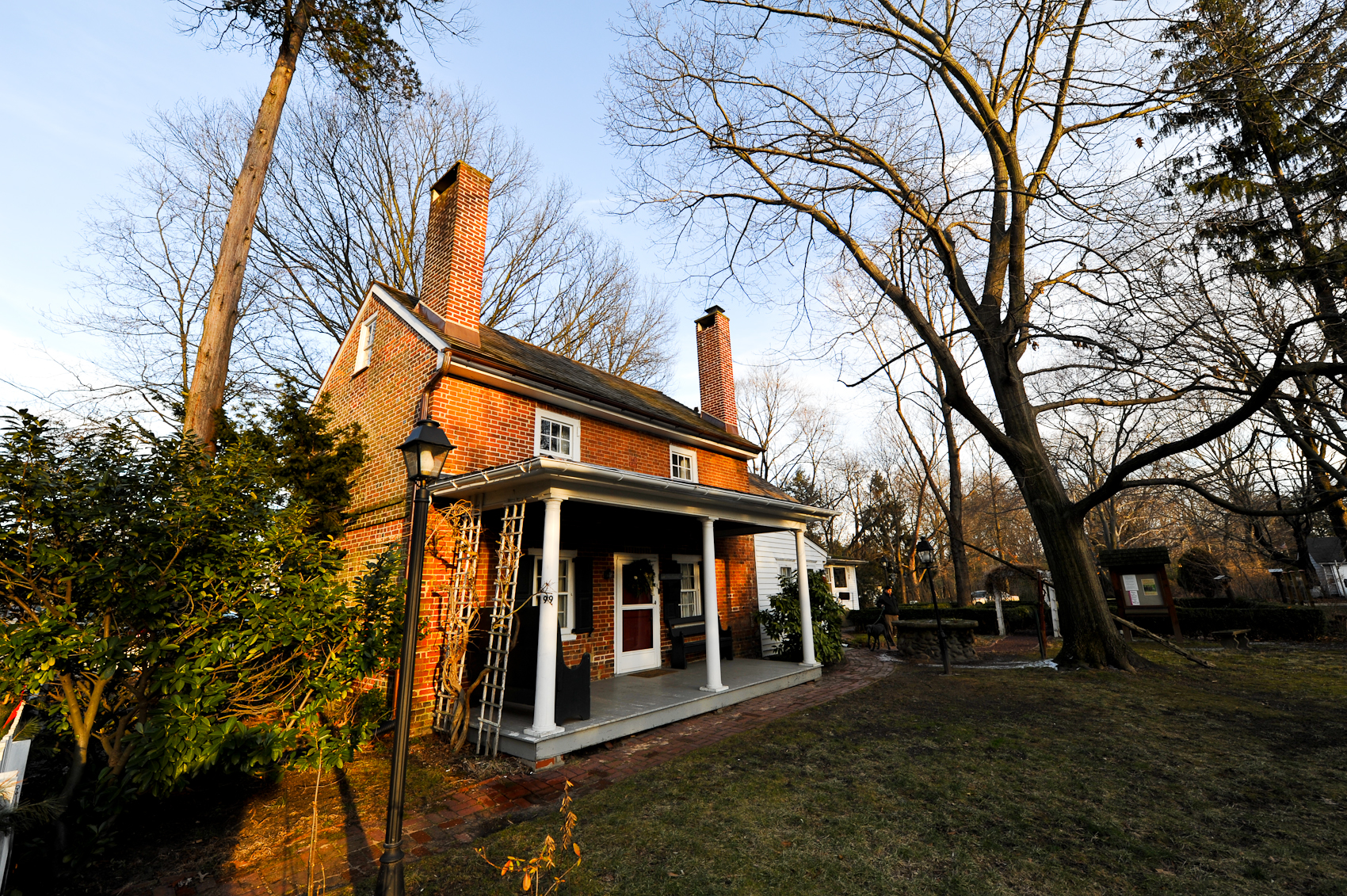
The John Woolman Memorial, 99 Branch St., Mount Holly, New Jersey (39.999000°N 74.776875°W)

- The Journal of John Woolman has been included since the first year of publication in 1909 in Volume I of The Harvard Classics, together with Benjamin Franklin's His Autobiography and William Penn's Fruits of Solitude. This was published by P.F. Collier and Sons of New York. Woolman's Journal is considered a prominent American spiritual work and is the longest-published book in the history of North America other than the Bible, having been continuously in print since 1774.
- The John Woolman Memorial Association was formed in Mount Holly to promote his teachings. It sponsors an annual lecture and has published a volume of Woolman genealogy, with additional volumes planned.
- The John Woolman Memorial in Mount Holly, New Jersey is located near one of his former orchards. A brick house built between 1771 and 1783, reportedly for one of Woolman's daughters and her husband, it is operated as a house museum and memorial. The Memorial's parent organization also compiles an ongoing genealogical study of Woolman's descendants; notable among them are actor Christopher Reeve and Collett Everman Woolman, a pioneer and innovator of air mail and aerial crop-dusting, and founder of Delta Air Lines.
- 1963, the John Woolman School was founded in his honor in Nevada City, California as a college-preparatory boarding school, serving students in grades 10–12.
- The Woolman Institute was established at Wilmington College during the 1980s.
- 2003, a group of scholars of peace and justice studies founded the John Woolman College of Active Peace, which seeks to 'mainstream' many Quaker (and other) concepts of peace and peacemaking into higher education.
- The John Woolman room at Friends House, London, UK is named after him.

== See also ==
- List of abolitionist forerunners
