= Soul Survivor (book) =

2001 book by Philip Yancey

- First edition cover
- Author: Philip Yancey
- Language: English
- Subject: Spiritual direction
- Genre: Spiritual autobiography
- Published: 2001 (Doubleday)
- Publication place: United States
- Pages: 336
- ISBN: 978-0-385-50274-0
- OCLC: 48019553
- Dewey Decimal: 270/.092/2
- LC Class: BR1700.2.Y36 2001
- Preceded by: Meet the Bible
- Followed by: Church
- Website: http://philipyancey.com/soul-survivor

Soul Survivor (variously published with the subtitles How My Faith Survived the Church, Searching for Meaningful Faith, and How Thirteen Unlikely Mentors Helped My Faith Survive the Church) is a spiritual autobiography by Philip Yancey, a prominent Christianity Today columnist. With the subtitle How My Faith Survived the Church, the book was published in 2001 by Doubleday, which marketed it as a mainstream book. A five-hour-long, three-audio-cassette audiobook edition read by Yancey was also released that year with the same subtitle. In the United Kingdom, the book was published by Hodder & Stoughton with the subtitle Searching for Meaningful Faith. Random House published a paperback edition in 2003 with the subtitle How Thirteen Unlikely Mentors Helped My Faith Survive the Church.

In the book, Yancey profiles thirteen authors who helped him in his Christian faith. Almost all of the authors were Christians themselves, but most were outside Yancey's own evangelical tradition. They are: Paul Brand, Frederick Buechner, G. K. Chesterton, Robert Coles, Annie Dillard, John Donne, Fyodor Dostoevsky, Shusaku Endo, Mahatma Gandhi, Martin Luther King Jr., C. Everett Koop, Henri Nouwen, and Leo Tolstoy.

G. Scott Morris, founder of the Memphis, Tennessee-based Church Health Center, read Soul Survivor and felt that he could identify with the personal experiences Yancey discusses in the book, so Morris asked Yancey to come to Memphis to speak at a Church Health Center event, and Yancey accepted. Atlanta Journal-Constitution reviewer John Blake wrote that, although Yancey had written in his previous books about the judgmentalism he experienced in his local church while growing up, the discussion had never been as personal as in Soul Survivor. Iain Sharp of The Sunday Star-Times called the book "an eye-opening, informative and surprisingly entertaining collection of essays, no matter what your personal philosophy is". In a Booklist review, Ray Olson argues that Yancey's writing of Soul Survivor demonstrates the author's compassion and literary skill. In October 2001, Soul Survivor was identified as one of the ten books about religion that Booklist had reviewed most favorably in the preceding twelve months. The Christian Century reviewer Wayne Holst called Soul Survivor "a thoughtful reflection on the faith journey of an intelligent, influential writer".

== Bibliography ==
- Yancey, Philip (2001). Soul Survivor: How My Faith Survived the Church. Doubleday. ISBN 978-0-385-50274-0.
- Yancey, Philip (2001). Soul Survivor: Searching for Meaningful Faith. Hodder & Stoughton. ISBN 978-0-340-78600-0.
- Yancey, Philip (2003). Soul Survivor: How Thirteen Unlikely Mentors Helped My Faith Survive the Church. Random House. ISBN 978-1-57856-818-5.
