= Presbyterian Record =

- Categories: Christianity
- Frequency: Monthly
- First issue: January 1876; 150 years ago
- Final issue: December 2016
- Company: Presbyterian Record Inc.
- Country: Canada
- Based in: Toronto, Ontario
- Language: English
- Website: Presbyterian Record at the Wayback Machine (archived March 16, 2016)
- ISSN: 0032-7573

The Presbyterian Record was a monthly periodical published by Presbyterian Record Inc. primarily for members of the Presbyterian Church in Canada. The magazine was published between January 1876 and January 2017.

== History and profile ==
It was published monthly, starting with the January 1876 merger of The Presbyterian (1848–1875) of the Church of Scotland Canadian Synod, and the Home and Foreign Record of the Canada Presbyterian Church, (1861–1875) the latter coming from the 1861 merger of the Free Church and United Presbyterian Church of Canada's Canadian publications, The Ecclesiastical and missionary record for the Presbyterian Church of Canada (in connection with the Free Church of Scotland) (printed since 1844, under the leadership and Editorship of Rev. Alexander Gale, Rev. William Rintoul, Mr. John Burns and Rev. William Reid) and The Canadian Presbyterian magazine; especially devoted to the interests of the United Presbyterian Church.

In 2000, an independent corporation was created to publish the Presbyterian Record. In 2002, the board appointed of David Harris, a career journalist and Anglican priest, as publisher and editor. In 1975, when the denomination numbered almost 172,000 members, the Record had a circulation of over 88,000, but both membership and circulation declined in the years that followed. By 2014, membership in the denomination had declined to 93,500 and circulation had fallen to 14,000. In September, 2016, citing declining circulation mirroring declining membership of the denomination, the board of directors decided that the December 2016 issue would be the magazine's last. In 2017 the denomination launched a quarterly newspaper called Presbyterian Connection and a monthly publication called PCConnect Monthly E-Newsletter.

== Editors ==
- James Croil, esq., 1876-1891 (formerly of The Presbyterian)
- Rev. Dr. Ephraim Scott 1892-1926
- Rev. William Rochester 1927-1945
- Rev. Dr. John McNab 1946-1957
- Rev. Dr. DeCourcy Rayner 1958-1977
- Rev. Dr. James Ross Dickey 1978-1988
- Rev. Dr. John Congram, 1988–2002
- Rev. David Harris, 2002-2016
