= Philip Yancey =

American author (born 1949)

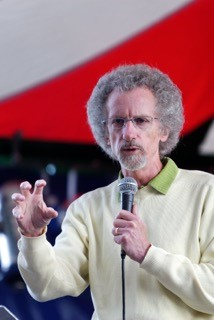
- Yancey speaking at the 2008 Greenbelt Festival in England
- Born: November 4, 1949 (age 77)
- Occupation: Author
- Years active: 1971–2026
- Spouse: Janet Norwood (m. 1970)

Philip David Yancey (born November 4, 1949) is a retired American Christian author known for his works about spiritual issues. His books have sold more than 15 million copies in English and have been translated into 40 languages, making him one of the best-selling contemporary Christian authors. Two of his books won the ECPA's Christian Book of the Year Award: The Jesus I Never Knew in 1996, and What's So Amazing About Grace? in 1998. He was published by Hachette, HarperCollins Christian Publishing, InterVarsity Press, Rabbit Room Press, and Penguin Random House.

== Life and career ==
Yancey was born in Atlanta to Marshall Watts (1927–1950) and Mildred Sylvania (née Diem) Yancey (1924–2023) and grew up in nearby suburbs. He has an older brother, also named Marshall. When he was one year old, his preacher father, stricken with polio, died after church members suggested he go off life support in faith that God would heal him. This and other negative experiences with a rigid, conservative, fundamentalist church background contributed to Yancey's losing his faith at one point and deeply questioning the established church at other times. After high school he attended Columbia Bible College in South Carolina, where he met his wife, Janet. He went on to earn graduate degrees in communications and English from Wheaton College Graduate School and the University of Chicago.

While living in the Chicago, Illinois suburbs, in 1971 Yancey joined the staff of Campus Life magazine—a publication directed towards high school and college students—where he served as editor for eight years. For three decades Yancey contributed as an editor-at-large, for Christianity Today, and also wrote articles for publications including Reader's Digest, The Saturday Evening Post, Publishers Weekly,The Atlantic, Chicago Magazine, Christian Century, and National Wildlife.

As a journalist, he has interviewed two U.S. presidents and other notable people such as Bono, Billy Graham, and the authors Annie Dillard, John Updike, and Henri Nouwen. Former president Jimmy Carter called Yancey "my favorite modern author".

== Personal life ==
Yancey lives in Colorado with his wife Janet, who he married in 1970. Over the course of his writing and speaking career, he visited over 85 countries.

Yancey suffered a broken neck in a motor vehicle accident in February 2007 but recovered. In August that year he completed his goal of climbing all 53 of Colorado's 14,000-foot (4,300 m)-plus peaks, the final three after his accident. In the fall of 2022, he was diagnosed with Parkinson's disease. He later described Parkinson's as "the gift I didn’t want."

In a statement emailed to Christianity Today on January 6, 2026, Yancey confessed that he had engaged in a "sinful affair" with a married woman for eight years and would retire from writing and speaking. "Having disqualified myself from Christian ministry, I am therefore retiring from writing, speaking, and social media. Instead, I need to spend my remaining years living up to the words I have already written. I pray for God’s grace and forgiveness—as well as yours—and for healing in the lives of those I’ve wounded," Yancey said in the statement.

== Bibliography ==
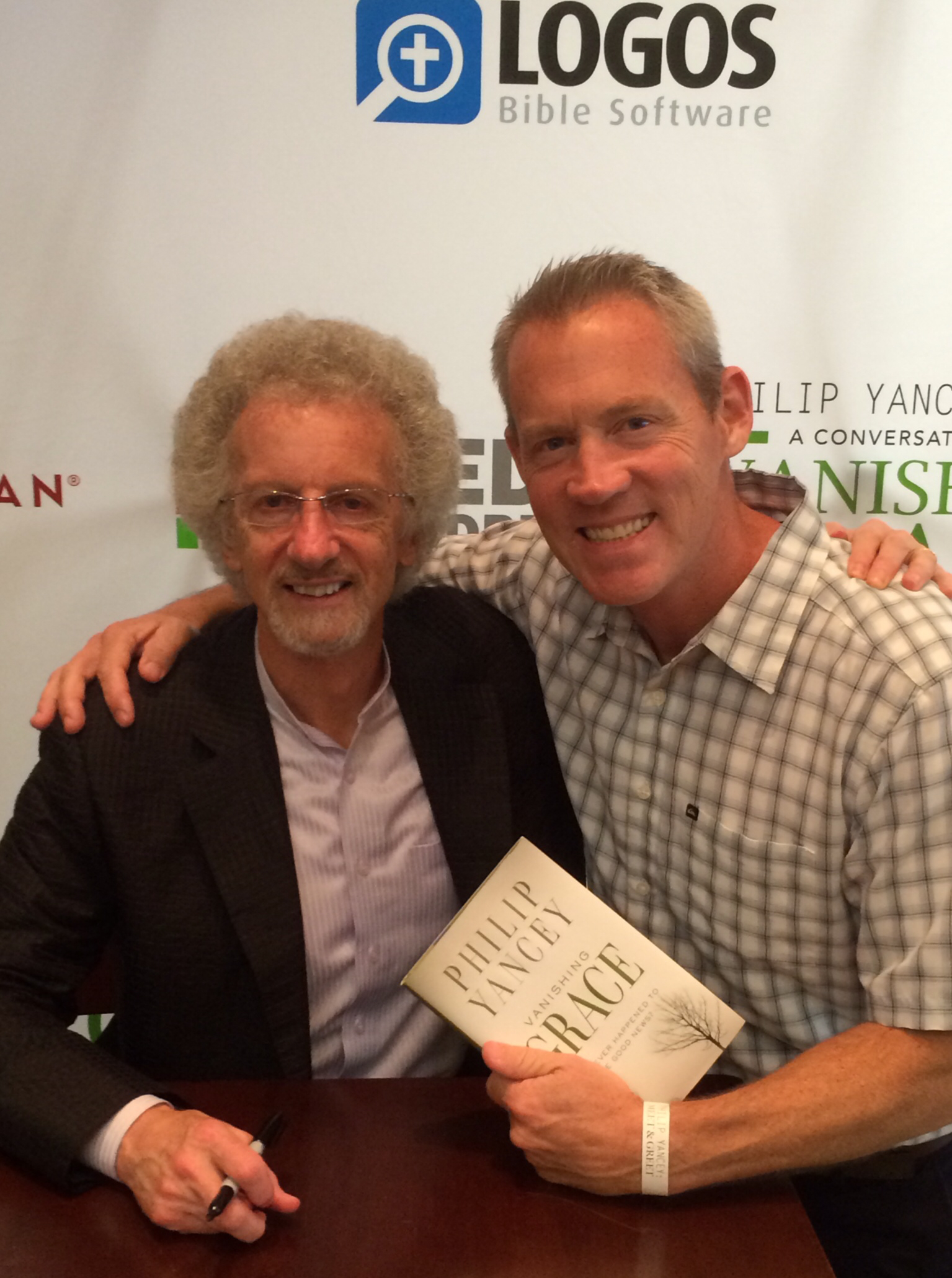
Yancey (left) has written many books, including Vanishing Grace

- After the Wedding (1976)
- Where Is God When It Hurts? (1977) Gold Medallion Book Award (updated edition published in 1990, special edition in 2001), ISBN 0-310-35411-0
- Secrets of the Christian Life (1979) (co-authored with Tim Stafford and first published as 'Unhappy Secrets of the Christian Life'), ISBN 0-310-35481-1
- Fearfully and Wonderfully Made (1980) – co-authored with physician Paul W. Brand; Gold Medallion Book Award; ISBN 0-310-35451-X
- Open Windows (1982), ISBN 0-8407-5960-6
- Insight (1982)
- In His Image (1984) – co-authored with physician Paul W. Brand; Gold Medallion Book Award; ISBN 0-310-35501-X
- NIV Student Bible (1986) – co-edited with Tim Stafford; Gold Medallion Book Award; ISBN 0-310-92664-5
- Disappointment with God (1988); Gold Medallion Book Award; Christianity Today's Book of the Year; ISBN 0-310-51780-X
- I Was Just Wondering (1989) – excerpts from previous books and article ISBN 0-86347-460-8
- A Guided Tour of the Bible: 6 Months of Daily Readings (1989), ISBN 0-310-51650-1
- Praying with the KGB: A Startling Report from a Shattered Empire (1992) – ISBN 0-88070-511-6
- Discovering God: A Devotional Journey Through the Bible (1993)
- Pain: The Gift Nobody Wants (1993) – co-authored with physician Paul W. Brand; reissued in 1997 as The Gift of Pain; Gold Medallion Book Award; ISBN 0-06-017020-4
- The Jesus I Never Knew (1995) – Gold Medallion Book Award and ECPA Christian Book of the Year; ISBN 0-310-38570-9
- Finding God in Unexpected Places (1995) (updated 2nd edition published in 2005) – ISBN 0-385-51309-7
- What's So Amazing About Grace? (1997) Gold Medallion Book Award and ECPA Christian Book of the Year; ISBN 0-310-21327-4
- The Bible Jesus Read (1999) – Gold Medallion Book Award; ISBN 0-310-22834-4
- Reaching for the Invisible God (2000) – ISBN 0-310-23531-6
- Meet the Bible: A Panorama of God's Word in 366 Daily Readings and Reflections (2000) – co-authored with Brenda Quinn
- Soul Survivor: How My Faith Survived the Church (2001) – ISBN 978-0-385-50274-0
- Church: Why Bother?: My Personal Pilgrimage (2001) – Gold Medallion Book Award; ISBN 0-310-20200-0
- Rumors of Another World (2003) – renamed as A Skeptic's Guide to Faith (2009), ISBN 978-0-310-32502-4
- In the Likeness of God (2004) – The Dr. Paul Brand tribute edition of Fearfully and Wonderfully Made and In His Image, ISBN 0-310-25742-5
- Designer Sex (2005) – 32-page booklet, ISBN 978-0877840442
- Finding God in Unexpected Places: Revised Edition – Doubleday, 2005
- When We Hurt : Prayer, Preparation & Hope for Life's Pain (2006)
- Prayer: Does It Make Any Difference? (2006) – ISBN 978-0-310-27105-5
- What Good Is God? (2010) – ISBN 978-0-446-55985-0
- The Question That Never Goes Away (2014) – ISBN 978-0310339823
- Vanishing Grace: Bringing Good News to a Deeply Divided World (2014) – ISBN 978-0310351542
- Fearfully and Wonderfully: The Marvel of Bearing God’s Image (2019) – ISBN 978-0830845705
- A Companion in Crisis: A Modern Paraphrase of John Donne’s Devotions (2021) – ISBN 978-1947360884
- Where the Light Fell: A Memoir (2021) – ISBN 978-0593238509
- Undone: A Modern Rendering of John Donne's Devotions (2023) – ISBN 978-1951872175
- What Went Wrong: Russia's Lost Opportunity and the Path to Ukraine (2024) – ISBN 978-1666747973
