= Weed =

Plant considered undesirable in a particular place or situation

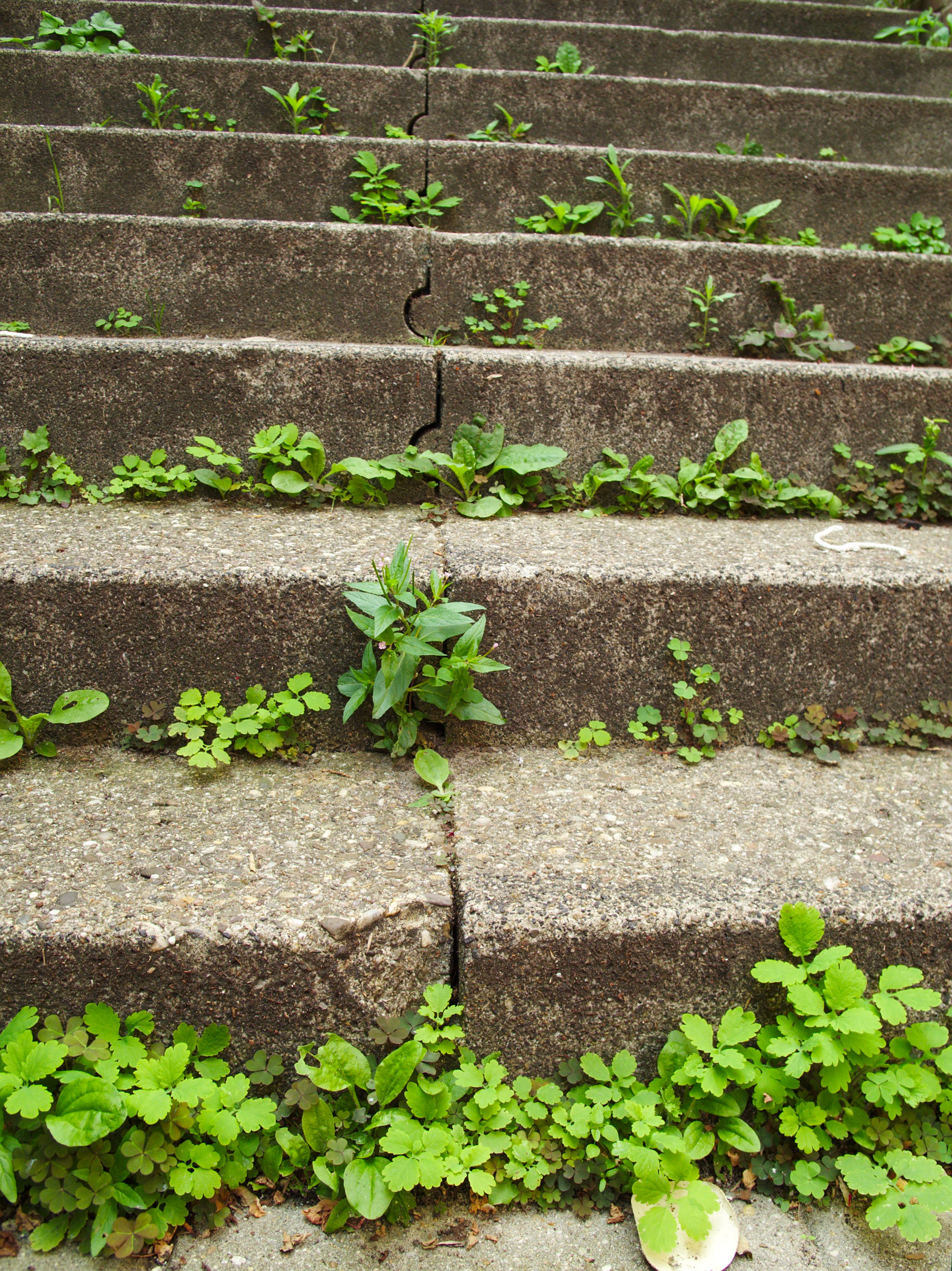
Weeds growing in the cracks of a concrete staircase (Epilobium roseum, Chelidonium majus, Oxalis corniculata, Plantago major)

A weed is a plant considered undesirable in a particular situation, growing where it conflicts with human preferences, needs, or goals. Plants with characteristics that make them hazardous, aesthetically unappealing, difficult to control in managed environments, or otherwise unwanted in farm land, orchards, gardens, lawns, parks, recreational spaces, residential and industrial areas, may all be considered weeds. The concept of weeds is particularly significant in agriculture, where the presence of weeds in fields used to grow crops may cause major losses in yields. Invasive species, plants introduced to an environment where their presence negatively impacts the overall functioning and biodiversity of the ecosystem, may also sometimes be considered weeds.

Taxonomically, the term "weed" has no botanical significance, because a plant that is a weed in one context, is not a weed when growing in a situation where it is wanted. Some plants that are widely regarded as weeds are intentionally grown in gardens and other cultivated settings. For this reason, some plants are sometimes called beneficial weeds. Similarly, volunteer plants from a previous crop are regarded as weeds when growing in a subsequent crop. Thus, alternative nomenclature for the same plants might be hardy pioneers, cosmopolitan species, volunteers, "spontaneous urban vegetation," etc.

Although whether a plant is a weed depends on context, plants commonly defined as weeds broadly share biological characteristics that allow them to thrive in disturbed environments and to be particularly difficult to destroy or eradicate. In particular, weeds are adapted to thrive under human management in the same way as intentionally grown plants. Since the origins of agriculture on Earth, agricultural weeds have co-evolved with human crops and agricultural systems, and some have been domesticated into crops themselves after their fitness in agricultural settings became apparent.

More broadly, the term "weed" is occasionally applied pejoratively to species outside the plant kingdom, species that can survive in diverse environments and reproduce quickly; in this sense it has even been applied to humans.

Weed control is important in agriculture and horticulture. Methods include hand cultivation with hoes, powered cultivation with cultivators, smothering with mulch or soil solarization, lethal wilting with high heat, burning, or chemical attack with herbicides and cultural methods such as crop rotation and fallowing land to reduce the weed population.

== History ==
It has long been assumed that weeds, in the sense of rapidly evolving plants taking advantage of human-disturbed environments, evolved in response to the Neolithic agricultural revolution approximately 12,000 years ago. However, researchers have found evidence of "proto-weeds" behaving in similar ways at Ohalo II, a 23,000-year-old archeological site in Israel.

The idea of "weeds" as a category of undesirable plant has not been universal throughout history. Before 1200 A.D., little evidence exists of concern with weed control or of agricultural practices solely intended to control weeds. A possible reason for this is that for much of human history, women and children were an abundant source of cheap labor to control weeds, and not directly acknowledged. Weeds are assumed to have existed since the beginning of agriculture, and accepted as an "inevitable nuisance."

Though the plants are not named using a specific term denoting a "weed" in the contemporary sense, plants that may be interpreted as "weeds" are referenced in the Bible:

Cursed is the ground because of you; through painful toil you will eat of it all the days of your life. It will produce thorns and thistles for you, and you will eat the plants of the field. By the sweat of your brow you will eat your food until you return to the ground.

Some early Roman writers referenced weeding activities in agricultural fields, but weed control in the pre-modern era was probably an incidental effect of plowing. Ancient Egyptians, Assyrians, and Sumerians had no specific word for "weeds," seeing all plants as having some use. The English word "weed" can be traced back to the Old English weod, which refers to woad, rather than a category of plant as in the modern usage; in early medieval European herbals, each plant is regarded as having its own "virtues".

By the sixteenth century, the concept of a "weed" was better defined as a "noxious" or undesirable type of plant, as referenced metaphorically in William Shakespeare's works. An example of a Shakespearean reference to weeds is found in Sonnet 69:

To thy fair flower add the rank smell of weeds: / But why thy odour matcheth not thy show, / The soil is this, that thou dost common grow.

In London during this period, poor women were paid low wages to weed gardens and courtyards.

After the Reformation, Christian theology that emphasized the degradation of nature after the Fall of Man, and humankind's role and duty to dominate and subdue nature, became more developed and widespread. Various European writers designated certain plants as "vermin" and "filth," though many plants identified as such were valued by gardeners or by herbalists and apothecaries, and some questioned the idea that any plant could be without purpose or value. Laws mandating the control of weeds emerged as early as the seventeenth century; in 1691 a law in New York required the removal of "poysonous and Stincking Weeds" in front of houses.

In the nineteenth century, manual labor was used to control weeds in European towns and cities, and chemical methods of weed control emerged. For example, a French journal in 1831 documented a mixture of sulfur, lime and water boiled in an iron cauldron as an effective herbicide to prevent grass from growing among cobblestones.

The cultural association between weeds and moral or spiritual degradation persisted into the last nineteenth century in American cities. Urban expansion and development created ideal habitats for weeds in nineteenth-century America. Reformers consequently saw weeds as a part of the larger problem of filth, disease, and moral corruption that plagued the urban environments, and weeds were seen as refuge for "tramps" and other criminal or undesirable people. The St. Louis Post-Dispatch credited weeds as causing diphtheria, scarlet fever, and typhoid. In St. Louis between the years of 1905-1910, weeds became viewed as a major public health hazard, believed to cause typhoid and malaria, and legal precedents were set in order to control weeds that would help facilitate the adoption of weed control laws throughout the country.

== Ecological significance ==
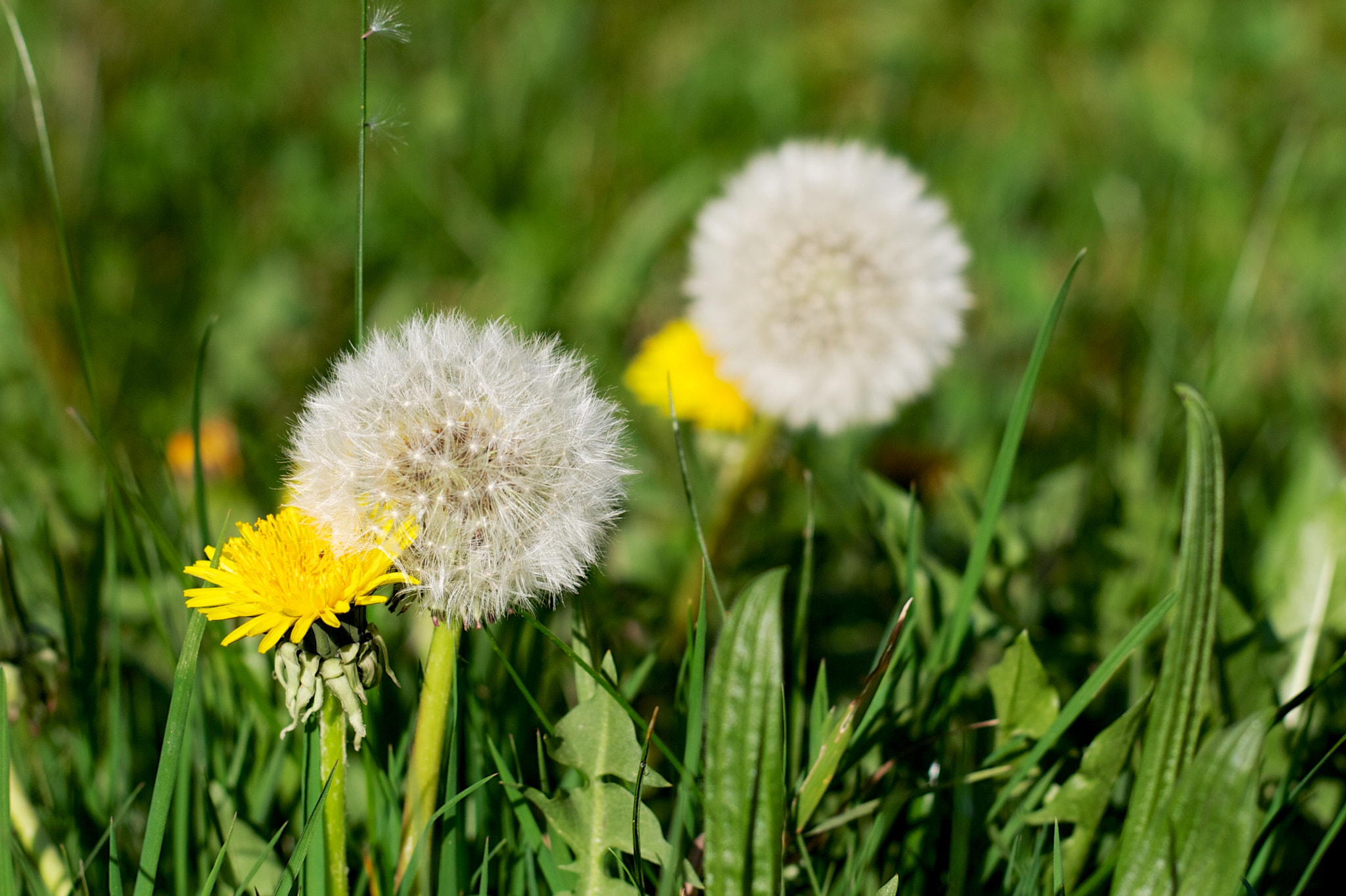
A dandelion is a common plant all over the world, especially in Europe, Asia, and the Americas. It is considered a weed in some contexts (such as lawns) but not others (such as when it is grown as a vegetable or herbal medicine).

"Weed" as a category of plant overlaps with the closely related concepts of ruderal and pioneer species. Pioneer species are specifically adapted to disturbed environments, where the existing plant and soil community has been disrupted or damaged in some way. Adaptation to disturbance can give weeds advantages over desirable crops, pastures, or ornamental plants. The nature of the habitat and its disturbances will affect or even determine which types of weed communities become dominant. In weed ecology some authorities speak of the relationship between "the three Ps": plant, place, perception. These have been very variously defined, but the weed traits listed by H.G. Baker are widely cited.

Examples of such ruderal or pioneer species include plants that are adapted to naturally occurring disturbed environments such as dunes and other windswept areas with shifting soils, alluvial flood plains, river banks and deltas, and areas that are burned repeatedly. Since human agricultural and horticultural practices often mimic these natural disturbances that weedy species have adapted for, some weeds are effectively preadapted to grow and proliferate in human-disturbed areas such as agricultural fields, lawns, gardens, roadsides, and construction sites. As agricultural practices continue and develop, weeds evolve further, with humans exerting evolutionary pressure upon weeds through manipulating their habitat and attempting to control weed populations.

Due to their ability to survive and thrive in conditions challenging or hostile to other plants, weeds have been considered extremophiles.

=== Adaptability ===
Due to their evolutionary heritage as disturbance-adapted pioneers, most weeds exhibit incredibly high phenotype plasticity, meaning that individual plants hold the potential to adapt their morphology, growth, and appearance in response to their conditions. The potential within a single individual to adapt to a wide variety of conditions is sometimes referred to as an "all-purpose genotype." Disturbance-adapted plants typically grow rapidly and reproduce quickly, with some annual weeds having multiple generations in a single growing season. They commonly have seeds that persist in the soil seed bank for many years. Perennial weeds often have underground stems that spread under the soil surface or, like ground ivy (Glechoma hederacea), have creeping stems that root and spread out over the ground. These traits make many disturbance-adapted plants highly successful as weeds.

On top of the ability of individual plants to adapt to their conditions, weed populations also evolve much more quickly than older models of evolution account for. Once established in an agricultural setting, weeds have been observed to undergo evolutionary changes to adapt to selective pressures imposed by human management. Some examples include changes in seed dormancy, changes in seasonal life cycles, changes in plant morphology, and the evolution of resistance to herbicides. Rapid life cycles, large populations, and ability to spread large numbers of seeds long distances also allow weed species with these general characteristics to evolve quickly.

=== Dispersal ===
The concept of weeds also overlaps with the concept of invasive species, both in the sense that human activities tend to introduce weeds outside their native range, and that an introduced species may be considered a weed. Many weed species have moved out of their natural geographic ranges and spread around the world in tandem with human migrations and commerce. Weed seeds are often collected and transported with crops after the harvesting of grains, so humans are a vector of transport as well as a producer of the disturbed environments to which weed species are well adapted, resulting in many weeds having a close association with human activities.

Some plants become dominant when introduced into new environments because the animals and plants in their original environment that compete with them or feed on them are absent; in what is sometimes called the "natural enemies hypothesis", plants freed from these specialist consumers may become dominant. An example is Klamath weed, which threatened millions of hectares of prime grain and grazing land in North America after it was accidentally introduced. The Klamathweed Beetle, a species that specializes in consuming the plant, was imported during World War II. Within several years Klamath weed was reduced to a rare roadside weed. In locations where predation and mutually competitive relationships are absent, weeds have increased resources available for growth and reproduction. The weediness of some species that are introduced into new environments may be caused by their production of allelopathic chemicals which indigenous plants are not yet adapted to, a scenario sometimes called the "novel weapons hypothesis". These chemicals may limit the growth of established plants or the germination and growth of seeds and seedlings. Weed growth can also inhibit the growth of later-successional species in ecological succession.

Introduced species have been observed to undergo rapid evolutionary change to adapt to their new environments, with changes in plant height, size, leaf shape, dispersal ability, reproductive output, vegetative reproduction ability, level of dependence on the mycorrhizal network, and level of phenotype plasticity appearing on timescales of decades to centuries. Invasive species can be more adaptable in their new environments than in their native environments, occupying broader ranges in areas where they are invasive than in areas where they are native. Hybridization between similar species can produce novel invasive plants that are better adapted to their surroundings. Polyploidy is also observed to be strongly selected for among some invasive populations, such as Solidago canadensis in China. Many weed species are now found almost worldwide, with novel adaptations that suit regional populations to their environments.

== Negative impacts ==
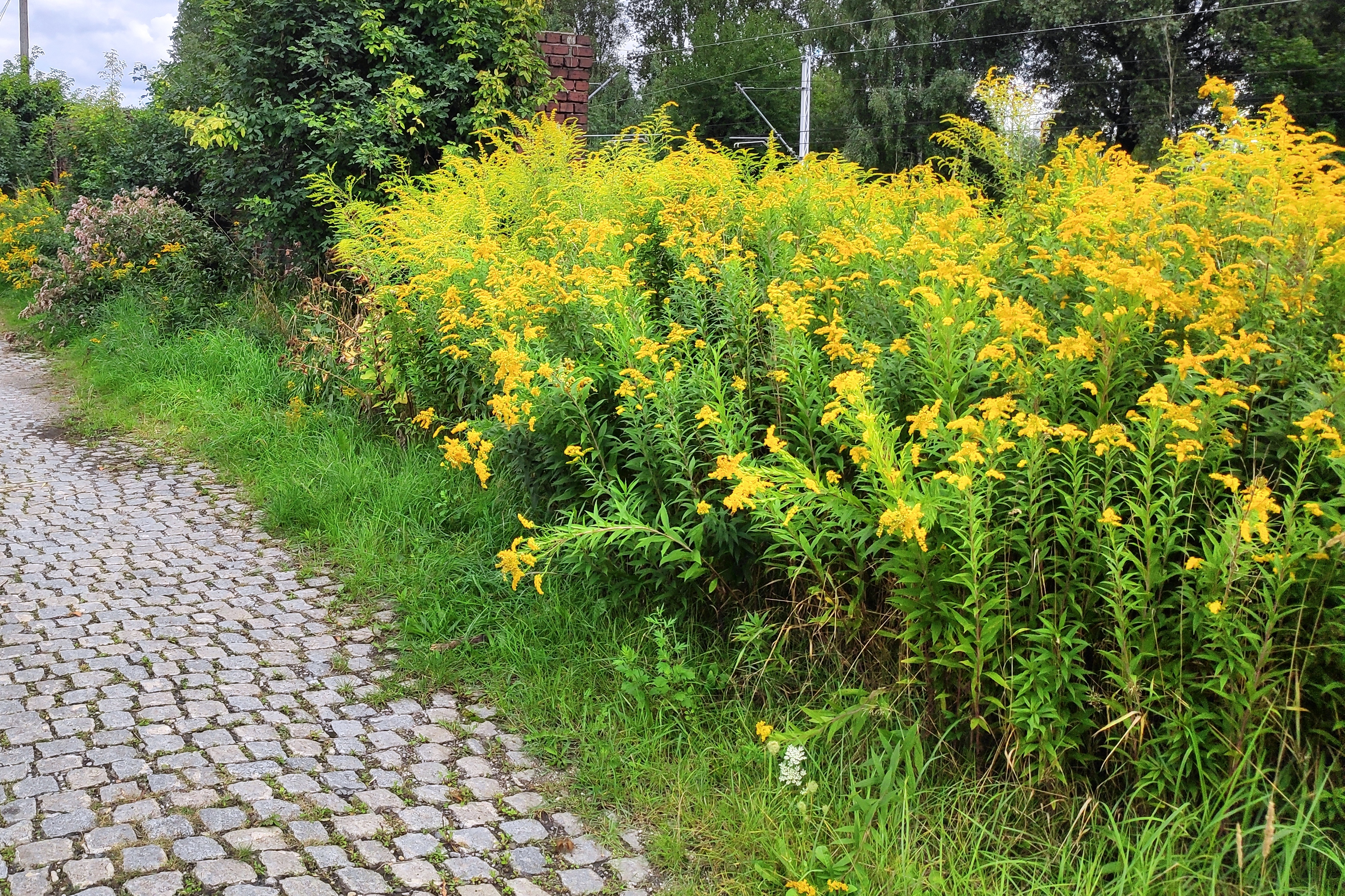
Invasive Canada Goldenrod as a roadside weed in Poland

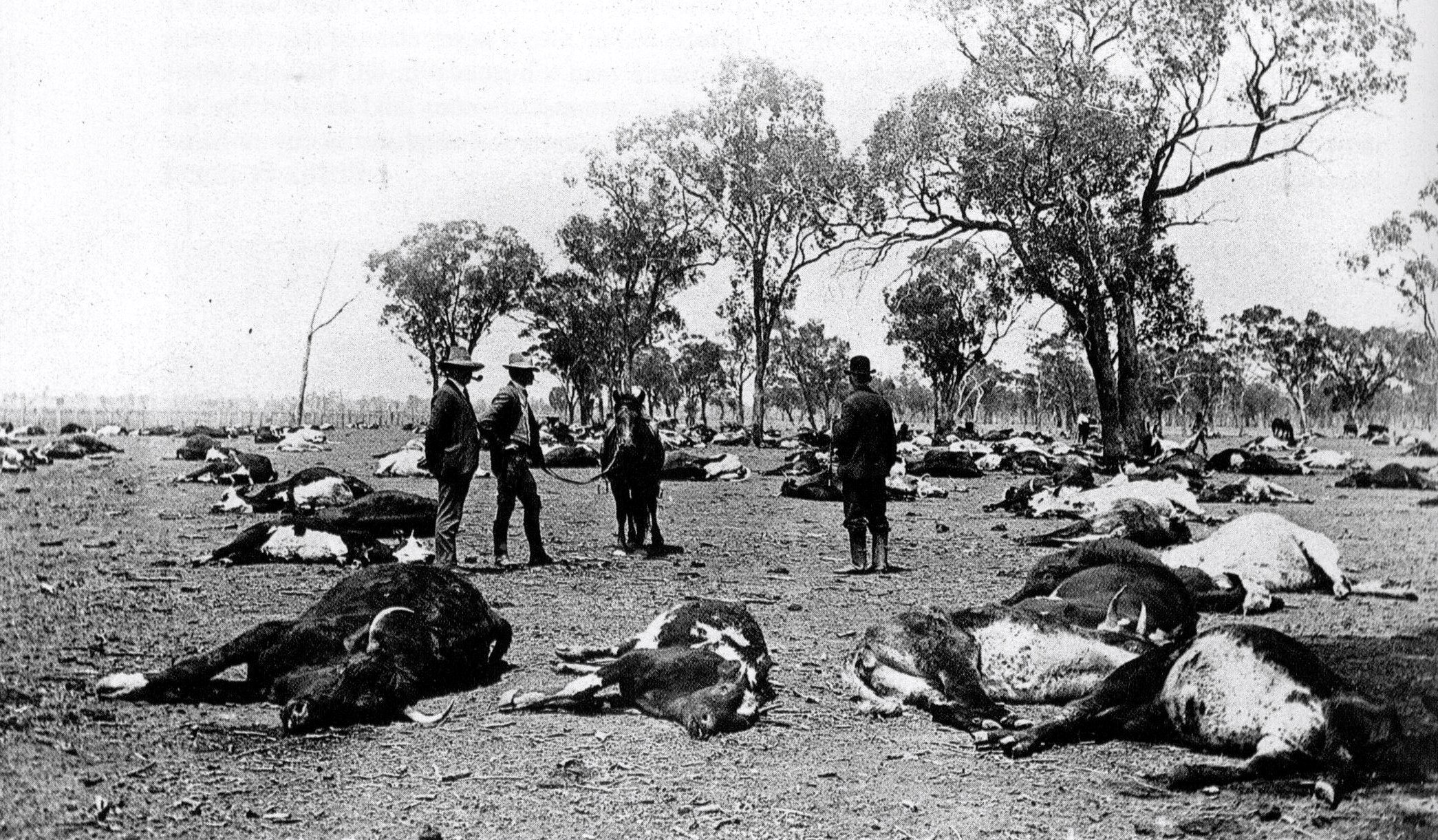
Australia, 1907: Cattlemen survey 700 carcasses of cattle that were killed overnight by a poisonous plant.

Some negative impacts of weeds are functional: they interfere with food and fiber production in agriculture, wherein they must be controlled to prevent lost or diminished crop yields. In other settings, they interfere with other cosmetic, decorative, or recreational goals, such as in lawns, landscape architecture, playing fields, and golf courses. In the case of invasive species, they can be of concern for environmental reasons, when introduced species outcompete native plants and cause broader damage to ecosystem health and functioning. Some weed species have been classified as noxious weeds by government authorities because, if left unchecked, they often compete with native or crop plants or cause harm to livestock. They are often foreign species accidentally or imprudently imported into a region where there are few natural controls to limit their population and spread.

In a range of contexts, weeds can have negative impacts by:

- competing with the desired plants for the resources that a plant typically needs, namely, direct sunlight, soil nutrients, water, and (to a lesser extent) space for growth,
- providing hosts and vectors for plant pathogens, giving them greater opportunity to infect and degrade the quality of the desired plants;
- providing food or shelter for animal pests such as seed-eating birds and Tephritid fruit flies that otherwise could hardly survive seasonal shortages;
- offering irritation to the skin or digestive tracts of people or animals, either physical irritation via thorns, prickles, or burs, or chemical irritation via natural poisons or irritants in the weed (for example, the poisons found in Nerium species);
- causing root damage to engineering works such as drains, road surfaces, and foundations,
- in the case of aquatic plants, obstructing or clogging streams and waterways, which interferes with boating, irrigation systems, fishing, and hydroelectric power.

== Positive impacts ==
"What would the world be, once bereft,
of wet and wildness? Let them be left.
O let them be left; wildness and wet;
Long live the weeds and the wilderness yet.

— Gerard Manley Hopkins' poem Inversnaid

While the term "weed" generally has a negative connotation, many plants known as weeds can have beneficial properties. A number of weeds, such as the dandelion (Taraxacum) and lamb's quarter, are edible, and their leaves or roots may be used for food or herbal medicine. Burdock is common over much of the world, and is sometimes used to make soup and medicine in East Asia. Some weeds attract beneficial insects, which in turn can protect crops from harmful pests. Weeds can also prevent pest insects from finding a crop, because their presence disrupts the incidence of positive cues which pests use to locate their food. Weeds may also act as a "living mulch", providing ground cover that reduces moisture loss and prevents erosion. Weeds may also improve soil fertility; dandelions, for example, bring up nutrients like calcium and nitrogen from deep in the soil with their taproot, and clover hosts nitrogen-fixing bacteria in its roots, fertilizing the soil directly. The dandelion is also one of several species which break up hardpan in overly cultivated fields, helping crops grow deeper root systems. Some garden flowers originated as weeds in cultivated fields and have been selectively bred for their garden-worthy flowers or foliage. An example of a crop weed that is grown in gardens is the corncockle (Agrostemma githago), which was a common weed in European wheat fields, but is now sometimes grown as a garden plant.

=== Ecological role ===
As pioneer species, weeds begin the process of ecological succession after a disturbance event. The rapid, aggressive growth of weeds rapidly prevents erosion in newly exposed bare soil, and has substantially slowed topsoil loss due to anthropogenic disturbances.

=== In climate change adaptation ===
It has been suggested that weeds, with their aggressive ability to adapt, could provide humans with vital tools and knowledge for climate change adaptation. Some researchers argue that researching weed species could offer valuable insights for crop breeding, or that weeds themselves hold potential as hardy, climate-change-resistant crops. Adaptable weeds could also be a source of transgenic genes which could confer useful traits upon crops.

Weed species have been used in the restoration of land in Australia using a method called natural sequence farming. This method allows non-native weeds to stabilize and restore degraded areas where native species are not yet capable of regenerating themselves.

== Weeds as adaptable species ==
"We've got to be one of the most bomb-proof species on the planet."

— Paleontologist David Jablonsky

An alternate definition often used by biologists is any species, not just plants, that can quickly adapt to any environment. Some traits of weedy species are the ability to reproduce quickly, disperse widely, live in a variety of habitats, establish a population in strange places, succeed in disturbed ecosystems and resist eradication once established. Such species often do well in human-dominated environments as other species are not able to adapt. Common examples include the common pigeon, brown rat and the raccoon. Other weedy species have been able to expand their range without actually living in human environments, as human activity has damaged the ecosystems of other species. These include the coyote, the white-tailed deer and the brown headed cowbird.

In response to the idea that humans may face extinction due to environmental degradation, paleontologist David Jablonsky counters by arguing that humans are a weed species. Like other weedy species, humans are widely dispersed in a wide variety of environments, and are highly unlikely to go extinct no matter how much damage the environment faces.

== Plants often considered to be weeds ==
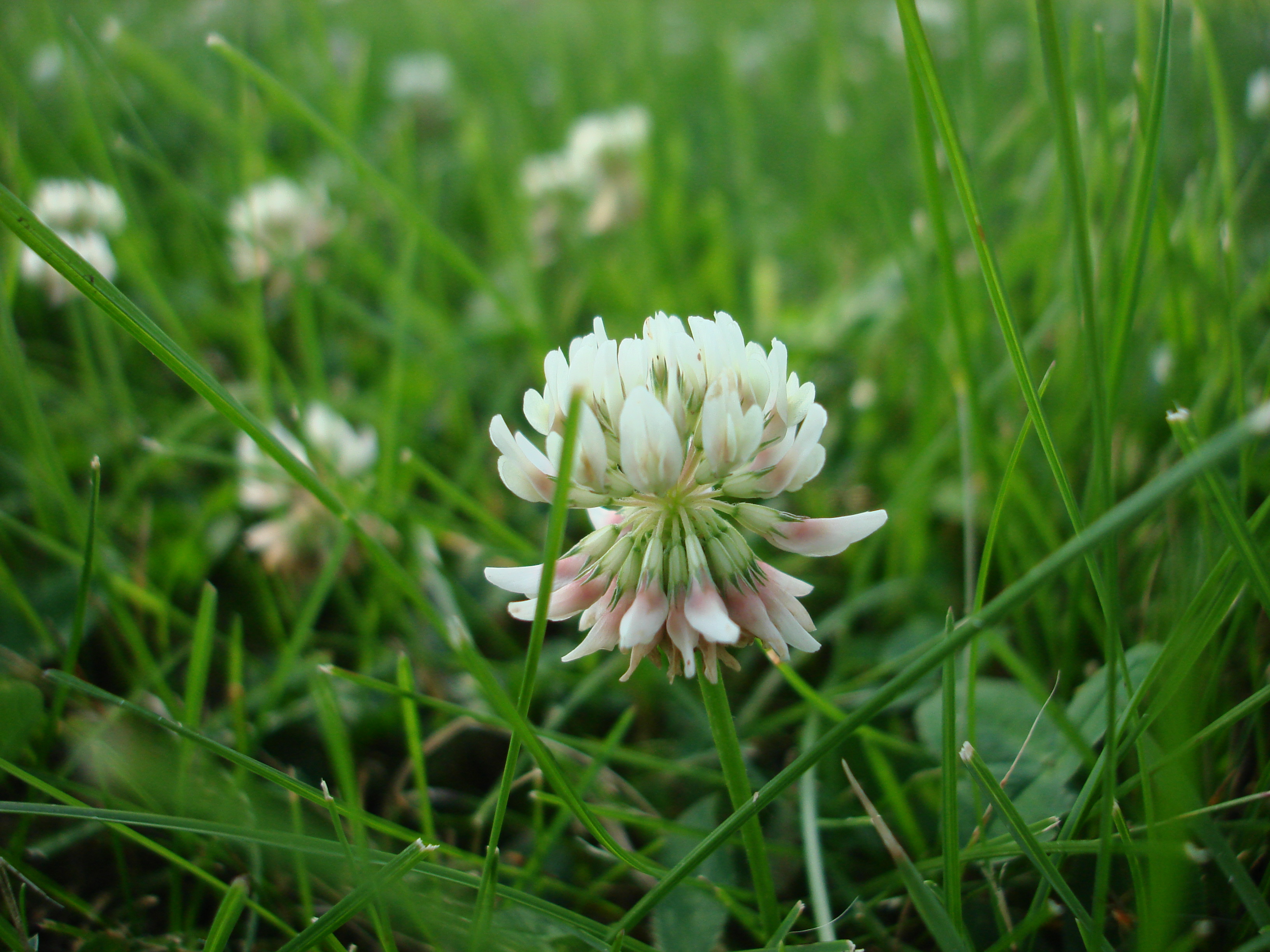
White clover

White clover is considered by some to be a weed in lawns, but in many other situations is a desirable source of fodder, honey and soil nitrogen.

A short list of some plants that often are considered to be weeds follows:

- Amaranth – ("pigweed") annual with copious long-lasting seeds, also a highly edible and resilient food source
- Bermuda grass – perennial, spreading by runners, rhizomes and seeds.
- Bindweed
- Broadleaf plantain – perennial, spreads by seeds that persist in the soil for many years
- Burdock – biennial
- Common lambsquarters – annual
- Cogongrass - Imperata cylindrica - One of the most damaging pest weeds in the world, infesting vast areas in the tropics.
- Creeping charlie – perennial, fast-spreading plants with long creeping stems
- Dandelion – perennial, wind-spread, fast-growing, and drought-tolerant
- Goldenrod – perennial
- Japanese knotweed
- Kudzu – perennial
- Leafy spurge – perennial, with underground stems
- Milk thistle – annual or biennial
- Poison ivy – perennial
- Ragweed – annual
- Sorrel – annual or perennial
- Striga
- St. John's wort – perennial
- Sumac – woody perennial
- Tree of heaven – woody perennial
- Wild carrot – biennial
- Wood sorrel – perennial
- Yellow nutsedge – perennial

Many invasive weeds were introduced deliberately in the first place, and may have not been considered nuisances at the time, but rather beneficial.

== Weed control ==
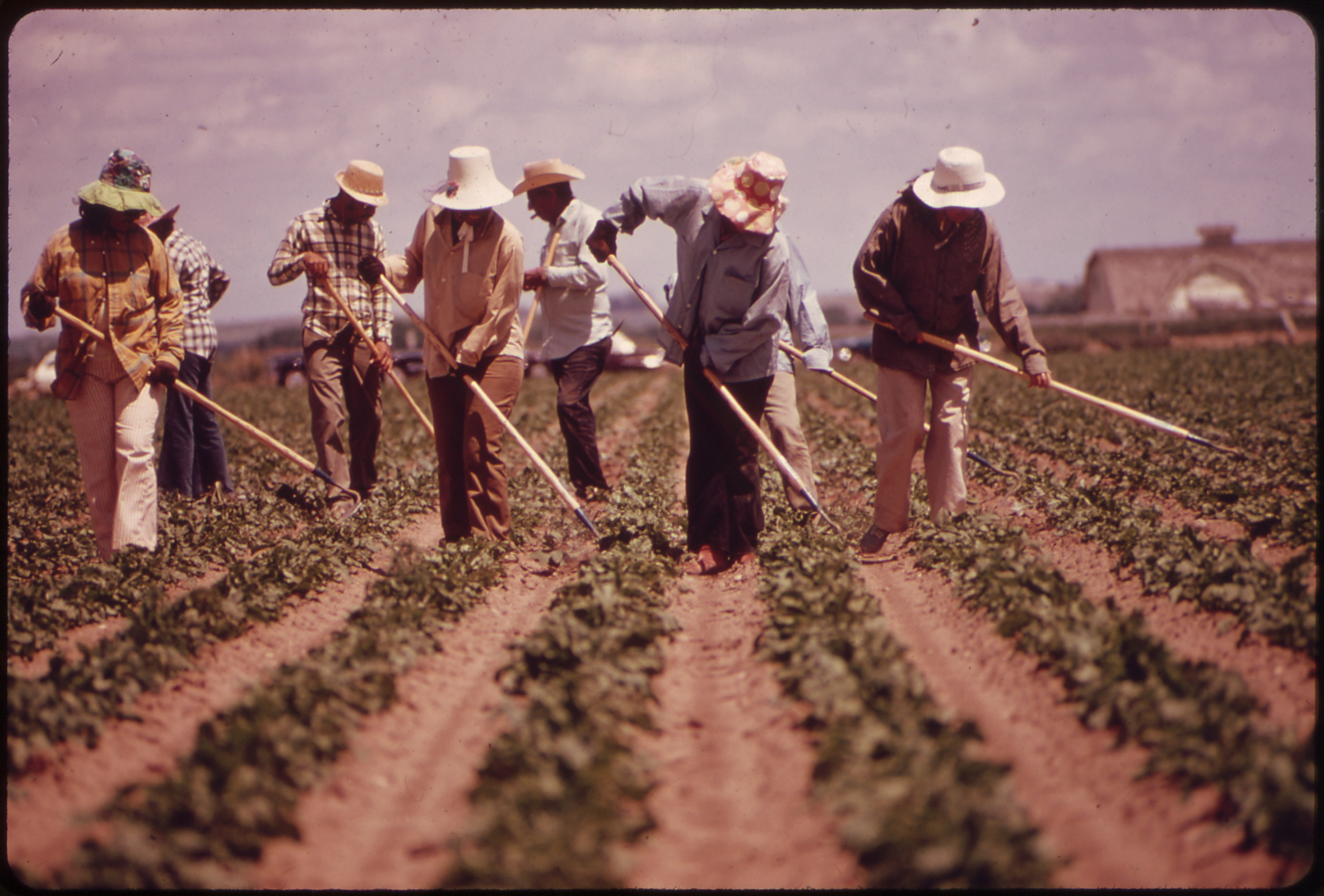
A field of beets being weeded in Colorado, United States, in 1972

Weed control encompasses a range of methods used by humans to stop, reduce or prevent the growth and reproduction of weeds within agricultural or other managed environments. Some weed control is preventative, implementing protocols to stop weeds from invading new areas. Cultural weed control involves shaping the managed environment to make it less favorable for weeds. Once weeds are present in an area, a wide variety of means to destroy the weeds and their seeds can be employed. Since weeds are highly adaptable, relying on a single method to control weeds soon results in the invasion or adaptation of weeds that are not susceptible. Integrated pest management as it applies to weeds refers to a plan of controlling weeds that integrates multiple methods of weed control and prevention.

Methods of preventative weed control include cleaning equipment, stopping existing weeds in nearby areas from producing seed, and avoiding seed or manure that could be contaminated with weeds. A wide variety of cultural weed control methods are used, including cover cropping, crop rotation, selecting the most competitive cultivars of crops, mulching, planting with optimal density, and intercropping.

Mechanical methods of weed control involve physically cutting, uprooting, or otherwise destroying weeds. On small farms, hand weeding is the dominant means of weed control, but as larger farms dominate agriculture, this method becomes less feasible. On many operations, however, some hand-weeding may be an unavoidable component of weed control. Tillage, mowing, and burning are common examples of mechanical weed control on larger scales. New technology increases the range of mechanical weed control options. One newly emerging form of mechanical weed control uses electricity to kill weeds.

Mechanical weed control has been increasingly replaced by the use of herbicides. The reliance on herbicides has resulted in the rapid evolution of herbicide resistance in weeds, making previously effective herbicide treatments useless for the control of weeds. In particular, glyphosate, which was once considered a revolutionary breakthrough in weed control, was relied upon heavily when it was first introduced to agriculture, resulting in rapid emergence of resistance. As of 2023, 58 weed species have developed resistance to glyphosate.

Herbicide resistance in weeds has rapidly developed into new, increasingly challenging forms as the plants continually evolve. Non-target site resistance, or NTSR, is particularly difficult to counteract, since it may confer resistance to multiple herbicides at once, including herbicides the plants' ancestors were never exposed to. Various methods of adjusting herbicide application to avoid resistance, such as rotating herbicides used and tank mixing herbicides, have all been questioned in terms of their efficacy for preventing resistance from arising.

Understanding the habit of weeds is important for non-chemical methods of weed control, such as plowing, surface scuffling, promotion of more beneficial cover crops, and prevention of seed accumulation in fields. For example, amaranth is an edible plant that is considered a weed by mainstream modern agriculture. It produces copious seeds (up to 1 million per plant) that last many years, and is an early-emergent fast grower. Those seeking to control amaranth quote the mantra "This year's seeds become next year's weeds!". However, another view of amaranth values the plant as a resilient food source.

Some people have appreciated weeds for their tenacity, their wildness and even the work and connection to nature they provide. As Christopher Lloyd wrote in The Well-Tempered Garden:

Many gardeners will agree that hand-weeding is not the terrible drudgery that it is often made out to be. Some people find in it a kind of soothing monotony. It leaves their minds free to develop the plot for their next novel or to perfect the brilliant repartee with which they should have encountered a relative's latest example of unreasonableness.

In the United Kingdom it is illegal under the Wildlife and Countryside Act 1981 to plant or allow to grow certain plants in the wild.

=== Under climate change ===
As anthropogenic climate change increases temperatures and atmospheric carbon dioxide, many weeds are expected to become harder to control and to expand their ranges, at the expense of less "weedy" species. For example, kudzu, the infamous invasive vine found throughout the Southeastern United States, is expected to spread northward due to climate change. Increased competitive strength of agricultural weeds in future climate conditions threaten future ability to grow crops. Existing weed management practices will likely fail under future changes in climate conditions, meaning new agricultural techniques will be needed for global food security. Suggested techniques are holistic, transitioning away from reliance on herbicide, and include aggressive adaptation of agroforestry and use of allelopathic crop residues to suppress weeds.

== See also ==
- Crop weeds
- Introduced species
- Invasive species
- List of beneficial weeds
- Pest (organism)
- Superweeds
- Vavilovian mimicry
- Vermin
- Volunteer (botany)
- Weed of cultivation
- Wildflower
- Wildlife and Countryside Act 1981
