= Sonnet 63 =

« » Sonnet 63
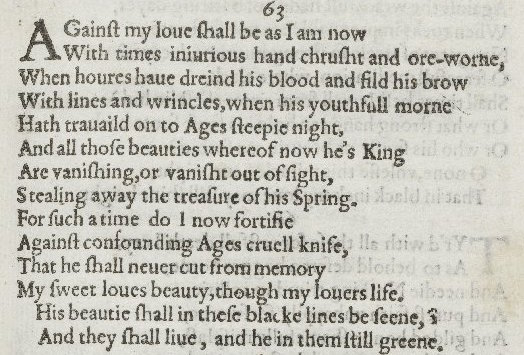
- Sonnet 63 in the 1609 Quarto
Q1
Q2
Q3
C
Against my love shall be, as I am now,
With time’s injurious hand crushed and o’erworn;
When hours have drained his blood, and filled his brow
With lines and wrinkles; when his youthful morn
Hath travailed on to age’s steepy night,
And all those beauties whereof now he’s king
Are vanishing, or vanished out of sight,
Stealing away the treasure of his spring;
For such a time do I now fortify
Against confounding age’s cruel knife,
That he shall never cut from memory
My sweet love’s beauty, though my lover’s life.
His beauty shall in these black lines be seen,
And they shall live, and he in them still green.
—William Shakespeare
4
8
12
14

Sonnet 63 is one of 154 sonnets published in 1609 by the English playwright and poet William Shakespeare. It is one of the Fair Youth sequence. Contrary to most of the other poems in the Fair Youth sequence, in Sonnets 63 to 68 there is no explicit addressee, and the second person pronoun (you or thou) is not used anywhere in sonnets 63 to 68.

== Synopsis ==
In Sonnet 63, the poet expresses his concern that the memory of his love's beauty be preserved and protected. The poet imagines a time when the young man will be old and worn, as he, the poet, is now. The passing of time will drain the young man's blood, carve wrinkles in his face, erode and wear away all of his beauty. Time will eventually take away the young man. To prevent the young man's beauty being cut from memory, this sonnet will be read and will preserve the memory of the young man's beauty. Unlike Sonnet 2, in which immortality is gained through procreation, here it is gained in the reading of this poem ("these black lines").

== Structure ==
Sonnet 63 is an English or Shakespearean sonnet. The English sonnet has three quatrains, followed by a final rhyming couplet. It follows the typical rhyme scheme of the form, ABAB CDCD EFEF GG, and is composed in iambic pentameter, a type of poetic metre based on five pairs of metrically weak/strong syllabic positions. The third line exemplifies a regular iambic pentameter:

  ×   /     ×     /      ×    /    ×    /      ×    / 
When hours have drained his blood, and filled his brow (63.3)

/ = ictus, a metrically strong syllabic position. × = nonictus.

The sonnet is quite metrically regular, but two variations stand out:

 ×    /     ×  /  ×    /     /      ×   ×     / 
With time's injurious hand crushed and o'er-worn; (63.2)

  /  ×   × /    ×   /  ×    /  ×     / 
Stealing away the treasure of his spring; (63.8)

Reversals — such as the mid-line reversal "crush'd and", and the initial reversal "stealing" — can be used to bring special emphasis to words, especially verbs of action or motion, a practice Marina Tarlinskaja calls rhythmical italics. Here, both instances highlight Time's cruel effects upon beauty.

== Analysis ==
Like Sonnet 2, this poem makes use of cutting and crushing imagery to depict the effects of time in creating wrinkles on the face. The prevailing metaphors in this sonnet compare youthful beauty to riches, similar to Sonnet 4, and old age and death to night, similar to Sonnet 12.

The attention to the subject's mortality, returned to in this sonnet, remains the focus for the next two sonnets, and Sonnet 65 contains much the same resolution as this one does.
