= Explicator =

Explicator may refer to:

- something or someone that explicates
- Explicator verb
- The Explicator, a journal of literary criticism
