= Crop weed =

Unwanted plants growing amongst crops

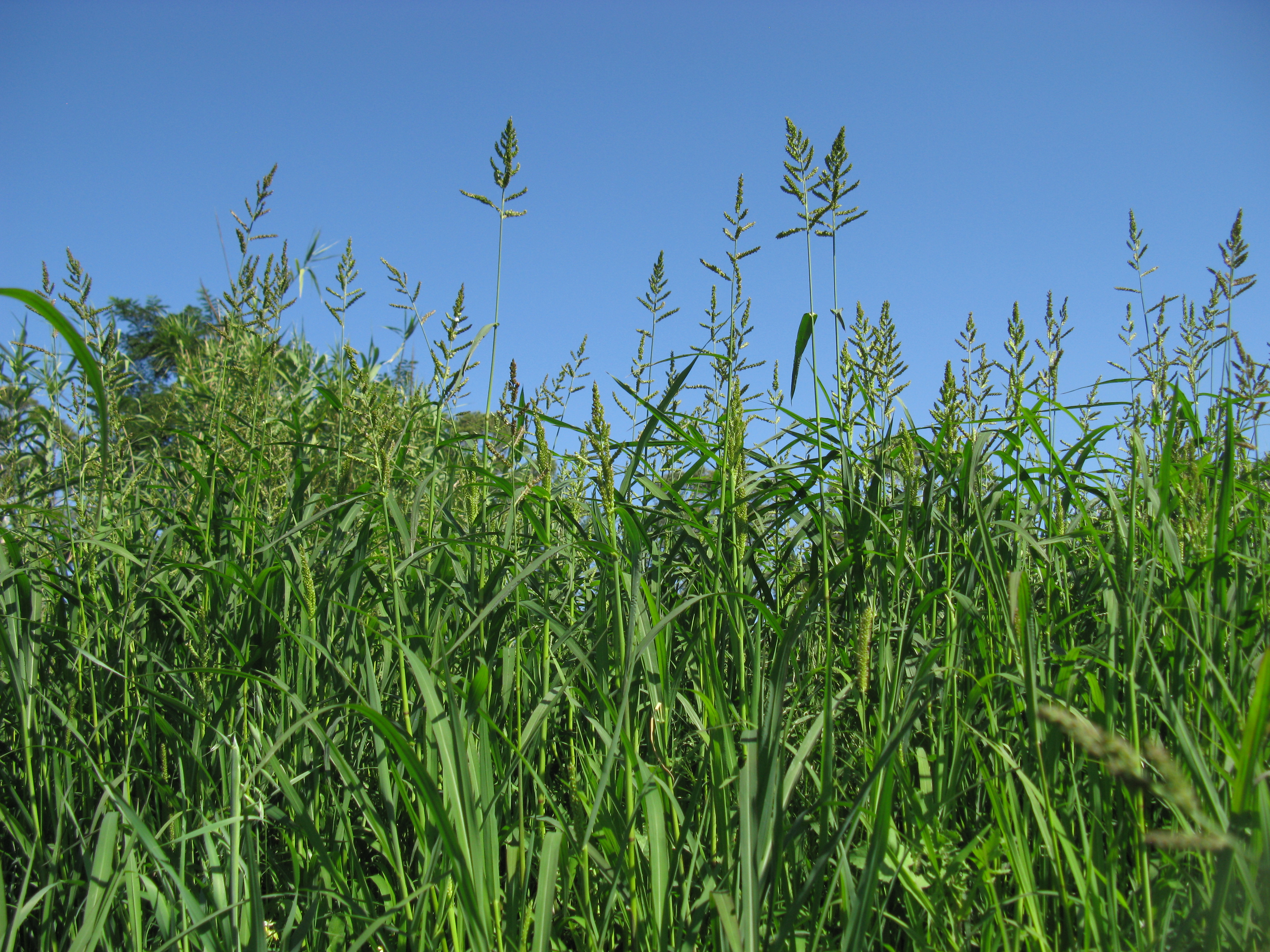
Barnyard grass, a crop weed

Crop weeds are weeds that grow amongst crops.

Despite the potential for some crop weeds to be used as a food source, many can also prove harmful to crops, both directly and indirectly. Crop weeds can inhibit the growth of crops, contaminate harvested crops and often spread rapidly. They can also host crop pests such as aphids, fungal rots and viruses. Cost increases and yield losses occur as a result. Striga, one of the main cereal crop weeds in Sub-Saharan Africa, commonly causes yield losses of 40–100% and accounts for around $7 billion in losses annually. Around 100 million hectares of land in Sub-Saharan Africa are affected by striga. Barnyard grass has been identified as a culprit in global rice yield losses and certain species have been known to mimic rice.

Examples of crop weeds include chickweed, barnyard grass, dandelion, striga and Japanese knotweed. A less commonly known crop weed is Abelmoschus ficulneus.

== See also ==
- Weed of cultivation
