= Sonnet 70 =

« » Sonnet 70
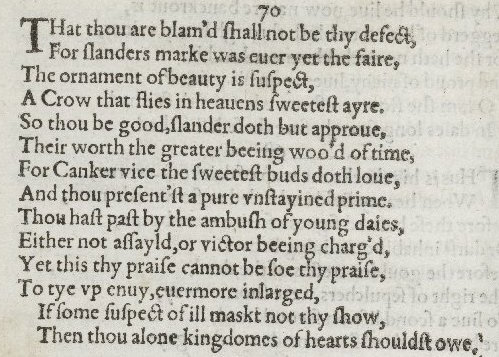
- Sonnet 70 in the 1609 Quarto
Q1
Q2
Q3
C
That thou art blam’d shall not be thy defect,
For slander’s mark was ever yet the fair;
The ornament of beauty is suspect,
A crow that flies in heaven’s sweetest air.
So thou be good, slander doth but approve
Thy worth the greater, being woo’d of time;
For canker vice the sweetest buds doth love,
And thou present’st a pure unstained prime.
Thou hast pass’d by the ambush of young days,
Either not assail’d, or victor being charg’d;
Yet this thy praise cannot be so thy praise,
To tie up envy evermore enlarg’d:
If some suspect of ill mask’d not thy show,
Then thou alone kingdoms of hearts shouldst owe.
—William Shakespeare
4
8
12
14

Sonnet 70 is one of 154 sonnets written by the English playwright and poet William Shakespeare. It is a member of the Fair Youth sequence, in which the poet expresses his love towards a young man.

== Synopsis ==
Q1 The Speaker assures a young man that accusations against him do not actually harm him, because beauty is always a target ("mark") for slander. Q2 In fact, slander only verifies the worth of the good, as it seeks to be attached to the very best, as (the Speaker claims) the young man is. Q3 The young man has made it this far, either avoiding or triumphing over vice, yet this praise is insufficient to "tie up envy", which always increases. C "[I]f a hint or suspicion of badness did not disguise your true appearance, entire nations would be in thrall to you."

== Structure ==
Sonnet 70 is an English or Shakespearean sonnet. The English sonnet has three quatrains, followed by a final rhyming couplet. It follows the typical rhyme scheme of the form, ABAB CDCD EFEF GG, and is composed in iambic pentameter, a type of poetic metre based on five pairs of metrically weak/strong syllabic positions. The fourth line exemplifies a regular iambic pentameter:

×   /    ×    /   ×   /  ×      /  ×   / 
A crow that flies in heaven's sweetest air. (70.4)

/ = ictus, a metrically strong syllabic position. × = nonictus.

The meter demands a few variant pronunciations: The first and third lines' rhyming words, "defect" and "suspect" are both stressed on the second syllable. Though it is uncertain how contracted words like this might have been in Elizabethan pronunciation, line ten's "either" functions as one syllable, and might have been pronounced as one.
