= Sonnet 72 =

« » Sonnet 72
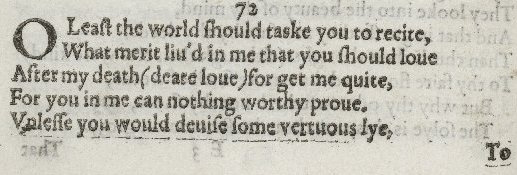
- The first five lines of Sonnet 72 in the 1609 Quarto
Q1
Q2
Q3
C
O, lest the world should task you to recite
What merit liv’d in me, that you should love
After my death (dear love) forget me quite,
For you in me can nothing worthy prove;
Unless you would devise some virtuous lie,
To do more for me than mine own desert,
And hang more praise upon deceased I
Than niggard truth would willingly impart;
O, lest your true love may seem false in this,
That you for love speak well of me untrue,
My name be buried where my body is,
And live no more to shame nor me nor you:
For I am shamed by that which I bring forth,
And so should you, to love things nothing worth.
—William Shakespeare
4
8
12
14

Sonnet 72 is one of 154 sonnets published by the English playwright and poet William Shakespeare in 1609. It is one of the Fair Youth Sequence, which includes Sonnet 1 through Sonnet 126.

== Synopsis ==
Sonnet 72 continues after Sonnet 71, with a plea by the poet to be forgotten. The poem avoids drowning in self-pity and exaggerated modesty by mixing in touches of irony. The first quatrain presents an image of the poet as dead and not worth remembering, and suggests an ironic reversal of roles with the idea of the young man reciting words to express his love for the poet. Line five imagines that the young man, in this role, would have to lie. And line seven suggests that the young man as poet would have to “hang more praise” on the poet than the truth would allow. The couplet ends with shame and worthlessness, and the ironic suggestion of contempt for the process of writing fawning poetry to an unworthy subject.

== Structure ==
Sonnet 72 is an English or Shakespearean sonnet. The English sonnet has three quatrains, followed by a final rhyming couplet. It follows the typical rhyme scheme of the form, ABAB CDCD EFEF GG, and is composed in iambic pentameter, a type of poetic metre based on five pairs of metrically weak/strong syllabic positions. The fifth line (accepting a 2-syllable pronunciation of "virtuous") exemplifies a regular iambic pentameter:

×  /    ×   /     × /    ×    /   ×    / 
Unless you would devise some virtuous lie, (72.5)

/ = ictus, a metrically strong syllabic position. × = nonictus.

In line nine, the lexical stress of "true" would normally be subordinated to that of "love", fitting most naturally into × / which would create a variation in the meter of the line. Placing contrastive accent upon "true" preserves the regular iambic meter...

×   /    ×     /   ×    /   ×    /    ×    / 
O! lest your true love may seem false in this (72.9)

... which, as it is revealed later in the line, is appropriate to the sense, as "true love" is contrasted with seeming "false" — an example of Shakespeare using metrical expectations to highlight shades of meaning.

== Context ==
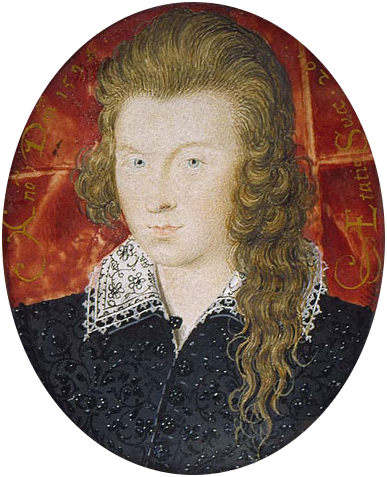
Henry Wriothesley, 3rd Earl of Southampton at 21. Shakespeare's patron, and one candidate for the Fair Youth of the sonnets.

Sonnet 71 through Sonnet 74 group together as a sequence due to their dark, brooding tone, and the poet's obsession with his own mortality and legacy. The sequence begins in Sonnet 71 with "No longer mourn for me when I am dead" and ends with "And that is this, and this with thee remains" in Sonnet 74. Sonnet 72 is one of 126 Sonnets coined "The Fair Youth Sequence". The identity of said "Fair Youth" remains a mystery. Several scholars point, in particular to Henry Wriothesley, 3rd Earl of Southampton and William Herbert, 3rd Earl of Pembroke.

== Analysis ==
Sonnet 72 is a continuation from Sonnet 71. Both sonnets are an anticipatory plea regarding death and the afterlife from the writer to the reader. The overarching subject of Sonnet 72 is The Poet's fixation with how he will be remembered after death. Subsequently the tone remains bleak and self-deprecating.

John Cumming Walters states: "In the sonnets we may read the poet's intents, hopes, and fears regarding his fate, and we learn of his all consuming desire for immortality...Bodily death he does not fear: oblivion he dreads."

In Line 2, "What merit lived in me that you should love", the poet considers his own mortality and worth. Line 7, "And hang more praise upon deceased I", derives from the practice of hanging epitaphs and trophies on the gravestone or marker of the deceased.

Line 13 of the couplet,"For I am shamed by that which I bring forth," may refer to, or resonate with the Biblical verses in Mark: 7.20-23:

"That which cometh out of the man, that defileth the man. For from within, out of the heart of men, proceed evil thoughts, adulteries, fornications, murders, thefts, covetousness, wickedness, deceit, lasciviousness, an evil eye, blasphemy, foolishness: all these evil things come from within and defile the man."
