= Sonnet 68 =

« » Sonnet 68
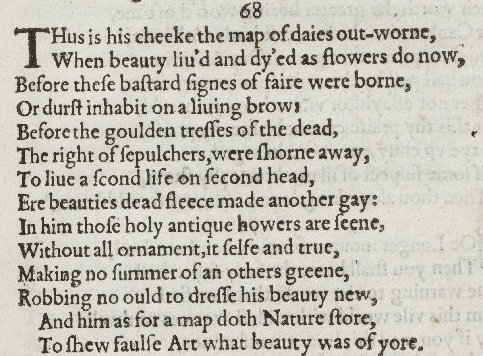
- Sonnet 68 in the 1609 Quarto
Q1
Q2
Q3
C
Thus is his cheek the map of days outworn,
When beauty liv’d and died as flowers do now,
Before these bastard signs of fair were born,
Or durst inhabit on a living brow;
Before the golden tresses of the dead,
The right of sepulchres, were shorn away,
To live a second life on second head;
Ere beauty’s dead fleece made another gay:
In him those holy antique hours are seen,
Without all ornament itself and true,
Making no summer of another’s green,
Robbing no old to dress his beauty new;
And him as for a map doth Nature store,
To show false Art what beauty was of yore.
—William Shakespeare
4
8
12
14

Sonnet 68 is one of 154 sonnets written by the English playwright and poet William Shakespeare. It is a member of the Fair Youth sequence, in which the poet expresses his love towards a young man.

== Structure ==
Sonnet 68 is an English or Shakespearean sonnet. The English sonnet has three quatrains, followed by a final rhyming couplet. It follows the typical rhyme scheme of the form, abab cdcd efef gg and is composed in iambic pentameter, a type of poetic metre based on five pairs of metrically weak/strong syllabic positions. The second line exemplifies a regular iambic pentameter:

  ×   /   ×  /    ×    /   ×    /      ×  / 
When beauty lived and died as flowers do now, (68.2)

/ = ictus, a metrically strong syllabic position. × = nonictus.

The scansion of the eighth line is ambivalent. Normally the words "dead fleece" would have the stress of "dead" subordinated to that of "fleece", allowing them comfortably to fill × / positions, not / ×. However, if accent is placed on "dead", a regular scansion emerges:

×    /   ×    /     ×     /   × /  ×   / 
Ere beauty's dead fleece made another gay: (68.8)

Alternatively, "fleece" can maintain the greater stress, suggesting this scansion:

×    /   ×    /     /     ×   × /  ×   / 
Ere beauty's dead fleece made another gay: (68.8)

A reversal of the third ictus (as shown above) is normally preceded by at least a slight intonational break, which "dead fleece" does not allow. Peter Groves calls this a "harsh mapping", and recommends that in performance "the best thing to do is to prolong the subordinated S-syllable [here, "dead"] ... the effect of this is to throw a degree of emphasis on it".
