= Sonnet 66 =

« » Sonnet 66
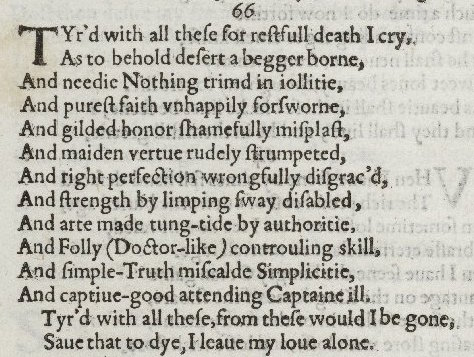
- Sonnet 66 in the 1609 Quarto
Q1
Q2
Q3
C
Tir’d with all these, for restful death I cry,
As, to behold desert a beggar born,
And needy nothing trimm’d in jollity,
And purest faith unhappily forsworn,
And gilded honour shamefully misplac’d,
And maiden virtue rudely strumpeted,
And right perfection wrongfully disgrac’d,
And strength by limping sway disabled,
And art made tongue-tied by authority,
And folly, doctor-like, controlling skill,
And simple truth miscall’d simplicity,
And captive good attending captain ill:
Tired with all these, from these would I be gone,
Save that, to die, I leave my love alone.
—William Shakespeare
4
8
12
14

Sonnet 66 is one of 154 sonnets written by the English playwright and poet William Shakespeare. It's a member of the Fair Youth sequence, in which the poet expresses his love towards a young man.

== Synopsis ==
Sonnet 66 is a world-weary, desperate list of grievances of the state of the poet's society. The speaker criticizes three things: general unfairness of life, societal immorality, and oppressive government. Lines 2 and 3 illustrate the economic unfairness caused by one's station or nobility:

As, to behold desert a beggar born,
And needy nothing trimm'd in jollity, (66.2-3)

Lines 4-7 portray disgraced trust and loyalty, unfairly given authority, as by an unworthy king "gilded honour shamefully misplaced", and female innocence corrupted "Maiden virtue rudely strumpeted". Lines 8, 10, and 12, as in lines 2 and 3, characterize reversals of what one deserves, and what one actually receives in life.

As opposed to most of his sonnets, which have a "turn" in mood or thought at line 9, (the beginning of the third quatrain (See: Sonnets 29, 18) the mood of Sonnet 66 does not change until the last line, when the speaker declares that the only thing keeping him alive is his lover. This stresses the fact that his lover is helping him merely survive, whereas sonnets 29 and 30 are much more positive and have 6 lines in which they affirm that the lover is the fulfillment of the poet's life.

== Structure ==
Sonnet 66 is an English or Shakespearean sonnet. The English sonnet has three quatrains, followed by a final rhyming couplet. It follows the typical rhyme scheme of the form, ABAB CDCD EFEF GG, and is composed in iambic pentameter, a type of poetic metre based on five pairs of metrically weak/strong syllabic positions. The tenth line exemplifies a regular iambic pentameter:

×    /  ×  /  ×   /    ×   /  ×     / 
And folly doctor-like controlling skill, (66.10)

/ = ictus, a metrically strong syllabic position. × = nonictus.

This line and its rhyme-mate, line 12, happen to have a fully stressed syllable for each ictus; all the other regular lines have one unstressed syllable taking the ictus (for example the final syllables of line four's "unhappily" and line eight's four-syllable "disabled"). These highly-patterned lines are bookended by four lines — two at the beginning and two at the end — with an initial reversal, as in line one:

 /     ×   ×     /     ×   /   ×   /    ×   / 
Tired with all these, for restful death I cry, (66.1)

== Interpretations and adaptations ==
Dmitri Shostakovich set Boris Pasternak's Russian translation of this sonnet to music as part of his 1942 song cycle Six Romances on Verses by English Poets (Op. 62). Because Pasternak's translation is also in iambic pentameter, the piece can be, and sometimes is, performed with Shakespeare's original words instead (for example, by Gerald Finley on his 2014 album of Shostakovich songs for Ondine). The critic Ian MacDonald suggested that Shostakovich may have used this sonnet, with its reference to "art made tongue-tied by authority," as an oblique commentary on his own oppression by the Soviet state; however, the scholar Elizabeth Wilson pointed out that Pasternak's translation "somewhat watered down" the original's meaning, with his version of that line translating as "And remember that thoughts will close up the mouth."

Sonnet 66 has historically been much more popular in Europe than in the English-speaking world, particularly in German and Czech translation.

Alan Bates performed this sonnet for the 2002 compilation album, When Love Speaks (EMI Classics).
