= Weed of cultivation =

Weed adapted to cultivated land

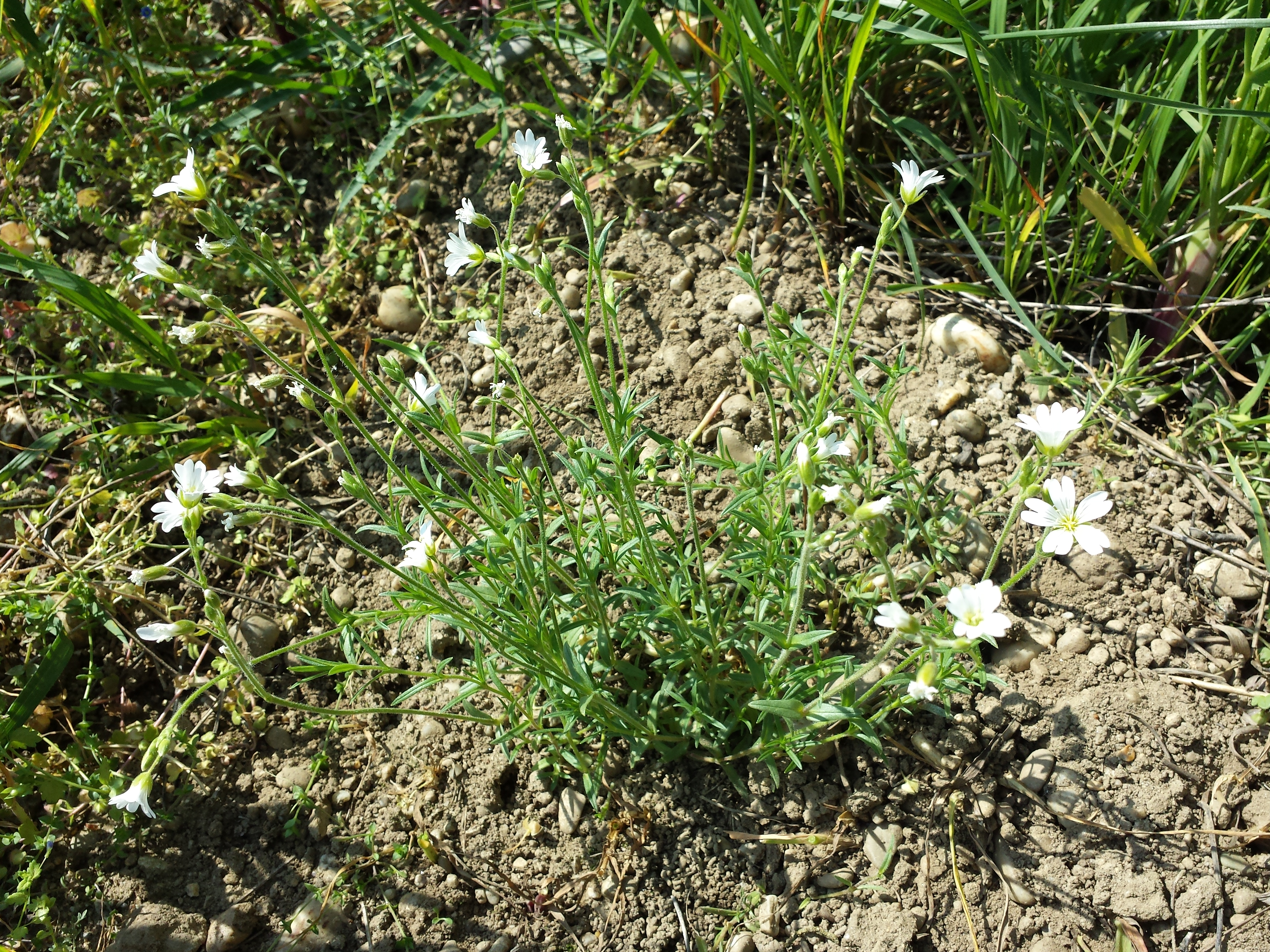
Field chickweed growing on cultivated land

A weed of cultivation is any plant that is well-adapted to environments in which land is cultivated for growing some other plant.

Many such weeds are quite specialised and can only thrive and reproduce where the ground has been broken by plough or spade. They are invariably annual and reproduction is by seed alone, which can in many species lie dormant for years in the soil until brought to the surface during cultivation. They have fast reproduction cycles, usually in one year from seed to seed, though some species can have more than one generation in one season. A few species such as groundsel (Senecio vulgaris), shepherd's purse (Capsella bursa-pastoris), red deadnettle (Lamium purpureum) and chickweed (Stellaria media) can survive unharmed through very cold weather and are often able to seed even in winter.

== See also ==
- Crop weed
