= Sonnet 71 =

« » Sonnet 71
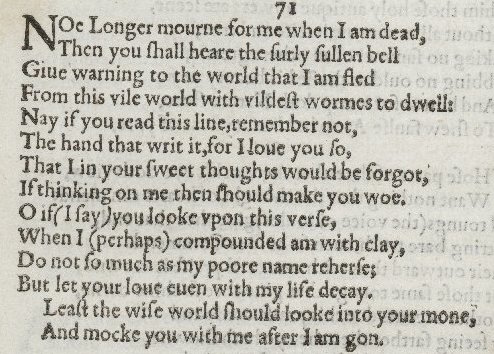
- Sonnet 71 in the 1609 Quarto
Q1
Q2
Q3
C
No longer mourn for me when I am dead
Than you shall hear the surly sullen bell
Give warning to the world that I am fled
From this vile world, with vilest worms to dwell:
Nay, if you read this line, remember not
The hand that writ it; for I love you so,
That I in your sweet thoughts would be forgot,
If thinking on me then should make you woe.
O, if, I say, you look upon this verse
When I perhaps compounded am with clay,
Do not so much as my poor name rehearse,
But let your love even with my life decay;
Lest the wise world should look into your moan,
And mock you with me after I am gone.
—William Shakespeare
4
8
12
14

Sonnet 71 is one of 154 sonnets written by the English playwright and poet William Shakespeare. It's a member of the Fair Youth sequence, in which the poet expresses his love towards a young man. It focuses on the speaker's aging and impending death in relation to his young lover.

== Synopsis ==
Shakespeare's sonnet cycle has overarching themes of great love and the passage of time. In this sonnet, the speaker is now concentrating on his own death and how the youth is to mourn him after he is deceased. The speaker tells the youth not to mourn for him when he is dead, and that the youth should only think about him for as long as it takes to tell the world of his death. The speaker then tells his beloved youth that if even reading this sonnet will cause him to suffer, he should forget the hand that wrote the poem. Joseph Pequigney writes that the sonnet is a "persuasive appeal to be recalled, loved and lamented…a covert counterthesis". Stephen Booth calls this sonnet "a cosmic caricature of a revenging lover." While many critics agree with Peguiney and Booth, and have said that this sonnet is a veiled attempt on the part of the speaker to actually invoke the youth to mourn him, some critics believe differently. Helen Vendler writes that "There are also, I believe, sonnets of hapless love--intended as such by the author, expressed as such by the speaker."

== Structure ==
Sonnet 71 is an English or Shakespearean sonnet. The English sonnet has three quatrains, followed by a final rhyming couplet. It follows the typical rhyme scheme of the form, abab cdcd efef gg and is composed in iambic pentameter, a type of poetic metre based on five pairs of metrically weak/strong syllabic positions. The first line exemplifies a regular iambic pentameter:

 ×  /  ×   /     ×   /   ×  / ×   / 
No longer mourn for me when I am dead (71.1)

/ = ictus, a metrically strong syllabic position. × = nonictus.

== Context ==
Sonnet 71 is one of the first 126 sonnets which address the putative young man. It is more specifically a part of four sonnets (71-74), which are "humble bids for affection, cast in tones of deepest gloom." Sonnets 71 and 72 are linked: a double sonnet. Krieger explains the poet's pleas to the beloved friend to cooperate with time and the world in two ways. He pleads for him to not allow love to outlast the poet's life and to not bestow more values on the poet and his work than is warranted. Essentially the poet in Sonnet 71 develops the idea that he is one of the causes as to why the youth "is suspect of the wise world."

== Analysis ==
=== Quatrain 1 ===
No longer mourn for me when I am dead
Than you shall hear the surly sullen bell
Give warning to the world that I am fled
From this vile world, with vilest worms to dwell:

According to Guyer, the first line says that once the speaker of the sonnets is dead there should be no mourning, but it is phrased in such a way that says the mourning is happening now, at a point in life and living. Guyer's interpretation focuses heavily on time and the importance of that time used for mourning. In the line there is a limit of time being set aside for mourning, only in life, but after life has ended the mourning must stop. The line ends in dead, finality, giving the false sense that the sentence is over and yet it continues through to the second line. The second line gives the brief time between life and the sound of the bell to mourn and it seems to contradict the first line. The sonnet seems to be firmly against mourning after death, but really it is for mourning the dead but only in a timely manner. "The sonnet's first-person subject demands that mourning—even if it lasts only for one minute or one day—coincides with, rather than succeed, the death knell that will "Give warning to the world that I am fled."

Guyer continues on to say that the "Giving warning", describes the bell's message and follows the imperative tense of the first line, [You] give warning mirrors [you] no longer mourn. "The bell that marks the death also marks the duration of the addressee's mourning, and thus sounds a second obligation." The word fled insinuates a presence not no longer existing but being off and gone somewhere else or displaced, an absence. The use of the word dead implies there is no return, while the use of fled opens possibilities of returning. The last line of the first quatrain follows the fled term, "fled", or fleeing from a "vile" world and insinuates that the next world is even worse as it is where the vilest worms dwell. This creates the question of if it is any better after death than it was in life.

Booth takes a different approach to the sonnets. He suggests that the entire sonnet is an "emblem of the poets self-mocking tactics. He argues that though the sonnet works to remind the reader to forget the speaker, it is also contradicts as it constantly reminds the reader of the speaker. His comment on the reading of the first quatrain is that, the experience of reading the poem "an experience of being unable to get on to something new." Booth sees the "Give warning" not only as a literal warning of death but a comment of mortality, "an idea that undercuts the advice the speaker purports to offer by inviting a wider view of all particular deaths that his mundane premises allow for." This reading takes a particular view of the speaker and highlights the theme of aging in the sonnets.

=== Quatrain 2 ===
Nay, if you read this line, remember not
The hand that writ it; for I love you so
That I in your sweet thoughts would be forgot
If thinking on me then should make you woe.

In quatrain two, the speaker implores the young man to forget the hand that wrote the sonnet if the mere thought of the speaker would cause him to mourn. This is particularly ironic considering that there are lines in other sonnets (e.g., Sonnet 18, Sonnet 55, Sonnet 65 and Sonnet 81) that speak of immortality through poetic verse, thus negating the possibility that one can be forgotten.

These examples give credence to Peguiney's argument of a calculated attempt to invoke the youth's mourning, as he writes in his essay Sonnets 71–74, "The 'if' clauses at lines 5 and 9 are cunning invitations to future readings of the verse, and how impossible it would be for 'you [to] read this [handwritten] line' and 'remember not / The hand that writ it'" (p 287). In this same vein, Stephen Booth writes that the "narcissistic smugness of the speaker's gesture of selflessness is made ridiculously apparent by the logic of the situation he evokes: a survivor rereading a poem about forgetting the deceased speaker must necessarily be reminded of him."

Conversely, Helen Vendler, in her book The Art of Shakespeare's Sonnets, writes that this sonnet can indeed be read honestly, that is, as a real-life love predicament wherein two lovers are having a candid discussion of their love for one another. Here, she writes a suicidal dialogue from which she infers the sonnet could have been written:

Poet: I am going to flee this vile world, preferring a dwelling with vilest worms to any further existence here. What will you do after my death?
Beloved: I will mourn you forever.
Poet: No, mourn for me no longer than it takes to toll my passing bell.
Beloved: Well, then I will read your lines, and grieve while reading them.
Poet: Nay, if you read this line, remember not the hand that wrote it, if that memory would cause you grief.
Beloved: Then I will, from love, mention your name to others.
Poet: No, do not rehearse my name, but let your love for me cease when me life does.
Beloved: Why do you forbid me to remember you, grieve for you, read you, name you?
Poet: Because the world, which has so mocked me, will then associate you with me, and you will find yourself by association.

This reading is also possible, as the speaker in other sonnets did speak of his name having a stigma attached to it (Sonnet 111), of being despised and disgraced by men (Sonnet 29), and also of being battered and oppressed by the world (Sonnet 27 and Sonnet 28).

=== Quatrain 3 ===
O, if, I say, you look upon this verse
When I perhaps compounded am with clay,
Do not so much as my poor name rehearse.
But let your love even with my life decay,

Throughout the entire sonnet there seems to be a movement of mourning from very real and apparent to basically vanished. By quatrain 3 the subject "narrows from the hand to the mere name [of the speaker]—as if to render the mourning ever more tenuous, while having the beloved still enact the putatively wished-for behavior." Vendler points out the increasingly distanced view of the speaker and his expression. By this quatrain "the speaker is wholly compounded… with clay, dissolved into dust."

The sonnet as a whole leads the reader's mind and emotion to the climax, line 12. It is in this line that there is an affirmation of the return of love. The line reads "let your love even with my life decay." With this affirmation of the return of love comes the "advice to terminate it".

As par the structure of this particular quatrain, it seems to tie the sonnet all together. As Ingram illustrates, "line 10 look[s] back to lines 1-4" and "line 11 and 12 to the gentler, un-self-regarding tone of lines 5-8." Additionally, these lines within quatrain three contrast because of line 10's "harsh alliterating c's and echoic 'compounded'" and line 12's "soft alliterating l's". Atkins adds "as Ingram and Redpath note, [there is] a great variety of stress, supplying a fluidity that, surprisingly perhaps, allows the author to keep the third quatrain's interloped feet ('I say' [line 9], 'perhaps' [line 10]) and reversed word order ('compounded am' [line 10]) from appearing clumsy."

=== Couplet ===
Lest the wise world should look into your moan
And mock you with me after I am gone.

The couplet tie at the end of the sonnet "sums up the poem: look, mourn (moan), world". By the couplet "[the speaker] is gone, no longer corporeal at all." While the quatrains lead up to a climax in quatrain 3, the couplet suggests a point, a succinct conclusion. According to Atkins, in the couplet "The primary notion is that the world will judge the poet's shortcoming only too well," as clarified by Tucker [1924]. After the speaker's urge for the beloved not to mourn him, one might expect several different orthodox explanations at the conclusion. Instead of what is expected "we get: 'Forget me when I am dead – after all, someone might make fun of you.'"

Alternately, Pequigney believes "the answer [as to what the couplet means] depends on our mood as we read it." He maintains that "we learn more about ourselves when we interpret this poem than we do about its author."

Finally, the couplet may be read as reflecting the shame imposed on same-sex love by some, and a desire by the author to spare the young man the cruel harshness of such mockery.

Overall, "the couplet is superbly organized, both in the management of its rhythms and in its backward verbal reflection to the patterning of the whole poem."

== Irony ==
There seems to be a couple different types of irony in the sonnets in general that which is "openly voiced by the speaker and authorial irony suggested at the expense of the (deceived) speaker." There seems to a sense of irony when the speaker tells the beloved to forget him. Schoenfeldt reasons that "we cannot quite take these lines literally" because "to tell someone to forget something is to make it harder for them to forget." This demonstrates a certain "reverse-psychology appeal" as a sense of irony. Furthermore "the shift from the 'vile world' (line 4) to the 'wise world' (line 13) is the final evidence of Shakespeare's irony" in this particular sonnet. Krieger goes on to explain: "For this world is wise—that is, shrewd, prudential—only as it is vile, only as it exercises those characteristics which ape the destructive perfection, the absolute cooperation with time, of the 'vilest worms.'" He questions, "How single-mindedly, then, is his friend to take this selfless, seemingly anti-sentimental injunction to obey the dictates of the world's cold wisdom lest he be mocked by it?"

== Interpretations ==
- Peter Bowles, for the 2002 compilation album, When Love Speaks (EMI)

=== In Music ===
Poeterra recorded a pop ballad version of Sonnet 71 on their album "When in Disgrace" (2014).

Milton Babbitt's A Solo Requiem begins and ends with settings of Sonnet 71.

The lyrics from the song Dead Boy's Poem on symphonic metal band Nightwish' album Wishmaster quote this sonnet.
