= Sonnet 64 =

« » Sonnet 64
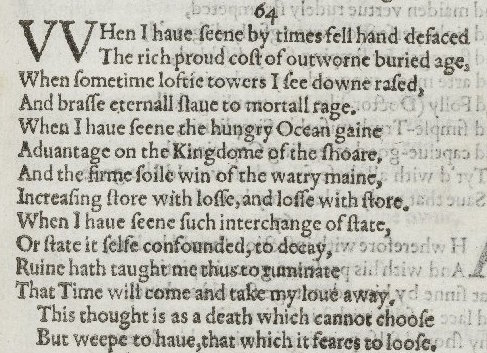
- Sonnet 64 in the 1609 Quarto
Q1
Q2
Q3
C
When I have seen by Time’s fell hand defaced
The rich-proud cost of outworn buried age;
When sometime lofty towers I see down-razed,
And brass eternal slave to mortal rage;
When I have seen the hungry ocean gain
Advantage on the kingdom of the shore,
And the firm soil win of the watery main,
Increasing store with loss and loss with store;
When I have seen such interchange of state,
Or state itself confounded to decay;
Ruin hath taught me thus to ruminate,
That Time will come and take my love away.
This thought is as a death, which cannot choose
But weep to have that which it fears to lose.
—William Shakespeare
4
8
12
14

Sonnet 64 is one of 154 sonnets written by the English playwright and poet William Shakespeare. It is a member of the Fair Youth sequence, in which the poet expresses his love towards a young man.

== Synopsis ==
The opening quatrain begins with the personification of time, a destroyer of great things built by man, a force man cannot equal. The second quatrain portrays a victorless struggle between the sea and the land. In the last quatrain the speaker applies these lessons to his own situation, realizing that death is inevitable and time will come and take his love away. The concluding couplet, in contrast to Shakespeare's typical practice, provides no solution, no clever twist; only inevitable tears.

== Structure ==
Sonnet 64 is an English or Shakespearean sonnet. The English sonnet has three quatrains, followed by a final rhyming couplet. It follows the typical rhyme scheme of the form, abab cdcd efef gg and is composed in iambic pentameter, a type of poetic metre based on five pairs of metrically weak/strong syllabic positions. The fourth line exemplifies a regular iambic pentameter:

×     /   × /  ×    /    ×  /  ×   / 
And brass eternal slave to mortal rage; (64.4)

/ = ictus, a metrically strong syllabic position. × = nonictus.

The seventh line has both the first ictus moved to the right (resulting in a four-position figure, × × / /, sometimes referred to as a minor ionic), and a mid-line reversal. This creates a somewhat unusual case in which three stressed syllables in a row function as three ictuses, rather than one of them being demoted (as typically happens) to a nonictus.

×     ×  /    /    /  ×    ×  /   ×  / 
And the firm soil win of the watery main, (64.7)

The meter demands a few variant pronunciations: The third line's "towers" functions as one syllable, and the seventh line's "watery" as two.

== Analysis and criticism ==
The critic T. W. Baldwin explains that Sonnet 64 deals with Shakespeare's struggle against time, which he "cannot withstand". He also presents the idea of the revolution of sea and land, although not many other critics agree. Sonnet 64 catalogues instances of inevitable destruction so as to provide a consolation for death and places "emphasis on the inescapable fact of mutability". Because of the inevitability and finality of death, Shakespeare's lover is not choosing to leave him. On the contrary, his lover could not do anything about it. In this way, Shakespeare is able to feel better about himself, because the love of his life was taken from him involuntarily. However, Sonnet 64 does not specify whether Shakespeare is more upset over the loss of life or the loss of love.

Most critics place Sonnet 64 in a chronological sequence or group with Sonnets 62–74. Both T. W. Baldwin and Emily Stockard agree that these sonnets are similar in subject and tone. However, another critic, Brents Stirling, disagrees. He places Sonnet 64 in a sonnet group containing only Sonnets 63–68. He argues that these sonnets should be grouped together because they are the only ones to refer to the subject of the poem in the third person rather than second person. Sonnet 64 is very similar to Shakespeare's Sonnet 60 where both sonnets focus on a central idolizing of "time as the destroyer". In Helen Vendler's, The Art of Shakespeare's Sonnets, Vendler describes Sonnet 64 to be written in a state of horror and "unprotected vulnerability". The speaker's horror is manifested in the line, Increasing store with loss, and loss with store. Vendler argues that in this line "Loss wins in both cases. It is of course impossible to increase abundance with loss, and equally impossible to increase loss by adding abundance to it." Atkins is also in agreement that sonnet 64 especially in line 12, the speaker expresses a state of fear: That Time will come and take my love away. In "Shakespeare's Sonnets" Atkins argues the meaning of this line is clear that "after seeing all these other ruins, I think about your eventual ruin". Vendler calls line 12 a "collapse into monosyllabic truth", "and its dismayed adolescent simplicity of rhythm, this line feels like a death." Booth claims that in line 13 is unclear: "death, the nearest potential antecedent, cannot choose, but it cannot weep or fear either; thought makes better sense, but it is the thinker who does the weeping and fearing." Vendler argues that in the last three lines of the sonnet a "'natural' pattern of unreversed ruin 'defeats' the intellectual mastery-by-chiasmus, as the concept of gradual leakage comes to represent personal loss. Time takes love away, a thought is like a death, one weeps to have what one fears to lose.... Having while fearing to lose is already a form of losing." Overall, both Booth and Vendler agree in the last three lines of the sonnet the speaker weeps at the fear of losing his love, ultimately realizing that he cannot escape time and time will come and take his love away.

=== The couplet ===
This thought is as a death, which cannot choose
But weep to have that which it fears to lose. (64.13-14)

William Shakespeare's Sonnet 64 scrutinizes the idea of losing his loved one to Time, and views Time as an agent of Death. Shakespeare's reference to 'outworn buried age' demonstrates the idea of his loved one being consumed or worn out by time and age. According to Helen Vendler, it seems that "the first twelve lines [are] a long defense – by thinking about the end of inanimate things – against thinking about the death of a living person". As James Grimshaw analyzes the final two lines, Shakespeare substitutes the word which for death in the couplet, adding more emphasis on the sonnet's theme of death as an overpowering force. The love he is losing could have one of two meanings: it could either be the true death of his beloved, or in fact simply the love he has for his beloved. Vendler interprets this death as the death of his beloved, in which the couplet justly displays this as Shakespeare's genuine concern, thus distinctly separating itself from the previous twelve lines. Shakespeare's dread of time and age taking away his praised beloved seems to alarm him above all of the other entities he observes throughout his Sonnet 64, though he despairs in the idea that losing him is beyond his control.

=== Phonetic play in "Ruin hath taught me thus to ruminate" ===
Sonnet 64 is a great example of why people always say "You should never let your past interfere with your present". Barret argues that sonnet 64 "provides an example of past-oriented natural habitats that might interfere with the productive considerations of the future". In other words, because the speaker is letting the past overwhelm his thoughts, he therefore cannot think positively about the future due to past habits or tendencies. Unlike some of the other sonnets addressed to the young man, sonnet 64 moves toward a feeling of the lover's exposure to the risk of being destroyed. Barret also argues that the phonetic play between ruminate and ruinate is as she says an "underscore a relationship inherent in the poem’s logic", "Each quatrain of the sonnet open with the same construction — "When I have seen" — yet these statements are never met with a summational "then", so the temporal ambiguity the phrase creates the remains unresolved: Does the speaker gesture toward repeated past actions ('in the instances that I have seen') or forward to a causational limit point ('once I have seen')?". When we read the lines that pertain to the waves and the shore, "at times the waves are winning against the shore, and then at times the shore is winning against the waves", the speaker almost speaks in a tone of confidence and determination to not let time control his life. Although when he goes to say Time will take my love away we begin to get a sense of uncertainty within the speaker. This uncertainty within the speaker is described by Barret when she argues "The sonnet registers temporal matters in personal terms; the couplet never corrects the poem's grammatically obscured engagement with time, but instead introduces a paralyzing temporal collapse: the present moment becomes overwhelmed by an anticipation of future loss—an extreme version of 'I miss you already.'.... The ruin/ruminate pairing bespeaks a suspicion of an imagined time spent looking back".

== Bibliography ==
- Baldwin, T. W. On the Literary Genetics of Shakespeare's Poems and Sonnets. Urbana (IL): University of Illinois Press; 1950. pp. 279, 353.
- Barret J.K. 'So written to aftertimes': Renaissance England's Poetics of Futurity. Annarbor(MI): ProQuest LLC.; 2008. pp. 13–16
- Fontana, E. "Shakespeare's Sonnet 55." The Explicator v. 45 (Spring 1987), pp. 6–8
- Grimshaw, James. "Amphibiology in Shakespeare's Sonnet 64." Shakespeare Quarterly, Vol. 25, No. 1 (Winter, 1974), pp. 127–129.
- Stirling, Brents. "A Shakespeare Sonnet Group." PMLA, Vol. 75, No. 4 (1960). pp. 340–349.
- Stockard, Emily. Patterns of Consolation in Shakespeare's Sonnets 1–126. Studies in Philology, Vol. 94, No. 4 (1997). pp. 465–493.

First edition and facsimile

- Shakespeare, William (1609). Shake-speares Sonnets: Never Before Imprinted. London: Thomas Thorpe.
- Lee, Sidney, ed. (1905). Shakespeares Sonnets: Being a reproduction in facsimile of the first edition. Oxford: Clarendon Press. OCLC 458829162.

Variorum editions

- Alden, Raymond Macdonald, ed. (1916). The Sonnets of Shakespeare. Boston: Houghton Mifflin Harcourt. OCLC 234756.
- Rollins, Hyder Edward, ed. (1944). A New Variorum Edition of Shakespeare: The Sonnets [2 Volumes]. Philadelphia: J. B. Lippincott & Co. OCLC 6028485. — Volume I and Volume II at the Internet Archive

Modern critical editions

- Atkins, Carl D., ed. (2007). Shakespeare's Sonnets: With Three Hundred Years of Commentary. Madison: Fairleigh Dickinson University Press. ISBN 978-0-8386-4163-7. OCLC 86090499.
- Booth, Stephen, ed. (2000) [1st ed. 1977]. Shakespeare's Sonnets (Rev. ed.). New Haven: Yale Nota Bene. ISBN 0-300-01959-9. OCLC 2968040.
- Burrow, Colin, ed. (2002). The Complete Sonnets and Poems. The Oxford Shakespeare. Oxford: Oxford University Press. ISBN 978-0192819338. OCLC 48532938.
- Duncan-Jones, Katherine, ed. (2010) [1st ed. 1997]. Shakespeare's Sonnets. Arden Shakespeare, third series (Rev. ed.). London: Bloomsbury. ISBN 978-1-4080-1797-5. OCLC 755065951. — 1st edition at the Internet Archive
- Evans, G. Blakemore, ed. (1996). The Sonnets. The New Cambridge Shakespeare. Cambridge: Cambridge University Press. ISBN 978-0521294034. OCLC 32272082.
- Kerrigan, John, ed. (1995) [1st ed. 1986]. The Sonnets ; and, A Lover's Complaint. New Penguin Shakespeare (Rev. ed.). Penguin Books. ISBN 0-14-070732-8. OCLC 15018446.
- Mowat, Barbara A.; Werstine, Paul, eds. (2006). Shakespeare's Sonnets & Poems. Folger Shakespeare Library. New York: Washington Square Press. ISBN 978-0743273282. OCLC 64594469.
- Orgel, Stephen, ed. (2001). The Sonnets. The Pelican Shakespeare (Rev. ed.). New York: Penguin Books. ISBN 978-0140714531. OCLC 46683809.
- Vendler, Helen, ed. (1997). The Art of Shakespeare's Sonnets. Cambridge, Massachusetts: The Belknap Press of Harvard University Press. ISBN 0-674-63712-7. OCLC 36806589.
