= Sonnet 67 =

« » Sonnet 67
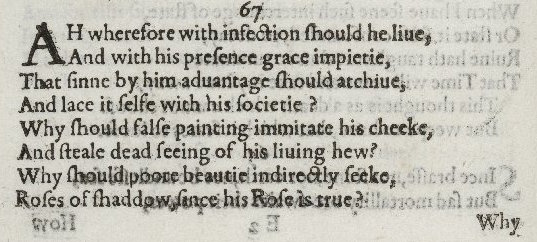
- The first two stanzas of Sonnet 67 in the 1609 Quarto
Q1
Q2
Q3
C
Ah, wherefore with infection should he live
And with his presence grace impiety,
That sin by him advantage should achieve
And lace itself with his society?
Why should false painting imitate his cheek,
And steal dead seeing of his living hue?
Why should poor beauty indirectly seek
Roses of shadow, since his rose is true?
Why should he live, now Nature bankrupt is,
Beggar’d of blood to blush through lively veins?
For she hath no exchequer now but his,
And, proud of many, lives upon his gains.
O, him she stores, to show what wealth she had
In days long since, before these last so bad.
—William Shakespeare
4
8
12
14

Sonnet 67 is one of 154 sonnets written by the English playwright and poet William Shakespeare. It's a member of the Fair Youth sequence, in which the poet expresses his love towards a young man and is a thematic continuation of Sonnet 66. In this poem, the speaker's anxiety about the social difference between him and his beloved takes the form of a criticism of courtly corruption. This sonnet was placed first in the pirated and mangled edition of 1640.

== Structure ==
Sonnet 67 is an English or Shakespearean sonnet. The English sonnet has three quatrains, followed by a final rhyming couplet. It follows the typical rhyme scheme of the form, ABAB CDCD EFEF GG, and is composed in iambic pentameter, a type of poetic metre based on five pairs of metrically weak/strong syllabic positions. The third line exemplifies a regular iambic pentameter:

  ×   /   ×  /  ×  /  ×     /    ×  / 
That sin by him advantage should achieve (67.3)

/ = ictus, a metrically strong syllabic position. × = nonictus.

Line eight exemplifies an initial reversal, of which there are several in this sonnet:

 / ×  ×    / ×    /     ×   /   ×    / 
Roses of shadow, since his rose is true? (67.8)

== Source and analysis ==
Gary Schmidgall notes that the underlying conceit of the sonnet derives from Petrarch, for whom hyperbolic praise is a main part of the stock in trade. For most critics, this theme is in this poem significant as it interacts with another theme, the corruption of the court. This theme, which was prominent in the voguish satire of the 1590s. As he would in Hamlet, Shakespeare draws on the language of abuse derived ultimately from Roman satirists such as Juvenal and Horace. The combination of satiric and romantic language is commonly said to reinforce the speaker's ambivalence about his beloved. M. M. Mahood notes the lexical uncertainty of line 1, which leaves open the possibility that the friend himself is infected. For this reason, Roger Warren points to a thematic similarity to All's Well That Ends Well, whose hero, Bertram, is similarly ambiguous.

"Lace" in line 4 has been glossed various ways. Citing Romeo and Juliet and Macbeth, George Steevens glossed it as "embellish"; Edward Dowden agreed, but George Wyndham has it as "diversify." Wyndham also perceives a reference to the "rival poet" in lines 7–8. In line 8, "seeing" is sometimes amended to "seeming" but more commonly "dead seeing" is glossed as some variation "lifeless appearance."
