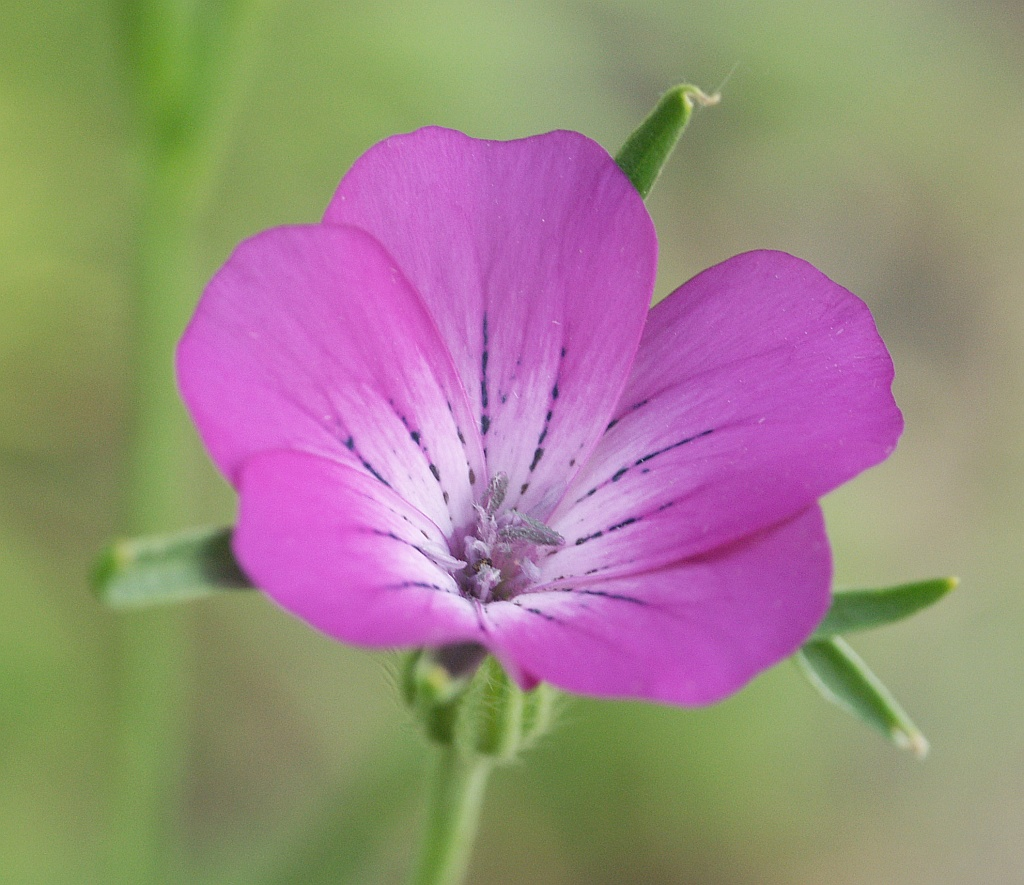

Scientific classification
- Kingdom: Plantae
- Clade: Tracheophytes
- Clade: Angiosperms
- Clade: Eudicots
- Order: Caryophyllales
- Family: Caryophyllaceae
- Genus: Agrostemma
- Species: A. githago

Binomial name
- Agrostemma githago L.

= Agrostemma githago =

Species of flowering plant

Agrostemma githago, the common corn-cockle (also written "corncockle"), is a herbaceous annual flowering plant a member of Caryophyllaceae, also called the pink family or the carnation family of plants. The name of this genus is derived from Greek: agros (ἀγρός) “field” and stemma (στέμμα) “garland, crown."

== Description ==
It grows with a stem to 100 cm (39 in) long with lanceolate leaves. The flowers are up to 5 cm (2.0 in) in diameter, usually single at the ends of the stem. The sepals have five narrow teeth much longer than the petals. It has ten stamens. It has slender pink flowers. It is an erect plant covered with fine hairs. Its few branches are each tipped with a single deep pink to purple flower. The flowers are scentless, 25–50 mm (1.0–2.0 in) across, and produced in the summer months – May to September in the northern hemisphere, November to March in the southern hemisphere.

Each petal bears two or three discontinuous black lines. The five narrow pointed sepals exceed the petals and are joined at the base to form a rigid tube with ten ribs. Leaves are pale green, opposite, narrowly lanceolate, held nearly erect against stem and are 45–145 mm (1.8–5.7 in) long. Seeds are produced in a many-seeded capsule. It can be found in fields, roadsides, railway lines, waste places, and other disturbed areas.

== Ecology ==
In the 19th century, it was reported as a very common weed of European wheat fields and its seeds were inadvertently included in harvested wheat seed and then resown the following season. It is very likely that until the 20th century, most wheat contained some corn cockle seed. It is susceptible to downy mildew caused by the oomycete species Peronospora agrostemmatis.

== Distribution ==
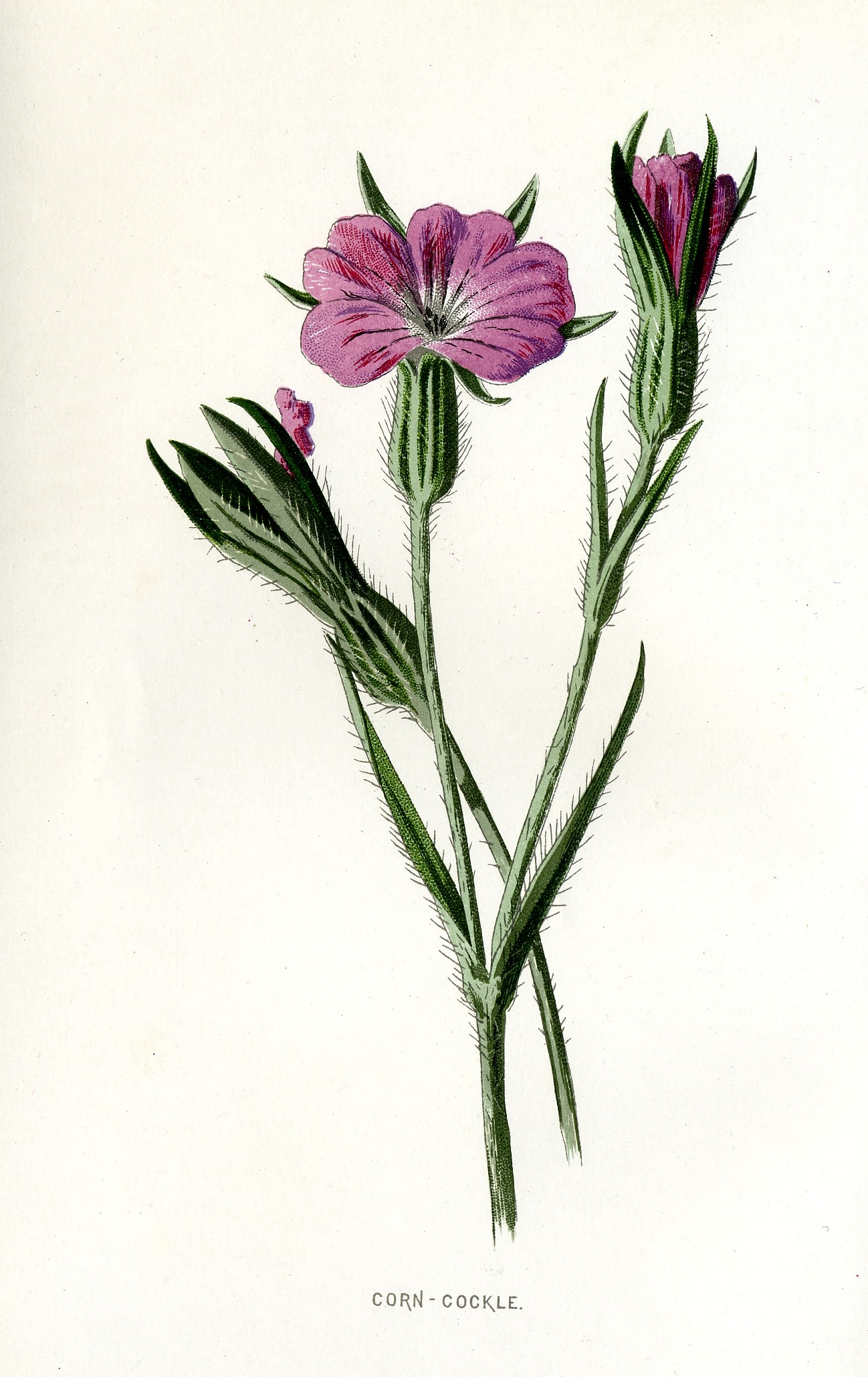
Illustration by F Edward Hulme, 1896

It is now present in many parts of the temperate world as an alien species, probably introduced with imported European wheat. It is known to occur throughout much of the United States and parts of Canada, parts of Australia and New Zealand.

In parts of Europe, intensive mechanized farming has put the plant at risk and it is now uncommon or locally distributed. This is partly due to changing patterns of agriculture with most wheat now sown in the autumn as winter wheat and then harvested before any corn cockle would have flowered or set seed. The main reason, however, is that the cereal seed is better cleaned. The plant was believed to be completely extirpated in the United Kingdom until 2014, when a single specimen was found growing in Sunderland by an assistant ranger of the National Trust.

It can be found in fields, roadsides, railway lines, waste places, and other disturbed areas.

== Toxicity ==
All parts of the plant are poisonous and contain githagin (ribosome-inactivating proteins) and saponins. It has been used in folk medicine despite the risk of fatal poisoning.

== Medicinal properties ==
Recent research highlights the various biological activities of common corncockle, including its cytotoxic effects on cancer cells, protective properties against oxidative stress, inhibition of Leishmania major culture growth, suppression of protein synthesis, and its antiviral, anti-angiogenic, and cholesterol-lowering activities.

Agrostin is a type I ribosome-inactivating protein (RIP) found in the seeds of A. githago. It acts as an RNA N-glycosidase that depurinates the sarcin–ricin loop of 28S rRNA, leading to irreversible inhibition of protein synthesis. Because it lacks the lectin B-chain characteristic of type II RIPs, agrostin enters cells inefficiently and is considerably less toxic than ricin. In vitro studies have reported cytotoxic, antiviral, and anti-angiogenic activities, while synergistic interactions with triterpenoid saponins have attracted interest for the development of targeted therapeutics and immunotoxins.

== See also ==
- List of poisonous plants
