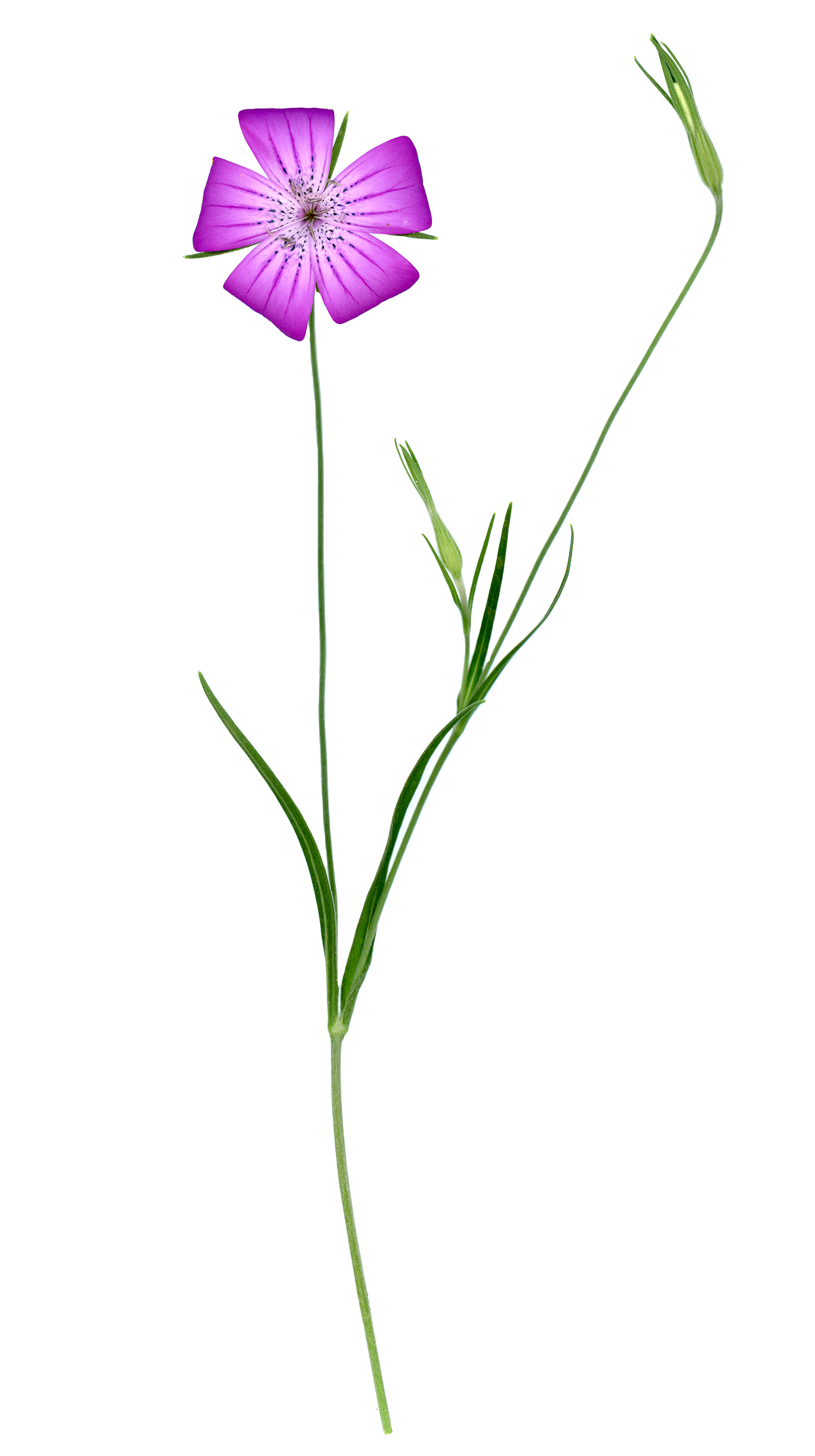

Scientific classification
- Kingdom: Plantae
- Clade: Tracheophytes
- Clade: Angiosperms
- Clade: Eudicots
- Order: Caryophyllales
- Family: Caryophyllaceae
- Genus: Agrostemma; L.

Species
- Several, including: Agrostemma brachyloba; Agrostemma githago; Agrostemma gracile

= Agrostemma =

Corncockles

Genus of flowering plants in the carnation family

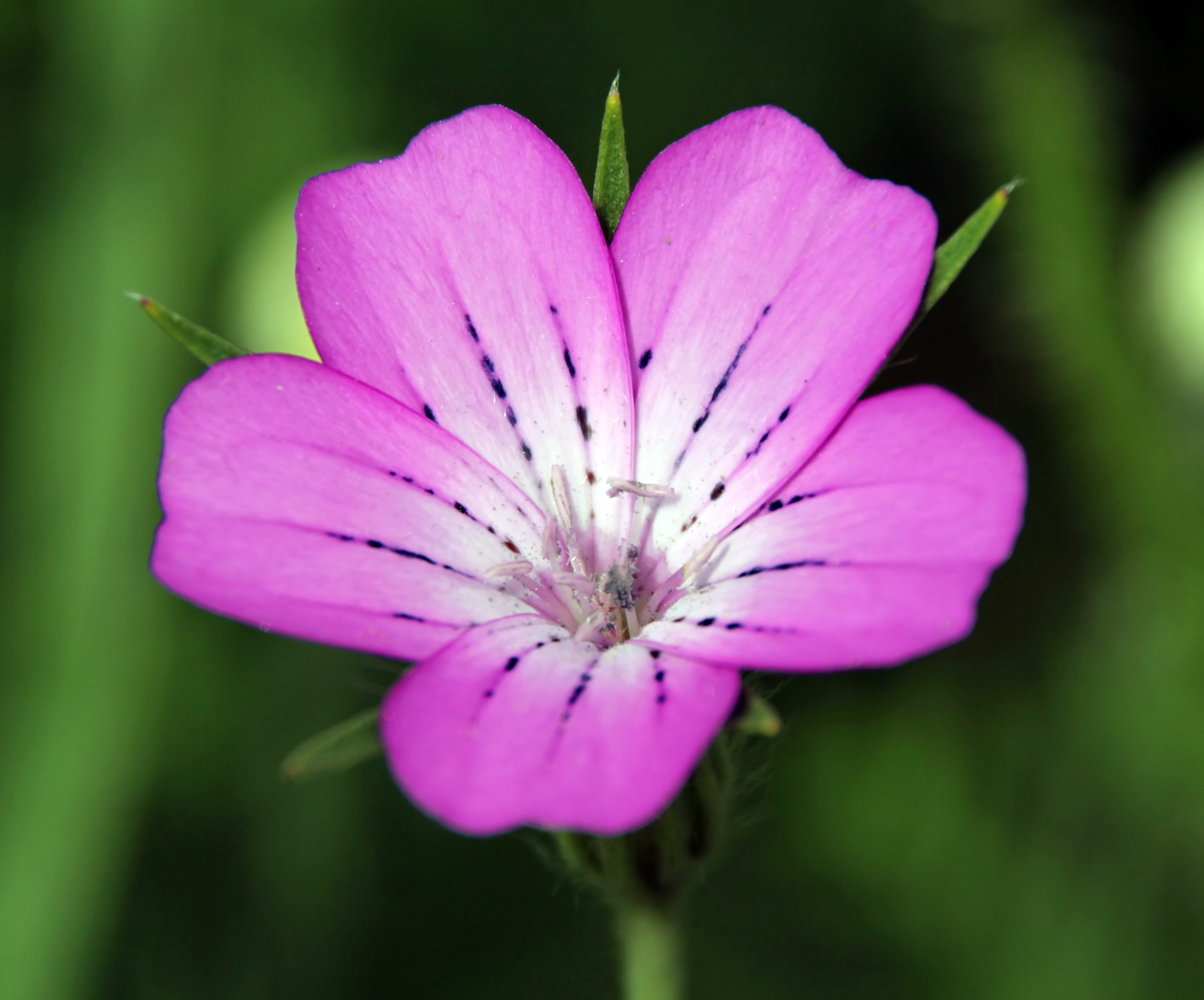
Agrostemma githago

Agrostemma is a genus of annual plants in the family Caryophyllaceae, containing the species known as corncockles. Its best-known member is A. githago, the common corncockle, which is a native of Europe. The species is a weed of cereals and other crops, probably with a centre of origin in the eastern Mediterranean. It occurs as a weed worldwide, but is declining in its native range because of improved seed cleaning. Corncockle is an attractive plant, and its seeds are still commercially available to gardeners.

== Selected species ==
- Agrostemma brachyloba Hammer, narrow corncockle
- Agrostemma githago L., common corncockle, corn-pink

(Agrostemma gracile is a synonym of Agrostemma brachyloba)
