= Barnyard grass =

Barnyard grass is a common name for several plants and may refer to:

- Dactylis glomerata
- Echinochloa crus-galli
