= Sonnet 65 =

« » Sonnet 65
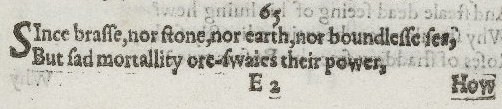
- The first two lines of Sonnet 65 in the 1609 Quarto
Q1
Q2
Q3
C
Since brass, nor stone, nor earth, nor boundless sea,
But sad mortality o’er-sways their power,
How with this rage shall beauty hold a plea
Whose action is no stronger than a flower?
O, how shall summer’s honey breath hold out
Against the wreckful siege of battering days,
When rocks impregnable are not so stout,
Nor gates of steel so strong, but Time decays?
O fearful meditation! where, alack,
Shall Time’s best jewel from Time’s chest lie hid?
Or what strong hand can hold his swift foot back?
Or who his spoil of beauty can forbid?
O, none, unless this miracle have might,
That in black ink my love may still shine bright.
—William Shakespeare
4
8
12
14

Sonnet 65 is one of 154 sonnets written by the English playwright and poet William Shakespeare. It is a member of the Fair Youth sequence, in which the poet expresses his love towards a young man.

== Synopsis ==
This sonnet is a continuation of Sonnet 64, and is an influential poem on the aspect of Time's destruction. Shakespeare also offers an escape from Time's clasp in his end couplet, suggesting that the love and human emotion he has used through his writing will test Time and that through the years the black ink will still shine bright. Shakespeare begins this sonnet by listing several seemingly vast and unbreakable things which are destroyed by time, then asking what chance beauty has of escaping the same fate. A main theme is that many things are powerful, but nothing remains in this universe forever, especially not a fleeting emotion such as love. Mortality rules over the universe and everything is perishable in this world, so it is only through the timeless art of writing that emotion and beauty can be preserved.

== Structure ==
Sonnet 65 is an English or Shakespearean sonnet. The English sonnet has three quatrains, followed by a final rhyming couplet. It follows the typical rhyme scheme of the form, abab cdcd efef gg and is composed in iambic pentameter, a type of poetic metre based on five pairs of metrically weak/strong syllabic positions. The first line exemplifies a regular iambic pentameter:

 ×      /     ×    /     ×  /       ×   /    ×    / 
Since brass, nor stone, nor earth, nor boundless sea, (65.1)

/ = ictus, a metrically strong syllabic position. × = nonictus.

The tenth line exhibits a rightward movement of the third ictus (the resulting four-position figure, × × / /, is sometimes referred to as a minor ionic):

  ×    /      ×    / ×    ×   /       /    ×   / 
Shall Time's best jewel from Time's chest lie hid? (65.10)

This figure may also be detected in lines eleven and fourteen, along with an initial reversal in line three.

== Analysis ==
=== Relation to adjacent sonnets ===
Time is not an innocuous entity. Here in Sonnet 65 Shakespeare shows time's cruel ravages on all that we believe is enduring. According to Lowry Nelson Jr., Sonnet 65 is simply a continuation of Sonnet 64 and he argues that "both poems are meditations on the theme of time's destructiveness". He also explains that "Sonnet 65 makes use of the same words [brass, rage, hand, love] and more or less specific notions, but it proceeds and culminates far more impressively," in comparison to Sonnet 64. The last two couplets are Shakespeare's own summary on the theme that love itself is a "miracle" that time nor human intervention can destroy.

Shakespeare critic Brents Stirling expands on Lowry's idea by placing sonnet 65 in a distinct group among the sonnets presumably addressed to Shakespeare's young friend, because of the strictly third-person mode of address. Stirling links sonnets 63-68 through their use of "uniform epithet, 'my love' or its variants such as 'my beloved' ". In sonnet 65, the pronoun 'his' directly references the epithet. "Sonnet 65 opens with an epitome of [sonnet] 64: 'Since brass nor stone nor earth nor boundless sea..." The opening line refers back to the 'brass,' 'lofty towers,' 'firm soil,' and 'wat'ry main' of 64. 'This rage' of 'sad mortality' calls to mind the 'mortal rage' of 64. "After its development of 64, sonnet 65 returns with its couplet to the couplet of 63: 'That in black ink my love may still shine bright' echoes 'His beauty' that 'shall in these black lines be seen'; and 'still shine' recalls 'still green' ". This "triad" of poems relates to the group of sonnets 66–68, for "Their respective themes, Time's ruin (63-65) and the Former Age, a pristine earlier world now in ruin and decay (66-68), were conventionally associated in Shakespeare's day," suggesting that the sonnets were written as a related group meant to be distinctly categorised.

=== Verbal patterns ===
Shakespearean scholar Helen Vendler characterises Sonnet 65 as a "defective key word" sonnet. Often, Shakespeare will use a particular word prominently in each quatrain, prompting the reader to look for it in the couplet and note any change in usage. Here, however, he repeats the words "hold" and "strong" (modified slightly to "stronger" in Q1), but omits them in the couplet, thus rendering them "defective." Vendler claims that these key words are replaced by "miracle" and "black ink" respectively in the quatrain, citing as evidence the shift of focus from organic to inorganic, which parallels the same shift occurring more broadly from the octave to the sestet, as well as the presence of the letters i, a, c, and l visually yoking miracle to black ink. Stephen Booth supports this line of criticism, noting the juxtaposition of "hand" and "foot" in line 11, suggesting someone being tripped up and perhaps mirroring the shift to come in the couplet.

Barry Adams furthers the characterisation of Sonnet 65 as somehow disrupted or defective, noting the usage of "O" to begin the second and third quatrains and the couplet, but not the first quatrain. He also notes the paradoxical nature of this device: "The effect of this last verbal repetition is to modify (if not nullify) the normal 4+4+4+2 structure of the English or Shakespearean sonnet by blurring the distinction between couplet and quatrain. Yet the argumentative structure of the poem insists on that distinction, since the concluding couplet is designed precisely to qualify or even contradict the observations in the first three quatrains.".

Joel Fineman treats Sonnet 65 as epideictic. He injects cynicism into the Fair Youth sonnets, claiming that the speaker does not believe fully in the immortalising power of his verse; that it is merely literary and ultimately unreal. He treats the "still" in line 14 as wordplay, reading it to mean "dead, unmoving" rather than "perpetual, eternal". There is some scholarly debate over this point, though. Carl Atkins, for example, writes that the reader is "not to take the couplet's 'unless' seriously. We are not expected to have any doubt that the 'miracle' of making the beloved shine brightly in black ink has might. Of course it does - we have been told so before. 'Who can hold back time?' the speaker asks. 'No one, except me,' is the answer". Philip Martin tends toward agreement with Atkins, but refutes the suggestion that the reader is "not to take the couplet's 'unless' seriously," asserting instead that, "the poem's ending is...deliberately and properly tentative". Murray Krieger agrees with Martin's point that, "the end of 65 is stronger precisely because it is so tentative". "The soft, almost non-consonantal 'how shall summer's honey breath hold out' " offers no resistance to Time's 'wrackful siege of batt'ring days'. Krieger suggests that while the sonnet does not resist Time through an assertion of strength, the concession of weakness by the placement of hope solely on a 'miracle,' offers an appeal against Time: "May there not be a strength that arises precisely from the avoidance of it?".

=== Connection to The Tragedy of Julius Cæsar ===
.

Time is a natural force from which none of us is immune. This theme pervades the sonnet; the speaker recognises that time will strip the beloved of his beauty and by saying that implies that time will take his beloved from him. Eventually, time will consume everyone in death, and, whether one chooses to recognise it or not, he will not have any control over exactly when that consumption will take place. This theme translates to Julius Caesar as well. Caesar is unfazed by the soothsayer's proclamation in act one, and even though Calpurnia seems for a time to have succeeded in keeping Caesar home on the day of his eventual murder, he goes to Senate anyway. Caesar walks into his own death, much less literally than Brutus, who does actually walk into the sword that kills him. But in these deaths in the context of the play serve to elucidate the truth that death (or 'Time', as the sonnet refers to it) will consume you regardless of your ambitions or future plans; it does not take you into consideration. Obviously, Caesar would not have gone to Senate if he knew he would be stabbed upon entering, just as Brutus and Cassius would not have engaged in a full-blown war if they knew they would be dead before it was over.

It is coincidental enough that the speaker suggests that the only way to immortalise his beloved as he is, is through his writing. And the way that Caesar and the others are kept alive is through writing, through history, and in some senses through Shakespeare himself.

It is rather universally accepted that a body of Shakespeare's sonnets, including 65, are addressed to a young man whose beauty the poems make known. The young man is like Caesar, then, in that Shakespeare recognises the presence of feminine qualities in a man. But the common theme is more than recognition, it is an acknowledgment of tension created by that recognition. Especially by Cassius, Caesar is made out to be rather feminine, as is the young man in descriptions of his beauty. In that the speaker does not directly refer to the addressee of the sonnets as a man, and in that Brutus and the others find discomfort in Caesar's ruling ability because of his appeared weaknesses, shows that Shakespeare recognises an anxiety about men with feminine qualities, or women with masculine qualities, like Queen Elizabeth, of whom Caesar may or may not be representative.

== Interpretations ==
- Jonathan Pryce, for the 2002 compilation album, When Love Speaks (EMI Classics)
