= The Explicator =

- Discipline: literary criticism
- Language: English

Publication details
- History: 1942 to present
- Publisher: Taylor & Francis (United States)
- Frequency: Quarterly

Standard abbreviations
- ISO 4: Explicator

Indexing
- ISSN: 0014-4940 (print); 1939-926X (web)

Links
- Journal homepage

The Explicator is a peer-reviewed, quarterly journal of literary criticism. It began publication in October 1942 and is now both printed and available in an electronic version. Routledge acquired the journal from Heldref Publications in 2009, and now it is owned by Taylor & Francis. Issues often include between 25 and 30 articles on works of literature, "ranging from ancient Greek and Roman times to our own, from throughout the world." According to a library guide, "As the title of the journal suggests, the focus is on explication, or close readings, of the works. As such, the articles tend to use less jargon and are easier to understand than some other articles in literature studies."

Editor-in-Chief

Leonard Neidorf, Shenzhen University, China

Managing Editor

Na Xu, Nanjing University, China

Nana Jin, Shenzhen University, China

Associate Editors

William Baker, Northern Illinois University, USA

Florence Bourgne, Sorbonne Université, France

Jonathan Chua, Ateneo de Manila University, The Philippines

Jayda Coons, University of Tennessee, USA

Emma Depledge, Université de Neuchâtel, Switzerland

Darren Freebury-Jones, Shakespeare Birthplace Trust, UK

M.A.R. Habib, Rutgers University, USA

Magda Hasabelnaby, Ain Shams University, Egypt

Ning He, Nanjing University, China

Jessica Hemming, Corpus Christi College, Canada

Carole Hough, Glasgow University, UK

Sandro Jung, Fudan University, China

Klaudia Lee, City University of Hong Kong, China

Francis Leneghan, University of Oxford, UK

Rafael J. Pascual, Universidad de Granada, Spain

Ingo Peters, Chulalongkorn University, Thailand

Chitra Sankaran, National University of Singapore, Singapore

Matthew Sussman, University of Sydney, Australia

Ato Quayson, Stanford University, USA

Susan J. Wolfson, Princeton University, USA

The Explicator is abstracted/indexed in: Clarivate Analytics: Arts & Humanities Citation Index® and Current Contents/Arts & Humanities®Dietrich's Index Philosophicus; EBSCOhost Online Research Databases; Elsevier: Scopus; Gale Cengage: Academic ASAP, Academic OneFile, Expanded Academic ASAP, General OneFile, General Reference Center, General Reference Center Gold, General Reference Centre International, InfoTrac Custom, InfoTrac Student Edition, Shakespeare Collection, Student Resource Center: College Edition; H.W. Wilson: Book Review Digest Plus, Humanities Abstracts, Humanities Full Text, Humanities Index, Humanities Index Retrospective, Wilson OmniFile: Full Text Mega Edition; Wilson OmniFile: Full Text Select; International Bibliography of Periodical Literature (IBZ); MLA International Bibliography; OCLC: ArticleFirst, Arts and Humanities Search, Periodical Abstracts; ProQuest: Humanities Module, ProQuest Central, ProQuest Research Library, ProQuest Research Library Core.
