= Harvard Classics =

50-volume anthology of classic works from world literature

The Harvard Classics
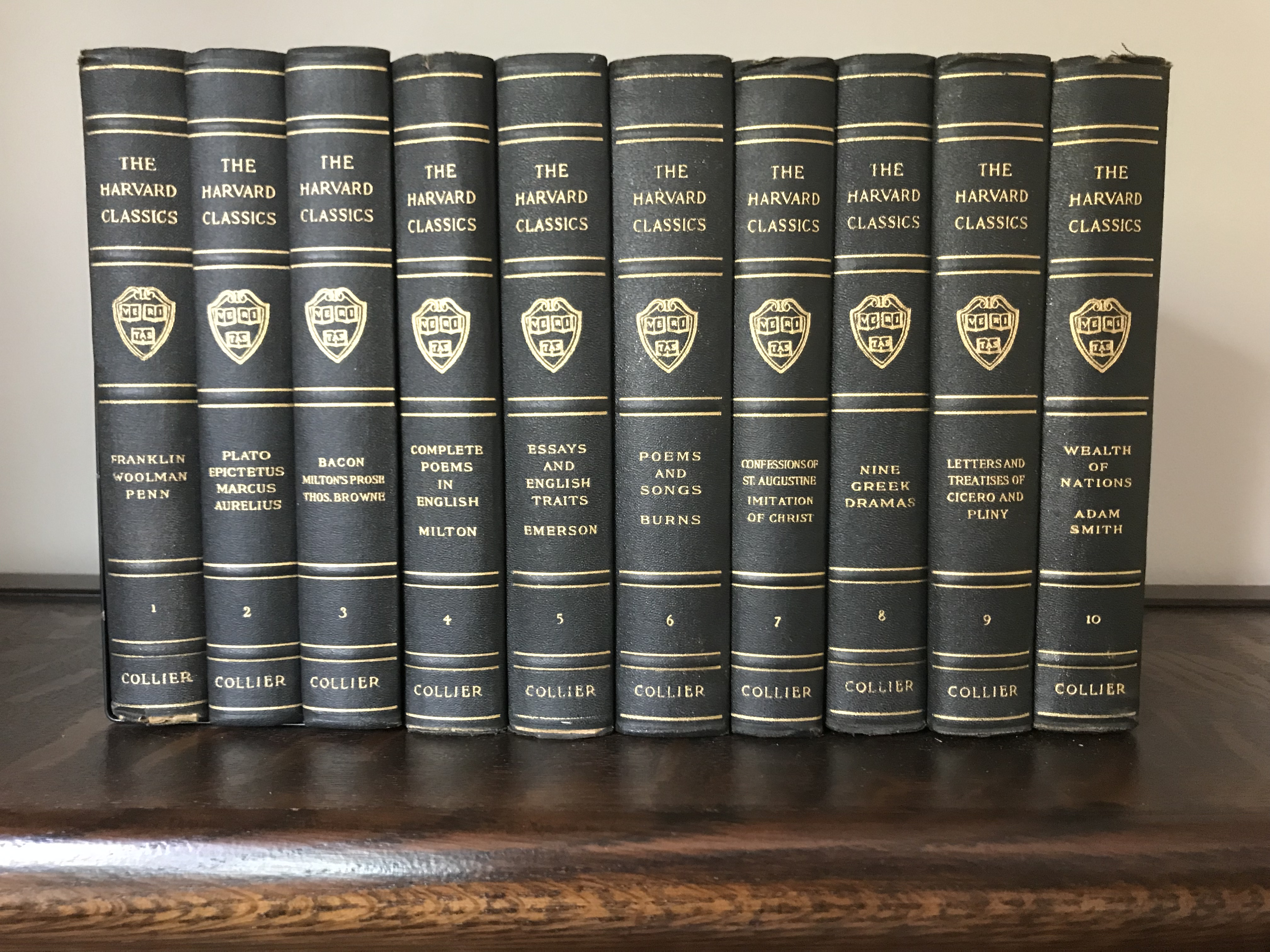
- Volumes 1-10 of The Harvard Classics (Southwark edition)
- Editor: Charles W. Eliot
- Original title: Dr. Eliot's Five Foot Shelf
- Publisher: P. F. Collier & Son
- Publication date: 1909 (First 25 volumes), 1910 (Next 25 volumes), 1914 (Lectures), 1916 (Reading Guide)

The Harvard Classics, originally marketed as Dr. Eliot's Five-Foot Shelf of Books, is a 50-volume series of classic works of world literature, important speeches, and historical documents compiled and edited by Harvard University President Charles W. Eliot. Eliot believed that a careful reading of the series and following the eleven reading plans included in Volume 50 would offer a reader, in the comfort of the home, the benefits of a liberal education, entertainment and counsel of history's greatest creative minds. The initial success of The Harvard Classics was due, in part, to the branding offered by Eliot and Harvard University. Buyers of these sets were apparently attracted to Eliot's claims. The General Index contains upwards of 76,000 subject references.

The first 25 volumes were published in 1909 followed by the next 25 volumes in 1910. The collection was enhanced when the Lectures on The Harvard Classics was added in 1914 and Fifteen Minutes a Day - The Reading Guide in 1916. The Lectures on The Harvard Classics was edited by Willam A. Neilson, who had assisted Eliot in the selection and design of the works in Volumes 1–49. Neilson also wrote the introductions and notes for the selections in Volumes 1–49. The Harvard Classics is often described as a "51 volume" set, however, P.F. Collier & Son consistently marketed the Harvard Classics as 50 volumes plus Lectures and a Daily Reading Guide. Both The Harvard Classics and The Five-Foot Shelf of Books are registered trademarks of P.F. Collier & Son for a series of books used since 1909.

Collier advertised The Harvard Classics in U.S. magazines including Collier's and McClure's, offering to send a pamphlet to prospective buyers. The pamphlet, entitled Fifteen Minutes a Day - A Reading Plan, is a 64-page booklet that describes the benefits of reading, gives the background on the book series, and includes many statements by Eliot about why he undertook the project. In the pamphlet, Eliot states:

My aim was not to select the best fifty, or best hundred, books in the world, but to give, in twenty-three thousand pages or thereabouts, a picture of the progress of the human race within historical times, so far as that progress can be depicted in books. The purpose of The Harvard Classics is, therefore, one different from that of collections in which the editor's aim has been to select a number of best books; it is nothing less than the purpose to present so ample and characteristic a record of the stream of the world's thought that the observant reader's mind shall be enriched, refined and fertilized. Within the limits of fifty volumes, containing about twenty-three thousand pages, my task was to provide the means of obtaining such knowledge of ancient and modern literature as seemed essential to the twentieth-century idea of a cultivated man. The best acquisition of a cultivated man is a liberal frame of mind or way of thinking; but there must be added to that possession acquaintance with the prodigious store of recorded discoveries, experiences, and reflections which humanity in its intermittent and irregular progress from barbarism to civilization has acquired and laid up.

Example advertisement for The Harvard Classics showing mail-in coupon, p.2, Collier's, November 19, 1910

== Dr. Eliot's Five-Foot Shelf of Books ==
The idea of the Harvard Classics was presented in speeches by then President Charles W. Eliot of Harvard University. Several years prior to 1909, Eliot gave a speech in which he remarked that a three-foot shelf would be sufficient to hold enough books to give a liberal education to anyone who would read them with devotion. He was inundated with requests for the list of those book titles that would fill the three-foot shelf. After many attempts to support his initial claim, he decided that the shelf would need to be lengthened to five feet - but a definitive list of works was not declared. A well-known publisher, Peter Fenelon Collier and his son, Robert J. Collier, saw a financial opportunity and asked that Eliot make good on his statement by selecting 50 volumes (400 to 500 pages each). Collier representatives proposed the name for the series as either "The Harvard Library" or "The Harvard Classics" pending approval by Harvard University. The proposal, presented to the President and Fellows of Harvard College, was unanimously approved as a useful undertaking from an educational point of view.

In February 1909 with his approaching retirement as President of Harvard University, Eliot accepted the proposal of P.F. Collier & Son. The agreement allowed Eliot to engage an assistant. He chose William A. Neilson, Professor of English at Harvard University. The English Bible was excluded because Eliot and Neilson felt that almost every household would already possess at least one copy. The contributions of living authors (other than scientific contributions) were excluded because Eliot and Neilson considered the "verdict of the educated world" was not yet final. Works of modern fiction were felt to be readily accessible and thus excluded. English and American literature as well as documents related to American social and political ideas were more likely to be selected because the Harvard Classics were intended primarily for American readers.

Eliot retired as President of Harvard University in May 1909 and devoted much of the next year to organizing the 50 volumes and selecting the list of included works. The first half of the included works was provided to P.F. Collier & Son in 1909. However, Eliot and Neilson did not make the remaining selections, write the introductions for each selection, and finish the general index until 1910. Consequently, P.F. Collier & Son printed volumes 1 to 25 in 1909 and volumes 26 to 50 in 1910. An advertisement for The Harvard Classics appeared in Collier's on April 30, 1909, stating the "Complete Official Contents Now Ready." With the help of more than 50 Harvard professors and instructors and the general library of Harvard University and its department libraries, Eliot and Neilson believed that the title "The Harvard Classics" was well deserved.

== Release and marketing ==
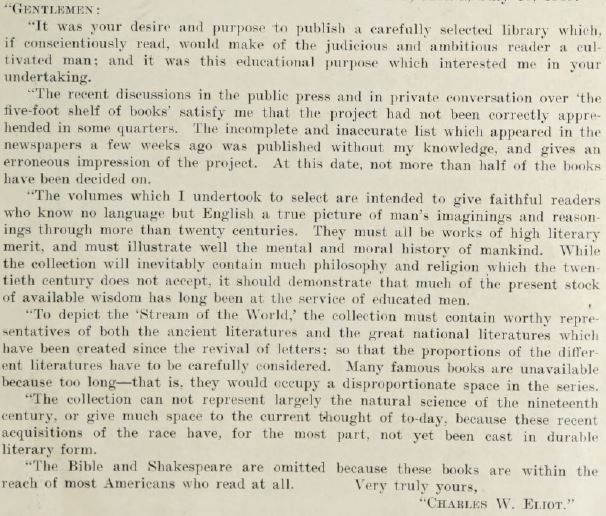
Eliot's letter describing the selection process in a letter to the editor, p.7, Collier's, July 24, 1909

In a June 1909 issue of Collier's Weekly, P.F. Collier & Son announced it would publish a series of books selected by Eliot, without disclosing the list of included works, that would be approximately five feet in length and would supply the readers a liberal education. A few days after the announced intent to publish Dr. Eliot's Five-Foot Shelf of Books, several newspapers published an incomplete list of selected works to be included. Eliot felt the publications were unauthorized and asked Collier's Weekly publishers to publish his letter to the editors explaining the initial list and selection process in the July 24, 1909, edition of Collier's. Eliot describes his goal in helping publish The Harvard Classics as motivated by an educational purpose and he explains why the English Bible was not selected. In January 1910, P.F. Collier & Son announced in a "Publishers' Statement" that the 50 volumes were almost complete and offered a "Statement from the Editor" (Eliot) describing the origins of process resulting in the first sets of The Harvard Classics. The first editions printed by P.F. Collier & Son in three separate styles of bindings were first offered for sale on October 13, 1909.

The collection was marketed so as to advertise in all the principal magazines published in the United States resulting in a combined circulation of almost 3,000,000 for the initial marketing effort. The sales were initiated using 3,000 agents who were supplied a prospectus or "Announcement of The Harvard Classics" so that leads could be followed up by the agents. Most advertisements encouraged an interest notice be mailed back to the publisher offering a targeted and highly successful marketing campaign for the series. The intent by the publisher was to offer The Harvard Classics as a subscription with only some of the volumes being sent initially and the remaining to follow in subsequent shipment. This was strategic since the complete 50 volumes had not yet been supplied by Eliot and Neilson to the publisher and would not be supplied until late in 1910.

== Printing history ==
Publishers' announcement of soon-to-be-completed 50 volumes of The Harvard Classics, Collier's Weekly, January 8, 1910

Volumes 1-49 of The Harvard Classics include reprints of hundreds of authors' works that may have been in the public domain (e.g., because of expired copyrights) or covered by existing copyright holders such as other publishing companies. In either case, Collier filed copyrights for the 49 volumes and for The Harvard Classics complete series in 1909 and 1910 and obtained, when necessary, permission to reprint selected works included in one of the 49 volumes. Collier's copyrighted Volume 50 was in 1910, the Lectures on The Harvard Classics in 1914, and Fifteen Minutes a Day - The Reading Guide in 1916.

P.F. Collier & Son asserts in many early advertisements of The Harvard Classics that 20,000 sets of The Harvard Classics were first printed to offer a "tremendous savings" to buyers and that these first printings include the word "Eliot" as a watermark on every page. To help the chronological obsession about the print runs of The Harvard Classics, clues regarding how many of first edition printings are offered in a trademark dispute case between P.F. Collier and E. Milton Jones in 1909 that was later ruled on in appeal in 1910 (in favor of P.F. Collier & Son). In testimony, Robert J. Collier states that the first sets of The Harvard Classics printed and sold were "bound in full morocco...one set, bound in three-quarters morocco...and the remaining set, bound in buckram...". Advertisements in 1910 also state Collier prepared editions for those who demand luxurious limited editions as well as for the readers who want less expensive sets.

The first editions of The Harvard Classics were known as "De Luxe" sets. Most were limited-quantity print runs and some "autographed" editions (only Volume 1 is autographed) include signatures by Eliot and in some cases Robert J. Collier. The first print runs in 1909 were for volumes 1 to 25. Another print run was needed in 1910 for volumes 26 to 50 because those volumes were not selected and edited by Eliot until the middle of 1910. The first editions include Japanese vellum paper with "Eliot" watermarks (made by S.D. Warren & Co. of Boston), deckled pages, silk moire endpapers, sewn in bookmarks, and top edged gilt pages. Each was appealing to buyers for the elaborate illustrations, frontispieces, plates, portraits, facsimiles, and crimson silk page markers (features unlikely to be found in later printings). The colophon found on the ultimate page of content of first editions notes these sets were "planned and designed by William Patten" (the Book Manager at P.F. Collier & Son).

The exact numbers of each of the three bindings making up the 20,000 first sets are unclear. Four different sets in full morocco leather were printed with raised bands, Harvard University insignia, and volume names in gilt lettering on the spines. The four variations in full leather include: (1) the "Alumni Autograph Edition" limited to 200 numbered sets (Volume 1 is autographed by Eliot), (2) the "Eliot Edition" limited to 1,000 numbered sets (Volume 1 is autographed by Eliot), (3) the "Alumni Edition De Luxe" (unsigned) limited to 1,000 numbered sets, and (4) the "Edition De Luxe" sets that are numbered and stated as being limited editions (but the number printed is not shown). The full morocco sets sold for at least $345. The Edition De Luxe sets in full morocco leather were sold many years (after the limited-quantity runs were sold out) as some include the "Lecture" volume added in 1914.

The second binding type of the first editions of The Harvard Classics were printed in three-quarters morocco leather binding over cloth boards. The first edition three-quarters morocco leather sets have similar variations as the full morocco leather sets including a (1) set limited to 1,000 numbered and autographed "Cambridge Editions" signed by Eliot and, interestingly, the publisher Robert J. Collier also signed the sets numbered from 412 to 973 over mottled cream boards, (2) set limited to 1,000 numbered and autographed "Eliot Edition" books over green cloth boards, and (3) a set limited to 1,000 (unsigned) called the "Alumni Edition" on the spine bound over crimson boards, and (4) a set of unknown number called the "Library Edition" (stated as limited edition, but number of printings is not shown) over crimson boards. The "Library Editions" do not paper with "Eliot" watermarks, but appear to have the same high-quality Japanese vellum paper. Each of these limited-quantity three-quarter morocco sets sold for $195.

Testimony from Robert J. Collier and John F. Oltroggege, NY Supreme Court, Oct 21, 1910 (Appellate Division-First Department), in Collier V Jones, ps. 39, 45, 60

The third type of binding of the first editions of The Harvard Classics were printed in fine buckram (green and crimson). The green buckram set of "Alumni Edition" printings is a numbered set limited to 1,000 numbered copies. The green buckram has gilt lettering with crimson and gold Harvard insignia on both the spine and front board. The first editions show "Alumni Edition De Luxe" are numbered and limited to 1,000 sets and include embossed bands on the spine. The remaining first edition set of The Harvard Classics, printed in fine crimson buckram cloth, is another version called the "Eliot Edition" - a limited quantity printing of 1,000. The crimson buckram "Eliot Edition" with Eliot's signature on the front board is printed with raised bands on the spine, "Eliot" watermarked pages, and include illustrations, frontispieces, plates, portraits, and facsimiles. This set does not include page markers. Both buckram first edition sets sold for $100. Another set almost identical to the limited-quantity green buckram sets, is also in green buckram and has "Alumni Edition" on the spine. This set was sold for many years and was limited to 10,000 printings. These second print runs of this set are almost identical to the first editions except the pastedown papers have much more faint printings, the limited edition page shows the editions as "Edition De Luxe," and watermarked "Eliot" pages are not included.

advertisement in 1910 of the Renaissance edition of The Harvard Classics, Collier's, December 3, 1910

In 1910, Collier began printing The Harvard Classics in a limited quantity set called the Renaissance edition. This beautifully bound set includes 10 different bindings consisting of reproductions of the artistic bindings of Royal Monarchs of Europe from the sixteenth to nineteenth centuries. Collier also began printing the National (1910) and Popular (1912) editions with lower price points in an effort, claimed by Collier in many advertisements, to honor the wishes of Eliot that The Harvard Classics are priced within everybody's reach. An extremely popular crimson-colored silk cloth set similar to the look of the De Luxe Morocco edition began printing in 1914 and was called the Cambridge edition. Variations of the Cambridge edition were printed for over a decade in cloth over hardboards and later (after 1919) in an imitation leather binding material called fabrikoid.

In 1919 Collier announced a new binding material for The Harvard Classic sets with the printing of a new set called the Southwark edition (in flexible dark green fabrikoid or imitation leather). The first set of the Southwark edition was printed in July 1919 and given to the Du Pont company. The set carries an inscription "This is the first set of Harvard Classics published by P.F. Collier & Son Company to be bound in DuPont Fabrikoid...". The set was named after the birthplace of one of the founders of Harvard College, John Harvard, who was born in London Borough of Southwark. The set is often referred to as the "Veritas" edition; however, the "Veritas" edition is bound in a dark crimson color promoted by DuPont. The new binding material, called fabrikoid, offered less weight, flexible boards, and bindings that were more durable than the cloth or leather bindings of the early editions. Fabrikoid bindings were used in editions published from the 1920s to 1950's such as the varicolored Gemston edition which has five different colors of bindings and for larger editions with increased font sizes called the (home) Library editions that were marketed as being easier to read.

Advertisement in 1918 of the (new) Cambridge edition of The Harvard Classics, Collier's, November 30, 1918 (printed in slight variations for many years in both hardboard and fabrikoid bindings)

The "Eliot Foundation of Adult Education" set, which appears to have been first printed around 1932 (based on included educational materials dated 1932 and later), is a rare numbered set bound in dark blue pebbled cloth. This set has gold gilt lettering with a profile of Eliot on the spine. The set was the focus of a set of materials for adult education with syllabi, instructions for study, and classroom discussions points. The set has an embossed symbol used in many of the education materials developed by the Eliot Foundation on the front board with Versitas Scientia Humanitas (trans. trust, knowledge, and culture). The number of printings of this rare set is unknown. Later editions (with names such as Gemstone, Deluxe Registered, Veritas, Home Library, and Great Literature editions) were not quite as unique as price points were further lowered to make the Harvard Classics more affordable. These later editions were printed in various sizes and binding materials such as cloth, fabrikoid, bonded leather, and even later in various types of imitation and genuine leather often printed to imitate earlier editions.

P.F. Collier & Son printed the 50th edition (that is, different set) of The Harvard Classics in 1956. Owners and prospective buyers of The Harvard Classics editions are often interested in the printing year of a particular edition. As mentioned before, not even the first editions were fully printed in 1909. First editions were printed in 1909 and 1910, and all subsequent editions were printed in 1910 or later. A printer's key could be used to describe the print run, but these were not used in the U.S. until the middle of the twentieth century. Copyright dates for book reprints are unlikely to identify the year of printing excepts for first four editions. For The Harvard Classics series, copyright pages of The Harvard Classics have no information about the printing year (or run) until 1956 when the publisher began including information about the year of the print run.

Collier's renewed the copyrights for The Harvard Classics 28 years after filing the first copyrights for The Harvard Classics (as was customary at the time, as it offered some legal advantages) in 1936 and 1937. Coliier's again renewed the copyrights in 1956 and 1959, and several times in the sixties as editions were printed in different page sizes and fonts (resulting is different pagination than described in initial copyright filings) and because some editions were printed and sold with fewer than 50 volumes. In sum, copyright dates of The Harvard Classics editions offer misleading information about the printing date or printing year after the first editions were printed in 1909 and 1910. For example, print runs following the publications of the first editions and until 1937 include copyrights dates of 1909 or 1910 although the printing year could be over 20 years later (or more).

Some clues about the printing history can help identify the print run year. For example, the inclusion of the "Lectures" began in 1914. Additionally, the "Editor's Introduction" in volume 50 includes a second "Editor's Introduction" that is dated in 1917. Fabrikoid was first used as binding for The Harvard Classics in 1919. Lastly, the publishing company marketed a larger size of books with the Home Library edition. This set of The Harvard Classics and subsequent editions are 15 percent larger than previous editions. None of these clues allow for an exact printing year, but each can be used to establish that the printing could not have occurred before a certain year, and of course, the printing cannot have occurred before the most recent copyright date.

The last edition of The Harvard Classics printed by P.F. Collier & Son (then a subsidiary of Crowell Collier & Macmillan, Inc.) was the 63rd printing in 1970 of a 22-volume called the "Great Literature Edition" in green fibrates (essentially bonded) leather with 22K decor that sold for $3.78 per volume ($1 each for the first three volumes). The Federal Trade Commission filed a complaint in 1972 against Crowell Collier for deceptive selling practices of The Harvard Classics. In a statement responding to the complaint, Crowell Collier stated that it no longer sells The Harvard Classics. On March 24, 1973, the FTC provisionally accepted a consent order from Crowell Collier (now called Crowell, Collier and MacMillan, Inc.) that the publisher would stop trying to sell The Harvard Classics in one bulk shipment. The publisher ended the subscription plan used since 1909 and stated that it had no plans to sell The Harvard Classics one book at a time.

== Enduring success ==
As Adam Kirsch, writing for Harvard magazine in 2001, notes, "It is surprisingly easy, even today, to find a complete set of the Harvard Classics in good condition. At least one is usually for sale on eBay, the Internet auction site, for $300 or so, a bargain at $6 a book. The supply, from attics or private libraries around the country, seems endless — a tribute to the success of the publisher, P.F. Collier, who sold some 350,000 sets within 20 years of the series' initial publication".

The Five-Foot Shelf, with its introductions, notes, guides to reading, and exhaustive indexes, may claim to constitute a reading course unparalleled in comprehensiveness and authority.

— Notes on the Lectures by William Allan Neilson

The main function of the collection should be to develop and foster in many thousands of people a taste for serious reading of the highest quality, outside of The Harvard Classics as well as within them.

— Charles W. Eliot

Eliot and Neilson concluded that the 50 volumes were "so far as possible, entire works or complete segments of the world's written legacies" for English speaking readers.

== Similar compendia ==
- The concept of education through systematic reading of seminal works themselves (rather than textbooks) was carried on by John Erskine at Columbia University, and in the 1930s Mortimer Adler and Robert Hutchins at the University of Chicago carried this idea further with the concepts of education through study of the "great books" and "great ideas" of Western civilization. This led to the publication in 1952 of Great Books of the Western World, which is still in print and actively marketed. In 1937, under Stringfellow Barr, St. John's College introduced a curriculum based on the direct study of "great books". These sets are popular today with those interested in homeschooling.
- Gateway to the Great Books was designed as an introduction to the Great Books of the Western World, published by the same organization and editors in 1952.
- Palgrave's The Golden Treasury is a popular anthology of English poetry, originally selected for publication by Francis Turner Palgrave in 1861.
- The Oxford Book of English Verse is an anthology of English poetry that had a very substantial influence on popular taste and perception of poetry for at least a generation.
- The Loeb Classical Library is a series of books, today published by Harvard University Press, which presents important works of ancient Greek and Latin literature in a way designed to make the text accessible to the broadest possible audience.
- Sacred Books of the East is a 50-volume set of English translations of Asian religious writings published by the Oxford University Press between 1879 and 1910. It incorporates the essential sacred texts of Hinduism, Buddhism, Taoism, Confucianism, Zoroastrianism, Jainism, and Islam.
- The Delphian Society created the 10 Volume Delphian Course of Reading—with the Harvard Classics editor Eliot in mind—for young and developing minds.
- The Everyman's Library is a series of reprints of classic literature, primarily from the Western canon.
- The Thinker's Library is a selection of essays, literature, and extracts from greater works by various classical and contemporary humanists and rationalists, continuing in the tradition of the Renaissance that were published between 1929 and 1951 for the Rationalist Press Association by Watts & Co., London, a company founded by Charles Albert Watts.

== Contents ==
=== Vol. 1–10 ===
Volumes 1-10

==== Vol. 1: Benjamin Franklin, John Woolman, William Penn ====
"The Harvard classics Volume 1". Internet Archive.

- The Autobiography of Benjamin Franklin, by Benjamin Franklin
- The Journal of John Woolman, by John Woolman (1774 and subsequent editions)
- Fruits of Solitude, by William Penn

==== Vol. 2. Plato, Epictetus, Marcus Aurelius ====
"The Harvard classics Volume 2". Internet Archive.

- The Apology, Crito, and Phaedo, by Plato
- The Golden Sayings, by Epictetus
- The Meditations, by Marcus Aurelius

==== Vol. 3. Bacon, Milton's Prose, Thomas Browne ====
"The Harvard classics Volume 3". Internet Archive. 19 January 2006.

- Essays, Civil and Moral, and New Atlantis, by Francis Bacon
- Areopagitica and Tractate of Education, by John Milton
- Religio Medici, by Sir Thomas Browne

==== Vol. 4. Complete Poems in English, Milton ====
"The Harvard classics Volume 4". Internet Archive. 20 January 2006.

- Complete poems written in English, by John Milton

==== Vol. 5. Essays and English Traits, Emerson ====
"The Harvard classics Volume 5". Internet Archive. 20 January 2006.

- Essays and English Traits, by Ralph Waldo Emerson

==== Vol. 6. Poems and Songs, Burns ====
"The Harvard classics Volume 6". Internet Archive. 20 January 2006.

- Poems and songs, by Robert Burns

==== Vol. 7. The Confessions of St. Augustine, The Imitation of Christ ====
"The Harvard classics Volume 7". Internet Archive. October 1909.

- The Confessions, by Saint Augustine
- The Imitation of Christ, by Thomas à Kempis

==== Vol. 8. Nine Greek Dramas ====
"The Harvard classics Volume 8". Internet Archive. 21 January 2006.

- Agamemnon, The Libation Bearers, The Furies, and Prometheus Bound, by Aeschylus
- Oedipus the King and Antigone, by Sophocles
- Hippolytus and The Bacchae, by Euripides
- The Frogs, by Aristophanes

==== Vol. 9. Letters and Treatises of Cicero and Pliny ====
"The Harvard classics Volume 9". Internet Archive. 4 January 2006.

- On Friendship, On Old Age, and Letters, by Cicero
- Letters, by Pliny the Younger

==== Vol. 10. Wealth of Nations, Adam Smith ====
"The Harvard classics Volume 10". Internet Archive. 4 January 2006.

- The Wealth of Nations, by Adam Smith

=== Vol. 11–20 ===
Volumes 11-20

==== Vol. 11. Origin of Species, Darwin ====
"The Harvard classics Volume 11". Internet Archive. 4 January 2006.

- The Origin of Species, by Charles Darwin

==== Vol. 12. Plutarch's Lives ====
"The Harvard classics Volume 12". Internet Archive. 4 January 2006.

- Lives, by Plutarch

==== Vol. 13. Aeneid, Virgil ====
"The Harvard classics Volume 13". Internet Archive. 6 January 2006.

- Aeneid, by Virgil

==== Vol. 14. Don Quixote, Part 1, Cervantes ====
"The Harvard classics Volume 14". Internet Archive. 5 January 2006.

- Don Quixote, part 1, by Miguel de Cervantes

==== Vol. 15. Bunyan & Walton ====
"The Harvard classics Volume 15". Internet Archive. 5 January 2006.

- The Pilgrim's Progress, by John Bunyan
- The Lives of Donne and Herbert, by Izaak Walton

==== Vol. 16. The Thousand and One Nights ====
"The Harvard classics Volume 16". Internet Archive. 21 January 2006.

- Stories from the Thousand and One Nights, translated by Edward William Lane, revised by Stanley Lane-Poole

==== Vol. 17. Folk-Lore and Fable, Aesop, Grimm, Andersen ====
"The Harvard classics Volume 17". Internet Archive. 5 January 2006.

- Fables, by Aesop
- Children's and Household Tales, by Jacob and Wilhelm Grimm
- Tales, by Hans Christian Andersen

==== Vol. 18. Modern English Drama ====
"The Harvard classics Volume 18". Internet Archive. 5 January 2006.

- All for Love, by John Dryden
- The School for Scandal, by Richard Brinsley Sheridan
- She Stoops to Conquer, by Oliver Goldsmith
- The Cenci, by Percy Bysshe Shelley
- A Blot in the 'Scutcheon, by Robert Browning
- Manfred, by Lord Byron

==== Vol. 19. Faust, Egmont, etc., Goethe, Doctor Faustus, Marlowe ====
"The Harvard classics Volume 19". Internet Archive. 6 January 2006.

- Faust, part 1, Egmont, and Hermann and Dorothea, by Johann Wolfgang von Goethe
- Dr. Faustus, by Christopher Marlowe

==== Vol. 20. The Divine Comedy, Dante ====
"The Harvard classics Volume 20". Internet Archive. 6 January 2006.

- The Divine Comedy, by Dante Alighieri

=== Vol. 21–30 ===
Volumes 21-30

==== Vol. 21. I Promessi Sposi, Manzoni ====
"The Harvard classics Volume 21". Internet Archive. 13 October 2009.

- I promessi sposi (The Betrothed), by Alessandro Manzoni

==== Vol. 22. The Odyssey, Homer ====
"The Harvard classics Volume 22". Internet Archive. 13 October 2009.

- The Odyssey, by Homer

==== Vol. 23. Two Years Before the Mast, Dana ====
"The Harvard classics Volume 23". Internet Archive. 6 January 2006.

- Two Years Before the Mast, by Richard Henry Dana Jr.

==== Vol. 24. On the Sublime, French Revolution, etc., Burke ====
"The Harvard classics Volume 24". Internet Archive. 6 January 2006.

- On Taste, On the Sublime and Beautiful, Reflections on the French Revolution, and A Letter to a Noble Lord, by Edmund Burke

==== Vol. 25. J.S. Mill and Thomas Carlyle ====
"The Harvard classics Volume 25". Internet Archive. 6 January 2006.

- Autobiography and On Liberty, by John Stuart Mill
- Characteristics, Inaugural Address at Edinburgh, and Sir Walter Scott, by Thomas Carlyle

==== Vol. 26. Continental Drama ====
"The Harvard classics Volume 26". Internet Archive. 9 January 2006.

- Life is a Dream, by Pedro Calderón de la Barca
- Polyeucte, by Pierre Corneille
- Phèdre, by Jean Racine
- Tartuffe, by Molière
- Minna von Barnhelm, by Gotthold Ephraim Lessing
- William Tell, by Friedrich von Schiller

==== Vol. 27. English Essays, Sidney to Macaulay ====
"The Harvard classics Volume 27". Internet Archive. 9 January 2006.

- The Defense of Poesy by Sir Philip Sidney
- On Shakespeare by Ben Jonson
- On Bacon by Ben Jonson
- Of Agriculture by Abraham Cowley
- The Vision of Mirza by Joseph Addison
- Westminster Abbey by Joseph Addison
- The Spectator Club by Sir Richard Steele
- Hints Towards an Essay on Conversation by Jonathan Swift
- A Treatise on Good Manners and Good Breeding by Jonathan Swift
- A Letter of Advice to a Young Poet by Jonathan Swift
- On the Death of Esther Johnson [Stella] by Jonathan Swift
- The Shortest-Way with the Dissenters by Daniel Defoe
- The Education of Women by Daniel Defoe
- Life of Addison, 1672-1719 by Samuel Johnson
- Of the Standard of Taste by David Hume
- Fallacies of Anti-Reformers by Sydney Smith
- On Poesy or Art by Samuel Taylor Coleridge
- Of Persons One Would Wish to Have Seen by William Hazlitt
- Deaths of Little Children by Leigh Hunt
- On the Realities of Imagination by Leigh Hunt
- On the Tragedies of Shakspere by Charles Lamb
- Levana and Our Ladies of Sorrow by Thomas De Quincey
- A Defence of Poetry by Percy Bysshe Shelley
- Machiavelli by Thomas Babington Macaulay

==== Vol. 28. Essays, English and American ====
"The Harvard classics Volume 28". Internet Archive. 9 January 2006.

- William Makepeace Thackery

- Jonathan Swift

- John Henry Newman

- The Idea of a University

- Matthew Arnold

- The Study of Poetry

- John Ruskin

- Sesame and Lilies

- Walter Bagehot

- John Milton

- Thomas Henry Huxley

- Science and Culture

- Edward Augustus Freeman

- Race and Language

- Robert Louis Stevenson

- Truth Of Intercourse

- Samuel Pepys

- William Ellery Channing

- On the Elevation of the Laboring Classes

- Edgar Allan Poe

- The Poetic Principle

- Henry David Thoreau

- Walking

- James Russell Lowell

- Abraham Lincoln

- Democracy

==== Vol. 29. Voyage of the Beagle, Darwin ====
"The Harvard classics Volume 29". Internet Archive. 9 January 2006.

- The Voyage of the Beagle, by Charles Darwin

==== Vol. 30. Faraday, Helmholtz, Kelvin, Newcomb, etc. ====
"The Harvard classics Volume 30". Internet Archive. 9 January 2006.

- The Forces of Matter and The Chemical History of a Candle, by Michael Faraday
- On the Conservation of Force and Ice and Glaciers, by Hermann von Helmholtz
- The Wave Theory of Light and The Tides, by Lord Kelvin
- The Extent of the Universe, by Simon Newcomb
- Geographical Evolution, by Sir Archibald Geikie

=== Vol. 31–40 ===
Volumes 31-40

==== Vol. 31. Autobiography, Cellini ====
"The Harvard Classics Volume 31". Internet Archive. 10 January 2006.

- The Autobiography of Benvenuto Cellini

==== Vol. 32. Montaigne, Sainte-Beuve, Renan, etc. ====
"The Harvard Classics Volume 32". Internet Archive. 10 January 2006.

- Essays, by Michel Eyquem de Montaigne
- Montaigne and What is a Classic?, by Charles Augustin Sainte-Beuve
- The Poetry of the Celtic Races, by Ernest Renan
- The Education of the Human Race, by Gotthold Ephraim Lessing
- Letters upon the Aesthetic Education of Man, by Friedrich von Schiller
- Fundamental Principles of the Metaphysic of Morals, by Immanuel Kant
- Byron and Goethe, by Giuseppe Mazzini

==== Vol. 33. Voyages and Travels ====
"The Harvard Classics Volume 33". Internet Archive. 7 September 2011.

- An account of Egypt from The Histories, by Herodotus
- Germany, by Tacitus
- Sir Francis Drake Revived, by Philip Nichols
- Sir Francis Drake's Famous Voyage Round the World, by Francis Pretty
- Drake's Great Armada, by Captain Walter Bigges
- Sir Humphrey Gilbert's Voyage to Newfoundland, by Edward Haies
- The Discovery of Guiana, by Sir Walter Raleigh

==== Vol. 34. Descartes, Voltaire, Rousseau, Hobbes ====
"The Harvard Classics Volume 34". Internet Archive. 10 January 2006.

- Discourse on Method, by René Descartes
- Letters on the English, by Voltaire
- On the Inequality among Mankind and Profession of Faith of a Savoyard Vicar, by Jean Jacques Rousseau
- Of Man, Being the First Part of Leviathan, by Thomas Hobbes

==== Vol. 35. Froissart, Malory, Holinshead ====
"The Harvard Classics Volume 35". Internet Archive. 10 January 2006.

- Chronicles, by Jean Froissart
- The Holy Grail, by Sir Thomas Malory
- A Description of Elizabethan England, by William Harrison

==== Vol. 36. Machiavelli, More, Luther ====
"The Harvard Classics Volume 36". Internet Archive. 10 January 2006.

- The Prince, by Niccolò Machiavelli
- The Life of Sir Thomas More, by William Roper
- Utopia, by Sir Thomas More
- The Ninety-Five Theses, To the Christian Nobility of the German Nation, and On the Freedom of a Christian, by Martin Luther

==== Vol. 37. Locke, Berkeley, Hume ====
"The Harvard Classics Volume 37". Internet Archive. 10 January 2006.

- Some Thoughts Concerning Education, by John Locke
- Three Dialogues Between Hylas and Philonous in Opposition to Sceptics and Atheists, by George Berkeley
- An Enquiry Concerning Human Understanding, by David Hume

==== Vol. 38. Harvey, Jenner, Lister, Pasteur ====
"The Harvard Classics Volume 38". Internet Archive. 23 January 2006.

- The Oath of Hippocrates
- Journeys in Diverse Places, by Ambroise Paré
- On the Motion of the Heart and Blood in Animals, by William Harvey
- The Three Original Publications on Vaccination Against Smallpox, by Edward Jenner
- The Contagiousness of Puerperal Fever, by Oliver Wendell Holmes
- On the Antiseptic Principle of the Practice of Surgery, by Joseph Lister
- Scientific papers, by Louis Pasteur
- Scientific papers, by Charles Lyell

==== Vol. 39. Famous Prefaces ====
"The Harvard Classics Volume 39". Internet Archive. 23 January 2006.

- "Title, Prologue and Epilogues to the Recuyell of the Histories of Troy", by William Caxton
- "Epilogue to Dictes and Sayings of the Philosophers", by William Caxton
- "Prologue to Golden Legend", by William Caxton
- "Prologue to Caton", by William Caxton
- "Epilogue to Aesop", by William Caxton
- "Proem to Chaucer's Canterbury Tales", by William Caxton
- "Prologue to Malory's King Arthur", by William Caxton
- "Prologue to Virgil's Eneydos", by William Caxton
- "Dedication of the Institutes of the Christian Religion" by John Calvin
- "Dedication of the Revolutions of the Heavenly Bodies" by Nicolaus Copernicus
- "Preface to the History of the Reformation in Scotland", by John Knox
- "Prefatory Letter to Sir Walter Raleigh on The Faerie Queene", by Edmund Spenser
- "Preface to the History of the World" by Sir Walter Raleigh
- "Prooemium, Epistle Dedicatory, Preface, and Plan of the Instauratio Magna, etc.", by Francis Bacon
- "Preface to the Novum Organum", by Francis Bacon
- "Preface to the First Folio Edition of Shakespeare's Plays" by Heminge and Condell
- "Preface to the Philosophiae Naturalis Pricipia Mathematica", by Sir Isaac Newton
- "Preface to Fables, Ancient and Modern", by John Dryden
- "Preface to Joseph Andrews", by Henry Fielding
- "Preface to the English Dictionary", by Samuel Johnson
- "Preface to Shakespeare", by Samuel Johnson
- "Introduction to the Propylaen", by J.W. von Goethe
- "Prefaces to Various Volumes of Poems", by William Wordsworth
- "Appendix to Lyrical Ballads", by William Wordsworth
- "Essay Supplementary to Preface", by William Wordsworth
- "Preface to Cromwell", by Victor Hugo
- "Preface to Leaves of Grass", by Walt Whitman
- "Introduction to the History of English Literature", by H.A. Taine

==== Vol. 40. English Poetry 1: Chaucer to Gray ====
"The Harvard Classics Volume 40". Internet Archive. 11 January 2006.

- Geoffrey Chaucer
  - "The Prologue to the Canterbury Tales"
  - The Nun's Priest's Tale
- Traditional Ballads
  - "The Douglas Tragedy"
  - "The Twa Sisters"
  - "Edward"
  - "Babylon; or, The Bonnie Banks o Fordie"
  - "Hind Horn"
  - "Lord Thomas and Fair Annet"
  - "Love Gregor"
  - "Bonny Barbara Allan"
  - "The Gay Goss-Hawk"
  - "The Three Ravens"
  - "The Twa Corbies"
  - "Sir Patrick Spence"
  - "Thomas Rymer and the Queen of Elfland"
  - "Sweet William's Ghost"
  - "The Wife of Usher's Well"
  - "Hugh of Lincoln"
  - "Young Bicham"
  - "Get Up and Bar the Door"
  - "The Battle of Otterburn"
  - "Chevy Chase"
  - "Johnie Armstrong"
  - "Captain Car"
  - "The Bonny Earl of Murray"
  - "Kinmont Willie"
  - "Bonnie George Campbell"
  - "The Dowy Houms o Yarrow"
  - "Mary Hamilton"
  - "The Baron of Brackley"
  - "Bewick and Grahame"
  - "A Gest of Robyn Hode"
- Anonymous
  - "Balow"
  - "The Old Cloak"
  - "Jolly Good Ale and Old"
- Sir Thomas Wyatt
  - "A Supplication"
  - "The Lover's Appeal"
- Henry Howard, Earl of Surrey
  - "Complaint of the Absence of Her Lover"
  - "The Means to Attain Happy Life"
- George Gascoigne
  - "A Lover's Lullaby"
- Nicholas Breton
  - "Phillida and Coridon"
- Anonymous
  - "A Sweet Lullaby"
  - "Preparations"
  - "The Unfaithful Shepherdess"
- Anthony Munday
  - "Beauty Bathing
- Richard Edwardes
  - "Amantium Irae"
- Sir Walter Raleigh
  - "His Pilgrimage"
  - "The Lie"
  - "Verses"
  - "What Is Our Life"
- Sir Edward Dyer
  - "My Mind to Me a Kingdom Is"
- John Lyly
  - "Cupid and Campaspe"
  - "Spring's Welcome"
- Sir Philip Sidney
  - "Song"
  - "A Dirge"
  - "A Ditty"
  - "Loving in Truth"
  - "Be Your Words Made, Good Sir, of Indian Ware"
  - "To Sleep"
  - "To the Moon"
- Thomas Lodge
  - "Rosalind's Madrigal"
  - "Rosaline"
  - "Phillis"
- George Peele
  - "Paris and None"
- Robert Southwell
  - "The Burning Babe"
- Samuel Daniel
  - "Beauty, Time, and Love Sonnets"
  - "To Sleep"
- Michael Drayton
  - "Agincourt"
  - "To the Virginian Voyage"
  - "Love's Farewell"
- Henry Constable
  - "Diaphenia"
- Edmund Spenser
  - Prothalamion
  - Epithalamion
  - "A Ditty"
  - "Perigot and Willie's Roundelay"
  - "Easter"
  - "What Guile Is This?"
  - "Fair Is My Love"
  - "So Oft as I Her Beauty do Behold"
  - "Rudely Thou Wrongest My Dear Heart's Desire"
  - "Like as the Culver, on the Bared Bough"
- William Habington
  - "To Roses in the Bosom of Castara"
  - "Nox Nocti Indicat Scientiam"
- Christopher Marlowe
  - "The Passionate Shepherd to His Love"
  - "Her Reply" (Written by Sir Walter Raleigh)
- Richard Rowlands
  - "Our Blessed Lady's Lullaby"
- Thomas Nashe
  - "In Time of Pestilence"
  - "Spring"
- William Shakespeare
  - "Winter"
  - "O Mistress Mine"
  - "Fancy"
  - "Under the Greenwood Tree"
  - "A Lover and His Lass"
  - "Silvia"
  - "Spring"
  - "Lullaby"
  - "Ophelia's Song"
  - "Where the Bee Sucks"
  - "Take, O Take"
  - "A Madrigal"
  - "Amiens' Song"
  - "Dawn Song"
  - "Dirge of Love"
  - "Fidele's Dirge"
  - Sonnets 18, 29, 30, 31, 32, 33, 54, 55, 57, 60, 64, 65, 66, 71, 73, 87, 90, 94, 97, 98, 104, 106, 107, 109, 110, 111, 116, 129, 146, 148.
- Robert Greene
  - "Content"
- Richard Barnfield
  - "The Nightingale"
- Thomas Campion
  - "Cherry-ripe"
  - "Follow your Saint"
  - "When to Her Lute Corinna Sings"
  - "Follow Thy Fair Sun"
  - "Turn All Thy Thoughts to Eyes"
  - "Integer Vitae"
- Robert Devereux, Earl of Essex
  - "A Passion of My Lord of Essex"
- Sir Henry Wotton
  - "Elizabeth of Bohemia"
  - "Character of a Happy Life"
- Edward de Vere, Earl of Oxford
  - "A Renunciation"
- Ben Jonson
  - "Simplex Munditiis"
  - "The Triumph"
  - "The Noble Nature"
  - "To Celia"
  - "A Farewell to the World"
  - "A Nymph's Passion"
  - "Epode"
  - "Epitaph on Elizabeth L. H."
  - "On Lucy, Countess of Bedford"
  - "An Ode to Himself"
  - "Hymn to Diana"
  - "On Salathiel Pavy"
  - "His Supposed Mistress"
  - "To the Memory of My Beloved the Author, Mr. William Shakespeare and What He Hath Left Us"
- John Donne
  - "The Funeral"
  - "A Hymn to God the Father"
  - "Valediction, Forbidding Mourning"
  - "Death"
  - "The Dream"
  - "Song"
  - "Sweetest Love, I do not Go"
  - "Lover's Infiniteness"
  - "Love's Deity"
  - "Stay, O Sweet"
  - "The Blossom"
  - "The Good Morrow"
  - "Present in Absence" (incorrectly attributed to John Donne; actually written by his contemporary John Hoskins)
- Joshua Sylvester
  - "Love's Omnipresence"
- William Alexander, Earl of Stirling
  - "To Aurora"
- Richard Corbet
  - "Farewell, Rewards and Fairies"
- Thomas Heywood
  - "Pack, Clouds, Away"
- Thomas Dekker
  - "Country Glee"
  - "Cold's the Wind"
  - "O Sweet Content"
- Francis Beaumont
  - "On the Tombs in Westminster Abbey"
  - "Master Francis Beaumont's Letter to Ben Jonson"
- John Fletcher
  - "Aspatia's Song"
  - "Melancholy"
- John Webster
  - "Call for the Robin-Redbreast"
- Anonymous
  - "O Waly, Waly"
  - "Helen of Kirconnell"
  - "My Love in Her Attire"
  - "Love Not Me"
- William Drummond
  - "Saint John Baptist"
  - "Madrigal"
  - "Life"
  - "Human Folly"
  - "The Problem"
  - "To His Lute"
  - "For the Magdalene"
  - "Content and Resolute"
  - "Alexis, Here She Stayed; Among These Pines"
  - "Summons to Love"
- George Wither
  - "I Loved a Lass"
  - "The Lover's Resolution"
- William Browne (?)
  - "On the Countess Dowager of Pembroke"
- Robert Herrick
  - "Cherry-Ripe"
  - "A Child's Grace"
  - "The Mad Maid's Song"
  - "To the Virgins"
  - "To Dianeme"
  - "A Sweet Disorder"
  - "Whenas in Silks"
  - "To Anthea Who May Command Him Any Thing"
  - "To Daffodils"
  - "To Blossoms"
  - "Corinna's Maying"
- Francis Quarles
  - "An Ecstasy"
- George Herbert
  - "Love"
  - "Virtue"
  - "The Elixir"
  - "The Collar"
  - "The Flower"
  - "Easter Song"
  - "The Pulley"
- Henry Vaughan
  - "Beyond the Veil"
  - "The Retreat"
- Francis Bacon, Viscount St. Alban
  - "Life"
- James Shirley
  - "The Glories of Our Blood and State"
  - "The Last Conqueror"
- Thomas Carew
  - "The True Beauty"
  - "Ask Me No More"
  - "Know, Celia"
  - "Give Me More Love"
- Sir John Suckling
  - "The Constant Lover"
  - "Why So Pale and Wan"
- Sir William D'Avenant
  - "Dawn Song"
- Richard Lovelace
  - "To Lucasta, on Going to the Wars"
  - "To Althea from Prison"
  - "To Lucasta, Going Beyond the Seas"
- Edmund Waller
  - "On a Girdle"
  - "Go, Lovely Rose!"
- William Cartwright
  - "On the Queen's Return from the Low Countries"
- James Graham, Marquis of Montrose
  - "My Dear and Only Love"
- Richard Crashaw
  - "Wishes for the Supposed Mistress"
  - "Upon the Book and Picture of the Seraphical Saint Teresa"
- Thomas Jordan
  - "Let Us Drink and Be Merry"
- Abraham Cowley
  - "A Supplication"
  - "Cheer Up, My Mates"
  - "Drinking"
  - "On the Death of Mr. William Hervey"
- Alexander Brome
  - "The Resolve"
- Andrew Marvell
  - "A Garden"
  - "The Picture of Little T. C. in a Prospect of Flowers"
  - "Horatian Ode upon Cromwell's Return from Ireland"
  - "Song of the Emigrants in Bermuda"
  - "Thoughts in a Garden"
- Anonymous
  - "Love Will Find Out the Way"
  - "Phillada Flouts Me"
- Earl of Rochester
  - "Epitaph on Charles II"
- Sir Charles Sedley
  - "Chloris"
  - "Celia"
- John Dryden
  - "Ode"
  - "Song to a Fair Young Lady, Going Out of the Town in the Spring"
  - "Song for St. Cecilia's Day"
  - "Alexander's Feast"
  - "On Milton"
- Matthew Prior
  - "To a Child of Quality"
  - "Cloe"
  - "The Dying Adrian to His Soul"
  - "Epigram"
- Isaac Watts
  - "True Greatness"
- Lady Grisel Baillie
  - "Werena My Heart Licht I Wad Dee"
- Joseph Addison
  - "Hymn"
- Allan Ramsay
  - "Peggy"
- John Gay
  - "Love in Her Eyes Sits Playing"
  - "Black-Eyed Susan"
- Henry Carey
  - "Sally in Our Alley"
- Alexander Pope
  - "Solitude"
  - "On a Certain Lady at Court"
  - An Essay on Man
- Ambrose Philips
  - "To Charlotte Pulteney"
- Colley Cibber
  - "The Blind Boy"
- James Thomson
  - "Rule, Britannia"
  - "To Fortune"
- Thomas Gray
  - Elegy
  - "Ode on a Distant Prospect of Eton College"
  - "Hymn to Adversity"
  - "Ode on the Spring"
  - "The Progress of Poesy"
  - "The Bard"
  - "Ode on the Pleasure Arising from Vicissitude"
  - "On a Favourite Cat, Drowned in a Tub of Gold Fishes"
- George Bubb Dodington, Lord Melcombe
  - "Shorten Sail"

=== Vol. 41–50 ===
Volumes 41-50

==== Vol. 41. English Poetry 2: Collins to Fitzgerald ====
"The Harvard Classics Volume 41". Internet Archive. 23 January 2006.

- William Collins
  - "Fidele"
  - "Ode Written in MDCCXLVI"
  - "The Passions"
  - "To Evening"
- George Sewell
  - "The Dying Man in His Garden"
- Alison Rutherford Cockburn
  - "The Flowers of the Forest"
- Jane Elliot
  - "Lament for Flodden"
- Christopher Smart
  - "A Song to David"
- Anonymous
  - "Willy Drowned in Yarrow"
- John Logan
  - "The Braes of Yarrow"
- Henry Fielding
  - "A Hunting Song"
- Charles Dibdin
  - "Tom Bowling"
- Samuel Johnson
  - "On the Death of Dr. Robert Levet"
  - "A Satire"
- Oliver Goldsmith
  - "When Lovely Woman Stoops"
  - "Retaliation"
  - "The Deserted Village"
  - "The Traveller; or, A Prospect of Society"
- Robert Graham of Gartmore
  - "If Doughty Deeds"
- Adam Austin
  - "For Lack of Gold"
- William Cowper
  - "Loss of the Royal George"
  - "To a Young Lady"
  - "The Poplar Field"
  - "The Solitude of Alexander Selkirk"
  - "To Mary Unwin"
  - "To the Same"
  - "Boadicea: An Ode"
  - "The Castaway"
  - "The Shrubbery"
  - "On the Receipt of My Mother's Picture Out of Norfolk"
  - "The Diverting History of John Gilpin"
- Richard Brinsley Sheridan
  - "Drinking Song"
- Anna Laetitia Barbauld
  - "Life"
- Isobel Pagan
  - "Ca' the Yowes to the Knowes"
- Lady Anne Lindsay
  - "Auld Robin Gray"
- Thomas Chatterton
  - "Song from Ælla"
- Carolina Oliphant, Lady Nairne
  - "The Lond o' the Leal"
  - "He's Ower the Hills that I Lo'e Weel"
  - "The Auld House"
  - "The Laird o' Cockpen"
  - "The Rowan Tree"
  - "Wha'll be King but Charlie?"
  - "Charlie Is My Darling"
- Alexander Ross
  - "Wooed and Married and A'"
- John Skinner
  - "Tullochgorum"
- Michael Bruce
  - "To the Cuckoo"
- George Halket
  - "Logie o' Buchan"
- William Hamilton of Bangour
  - "The Braes of Yarrow"
- Hector MacNeil
  - "I Lo'ed Ne'er a Laddie but Ane"
  - "Come Under My Plaidie"
- Sir William Jones
  - "An Ode"
  - "On Parent Knees a Naked New-born Child"
- Susanna Blamire
  - "And Ye Shall Walk in Silk Attire"
- Anne Hunter
  - "My Mother Bids Me Bind My Hair"
- John Dunlop
  - "The Year, That's Awa'"
- Samuel Rogers
  - "A Wish"
  - "The Sleeping Beauty"
- William Blake
  - "The Tiger"
  - "Ah! Sun-flower"
  - "To Spring"
  - "Reeds of Innocence"
  - "Night"
  - "Auguries of Innocence"
  - "Nurse's Song"
  - "Holy Thursday"
  - "The Divine Image"
  - "Song"
- John Collins
  - "To-Morrow"
- Robert Tannahill
  - "Jessie, the Flower o' Dunblane"
  - "Gloomy Winter's Now Awa'"
- William Wordsworth
  - "Ode on Intimations of Immortality from Recollections of Early Childhood"
  - "My Heart Leaps Up"
  - "The Two April Mornings"
  - "The Fountain"
  - "Written in March"
  - "Nature and the Poet"
  - "Ruth: Or the Influence of Nature"
  - "A Lesson"
  - "Michael"
  - "Yarrow Unvisited"
  - "Yarrow Visited"
  - "Yarrow Revisited"
  - "Lines Composed a Few Miles Above Tintern Abbey"
  - "The Daffodils"
  - "To the Daisy"
  - "To the Cuckoo"
  - "The Green Linnet"
  - "Written in Early Spring"
  - "To the Skylark"
  - "The Affliction of Margaret"
  - "Simon Lee the Old Huntsman"
  - "Ode to Duty"
  - "She Was a Phantom of Delight"
  - "To the Highland Girl of Inversneyde"
  - "The Solitary Reaper"
  - "The Reverie of Poor Susan"
  - "To Toussaint L'Ouverture"
  - "Character of the Happy Warrior"
  - "Resolution and Independence"
  - "Laodamia"
  - "We Are Seven"
  - "Lucy"
  - "The Inner Vision"
  - "By the Sea"
  - "Upon Westminster Bridge"
  - "To a Distant Friend"
  - "Desiseria"
  - "We Must Be Free or Die"
  - "England and Switzerland"
  - "On the Extinction of the Venetian Republic"
  - "London, MDCCCII"
  - "The Same"
  - "When I Have Borne"
  - "The World is Too Much With Us"
  - "Within King's College Chapel, Cambridge"
  - "Valedictory Sonnet to the River Duddon"
  - "Composed at Neidpath Castle, the Property of Lord Queensbury"
  - "Admonition to a Traveller"
  - "To Sleep"
  - "The Sonnet"
- William Lisle Bowles
  - "Dover Cliffs"
- Samuel Taylor Coleridge
  - The Rime of the Ancient Mariner
  - "Kubla Khan"
  - "Youth and Age"
  - "Love"
  - "Hymn Before Sunrise, in the Vale of Chamouni"
  - Christabel
  - "Dejection: an Ode"
- Robert Southey
  - "After Blenheim"
  - "The Scholar"
- Charles Lamb
  - "The Old Familiar Faces"
  - "Hester"
  - "On an Infant Dying as Soon as Born"
- Sir Walter Scott
  - "The Outlaw"
  - "To a Lock of Hair"
  - "Jock of Hazeldean"
  - "Eleu Loro"
  - "A Serenade"
  - "The Rover"
  - "The Maid of Neidpath"
  - "Gathering Song of Donald the Black"
  - "Border Ballad"
  - "The Pride of Youth"
  - "Coronach"
  - "Lucy Ashton's Song"
  - "Answer"
  - "Rosabelle"
  - "Hunting Song"
  - "Lochinvar"
  - "Bonny Dundee"
  - "Datur Hora Quieti"
  - "Here's a Health to King Charles
  - "Harp of the North, Farewell!"
- James Hogg
  - "Kilmeny"
  - "When the Kye Comes Hame"
  - "The Skylark"
  - "Lock the Door, Lariston"
- Robert Surtees
  - "Barthram's Dirge"
- Thomas Campbell
  - "The Soldier's Dream"
  - "To the Evening Star"
  - "Ode to Winter"
  - "Lord Ullin's Daughter"
  - "The River of Life"
  - "To the Evening Star"
  - "The Maid of Neidpath"
  - "Ye Mariners of England"
  - "Battle of the Baltic"
  - "Hohenlinden"
- J. Campbell
  - "Freedom and Love"
- Allan Cunningham
  - "Hame, Hame, Hame"
  - "A Wet Sheet and a Flowing Sea"
- George Gordon, Lord Byron
  - "Youth and Age"
  - "The Destruction of Sennacherib"
  - "Elegy on Thyrza"
  - "When We Two Parted"
  - "For Music"
  - "She Walks in Beauty"
  - "All for Love"
  - "Elegy"
  - "To Augusta"
  - "Epistle to Augusta"
  - "Maid of Athens"
  - "Darkness"
  - "Longing"
  - "Fare Thee Well"
  - The Prisoner of Chillon
  - "On the Castle of Chillon"
  - "Song of Saul, Before His Last Battle"
  - "The Isles of Greece"
  - "On This Day I Complete My Thirty-Sixth Year"
- Thomas Moore
  - "The Light of Other Days"
  - "Pro Patria Mori"
  - "The Meeting of the Waters"
  - "The Last Rose of Summer"
  - "The Harp that Once Through Tara's Halls"
  - "A Canadian Boat-Song"
  - "The Journey Onwards"
  - "The Young May Moon"
  - "Echo"
  - "At the Mid Hour of Night"
- Charles Wolfe
  - "The Burial of Sir John Moore at Corunna
- Percy Bysshe Shelley
  - "Hymn of Pan"
  - Hellas
  - "Invocation"
  - "Stanzas Written in Dejection Near Naples"
  - "I Fear Thy Kisses"
  - "Lines to an Indian Air"
  - "To a Skylark"
  - "Love's Philosophy"
  - "To the Night"
  - "Ode to the West Wind"
  - "Written Among the Euganean Hills, North Italy"
  - "Hymn to the Spirit of Nature"
  - "A Lament"
  - "A Dream of the Unknown"
  - "The Invitation"
  - "The Recollection"
  - "To the Moon"
  - "A Widow Bird"
  - "To a Lady, with a Guitar"
  - "One Word is Too Often Profaned"
  - "Ozymandias of Egypt"
  - "The Flight of Love"
  - "The Cloud"
  - "Stanzas–April, 1814"
  - "Music, When Soft Voices Die"
  - "The Poet's Dream"
  - "The World's Wanderers"
  - Adonaïs
- James Henry Leigh Hunt
  - "Jenny kiss'd Me"
  - "Abou Ben Adhem"
- John Keats
  - "The Realm of Fancy"
  - "Ode on the Poets"
  - "The Mermaid Tavern"
  - "Happy Insensibility"
  - "Ode to a Nightingale"
  - "Ode on a Grecian Urn"
  - "Ode to Autumn"
  - "Ode to Psyche"
  - "Ode on Melancholy"
  - "The Eve of St. Agnes"
  - "La Belle Dame Sans Merci"
  - "On the Grasshopper and Cricket"
  - "On First Looking into Chapman's Homer"
  - "To Sleep"
  - "The Human Seasons"
  - "Great Spirits Now on Earth are Sojourning"
  - "The Terror of Death"
  - "Last Sonnet"
- Walter Savage Landor
  - "Rose Aylmer"
  - "Twenty Years Hence"
  - "Proud Word You Never Spoke"
  - "Absence"
  - "Dirce"
  - "Corinna to Tanagra, from Athens"
  - "Mother, I Cannot Mind My Wheel"
  - "Well I Remember"
  - "No, My Own Love"
  - "Robert Browning"
  - "The Death of Artemidora"
  - "Iphigeneia"
  - "'Do You Remember Me?'"
  - "For an Epitaph at Fiesole"
  - "On Lucretia Borgia's Hair"
  - "On His Seventy-Fifth Birthday"
  - "To My Ninth Decade"
  - "Death Stands Above Me"
  - "On Living Too Long"
- Thomas Hood
  - "Fair Ines"
  - "The Bridge of Sighs"
  - "The Death Bed"
  - "Past and Present"
- Sir Aubrey de Vere
  - "Glengariff"
- Hartley Coleridge
  - "She Is Not Fair"
- Joseph Blanco White
  - "To Night"
- George Darley
  - "The Loveliness of Love"
- Thomas Babington Macaulay, Lord Macaulay
  - "The Armada"
  - "A Jacobite's Epitaph"
- Sir William Edmondstoune Aytoune
  - "The Refusal of Charon"
- Hugh Miller
  - "The Babie"
- Helen Selina, Lady Dufferin
  - "Lament of the Irish Emigrant"
- Charles Tennyson Turner
  - "Letty's Globe"
- Sir Samuel Ferguson
  - "The Fair Hills of Ireland"
- Elizabeth Barrett Browning
  - "A Musical Instrument"
  - "Sonnets from the Portuguese, 1-44"
  - "The Sleep"
- Edward Fitzgerald
  - "Rubaiyat of Omar Khayyam of Naishápúr"

==== Vol. 42. English Poetry 3: Tennyson to Whitman ====
"The Harvard classics Volume 42". Internet Archive. 26 January 2017.

- Alfred, Lord Tennyson
  - "The Lady of Shalott"
  - "Sweet and Low"
  - "Tears, Idle Tears"
  - "Blow, Bugle Blow"
  - "Home They Brought Her Warrior Dead"
  - "Now Sleeps the Crimson Petal"
  - "O Swallow, Swallow"
  - "Break, Break, Break"
  - "In the Valley of Cauteretz"
  - "Vivien's Song"
  - "Enid's Song"
  - "Ulysses"
  - "Locksley Hall"
  - "Morte D'Arthur"
  - "The Lotos-Eaters"
  - "You Ask Me, Why"
  - "Love Thou Thy Land"
  - "Sir Galahad"
  - "The Higher Pantheism"
  - "Flower in the Crannied Wall"
  - "Wages"
  - "The Charge of the Light Brigade"
  - "The Revenge"
  - "Rizpah"
  - "To Virgil"
  - "Maud"
  - "Crossing the Bar"
- Richard Monckton Milnes, Lord Houghton
  - "Sonnet"
- William Makepeace Thackray
  - "The End of the Play"
- Charles Kingsley
  - "Airly Beacon"
  - "The Sands of Dee"
  - "Youth and Old"
  - "Ode to the North-east Wind"
- J. Wilson
  - "The Canadian Boat Song"
- Robert Browning
  - "Prospice"
  - "How They Brought the Good News from Ghent to Aix"
  - The Lost Leader
  - Home-thoughts, from Abroad
  - "Home-thoughts, from the Sea"
  - "Parting at Morning"
  - "The Lost Mistress"
  - "The Last Ride Together"
  - "Pippa's Song"
  - "You'll Love Me Yet"
  - "My Last Duchess"
  - "The Bishop Orders His Tomb at Saint Praxed's Church"
  - "Evelyn Hope"
  - "A Toccata of Galuppi's"
  - "Memorabilia"
  - "The Patriot"
  - "The Grammarian's Funeral"
  - "Andrea del Sarto"
  - "One Word More"
  - "Abt Volger"
  - "Rabbi Ben Ezra"
  - Dedication of The Ring and the Book
  - "Epilogue"
- Emily Brontë
  - Last Lines
  - "The Old Stoic"
- Robert Stephen Hawker
  - "And Shall Trelawny Die?"
- Coventry Patmore
  - "Departure"
- William (Johnson) Cory
  - Heraclitus
  - "Mimnermus in Church"
- Sydney Dobell
  - "The Ballad of Keith of Ravelston"
- William Allingham
  - "The Fairies"
- George Mac Donald
  - "That Holy Thing"
  - "Baby"
- Edward, Earl of Lytton
  - "The Last Wish"
- Arthur Hugh Clough
  - "Say Not the Struggle Naught Availeth"
  - "The Stream of Life"
  - "In a London Square"
  - "Qua Cursum Ventus"
  - "Where Lies the Land"
- Matthew Arnold
  - "The Forsaken Merman"
  - "The Song of the Callicles"
  - "To Marguerite"
  - "Requiescat"
  - "Rugby Chapel"
  - "Memorial Verses"
  - "Dover Beach"
  - "The Better Part"
  - "Worldly Place"
  - "The Last Word"
- George Meredith
  - "Love in the Valley"
- Alexander Smith
  - "Barbara"
- Charles Dickens
  - "The Ivy Green"
- Thomas Edward Brown
  - "My Garden"
- James Thomson (B.V.)
  - "Gifts"
- Dante Gabriel Rossetti
  - "The Blessed Damozel"
  - "The Kings Tragedy"
  - "Lovesight"
  - "Heart's Hope"
  - "Genius in Beauty"
  - "Silent Noon"
  - "Love-Sweetness"
  - "Heart's Compass"
  - "Her Gifts"
- Christina Georgina Rossetti
  - "Song"
  - "Remember"
  - "Up-Hill"
  - "In the Round Tower at Jhansi"
- William Morris
  - "The Defence of Guenevere"
  - Prologue of The Earthly Paradise
  - "The Nymph's Song to Hylas"
  - "The Day Is Coming"
  - "The Days That Were"
- John Boyle O'Reilly
  - "A White Rose"
- Arthur William Edgar O'Shaughnessy
  - "Ode"
- Robert Williams Buchanan
  - "Liz"
- Algernon Charles Swinburne
  - Chorus from "Atalanta"
  - "Itylus"
  - "The Garden of Proserpine"
  - "A Match"
  - "A Forsaken Garden"
- William Ernest Henley
  - "Margaritæ Sorori"
  - "Invictus"
  - "England, My England"
- Robert Louis Stevenson
  - "In the Highlands"
  - "The Celestial Surgeon"
  - "Requiem"
- William Cullen Bryant
  - "Thanatopsis"
  - "Robert of Lincoln"
  - "Song of Marion's Men"
  - "June"
  - "The Past"
  - "To a Waterfowl"
  - "The Death of Lincoln"
- Edgar Allan Poe
  - "Lenore"
  - "The Haunted Palace
  - "To Helen"
  - "The Raven"
  - "Ulalume"
  - "The Bells"
  - "To My Mother"
  - "For Annie"
  - "Annabel Lee"
  - "The Conqueror Worm"
- Ralph Waldo Emerson
  - "Good-Bye"
  - "The Apology"
  - "Brahma
  - "Days"
  - "Give All to Love"
  - "Concord Hymn"
  - "The Humble-Bee"
  - "The Problem"
  - "Woodnotes"
  - "Boston Hymn"
- Henry Wadsworth Longfellow
  - "A Psalm of Life"
  - "The Light of Stars"
  - "Hymn to the Night"
  - "Footsteps of Angels"
  - "The Wreck of the Hesperus"
  - "The Village Blacksmith"
  - "Serenade"
  - "The Rainy Day"
  - "The Day is Gone"
  - "The Bridge"
  - "Resignation"
  - "Children"
  - "The Building of the Ship"
  - "My Lost Youth"
  - "The Fiftieth Birthday of Agassiz"
  - "The Children's Hour"
  - "Paul Revere's Ride"
  - "Killed at the Ford"
  - Evangeline
- John Greenleaf Whittier
  - "The Eternal Goodness"
  - "Randolph of Roanoke"
  - "Massachusetts to Virginia"
  - "Barclay of Ury"
  - "Maud Muller"
  - "The Barefoot Boy"
  - "Skipper Ireson's Ride"
  - "The Pipes at Lucknow"
  - "Barbara Frietchie"
- Oliver Wendell Holmes
  - "The Chambered Nautilus"
  - "Old Ironsides"
  - "The Last Leaf"
  - "Contentment"
- James Russell Lowell
  - "The Present Crisis"
  - "The Pious Editor's Creed"
  - "The Courtin'"
  - "Ode Recited at the Harvard Commemoration"
- Sidney Lanier
  - "The Marshes of Glynn"
  - "The Revenge of Hamish"
  - "How Love Looked for Hell"
- Bret Harte
  - "The Reveille"
- Walt Whitman
  - "One's Self I Sing"
  - "Beat! Beat! Drums!"
  - "Vigil Strange I Kept on the Field One Night"
  - "Pioneers! O Pioneers!"
  - "Ethiopia Saluting the Colors"
  - "The Wound Dresser"
  - "Give me the Splendid Silent Sun"
  - "O Captain! My Captain!"
  - "When Lilacs Last in the Dooryard Bloom'd"
  - "Prayer of Columbus"
  - "The Last Invocation"

==== Vol. 43. American Historical Documents ====
"The Harvard Classics Volume 43". Internet Archive. 12 January 2006.

- Introductory Note
  - "The Voyages to Vinland" (c. 1000)
  - "The Letter of Columbus to Luis de Sant Angel Announcing His Discovery" (1493)
  - "Amerigo Vespucci's Account of His First Voyage" (1497)
  - "John Cabot's Discovery of North America" (1497)
  - "First Charter of Virginia" (1606)
  - "The Mayflower Compact" (1620)
  - "The Fundamental Orders of Connecticut" (1639)
  - "The Massachusetts Body of Liberties" (1641)
  - "Arbitrary Government Described and the Government of the Massachusetts Vindicated from that Aspersion", by John Winthrop (1644)
  - "The Instrument of Government" (1653)
  - "A Healing Question", by Sir Henry Vane" (1656)
  - "John Eliot's "Brief Narrative" (1670)
  - "Declaration of Rights" (1765)
  - "The Declaration of Independence" (1776)
  - "The Mecklenburg Declaration of Independence" (1775)
  - "Articles of Confederation" (1777)
  - "Articles of Capitulation, Yorktown" (1781)
  - "Treaty with Great Britain" (1783)
  - "Constitution of the United States" (1787)
  - "The Federalist", Nos. 1 and 2 (1787)
  - "Opinion of Chief Justice Marshall, in the Case of McCulloch vs. the State of Maryland" (1819)
  - "Washington's First Inaugural Address" (1789)
  - "Treaty with the Six Nations" (1794)
  - "Washington's Farewell Address" (1796)
  - "Treaty with France (Louisiana Purchase)" (1803)
  - "Treaty with Great Britain (End of War of 1812)" (1814)
  - "Arrangement as to the Naval Force to Be Respectively Maintained on the American Lakes" (1817)
  - "Treaty with Spain (Acquisition of Florida)" (1819)
  - "The Monroe Doctrine" (1823)
  - "Webster-Ashburton Treaty with Great Britain" (1842)
  - "Treaty with Mexico (1848)
  - "Fugitive Slave Act" (1850)
  - "Lincoln's First Inaugural Address" (1861)
  - "Emancipation Proclamation" (1863)
  - "Haskell's Account of the Battle of Gettysburg"
  - "Lincoln's Gettysburg Address" (1863)
  - "Proclamation of Amnesty" (1863)
  - "Lincoln's Letter to Mrs. Bixby" (1864)
  - "Terms of Lee's Surrender at Appomattox" (1865)
  - "Lee's Farewell to His Army" (1865)
  - "Lincoln's Second Inaugural Address" (1865)
  - "Proclamation Declaring the Insurrection at an End" (1866)
  - "Treaty with Russia (Alaska Purchase)" (1867)
  - "Annexation of the Hawaiian Islands" (1898)
  - "Recognition of the Independence of Cuba" (1898)
  - "Treaty with Spain (Cession of Porto Rico and the Philippines)" (1898)
  - "Convention Between the United States and the Republic of Panama" (1904)

==== Vol. 44. Sacred Writings: Volume 1 ====
"The Harvard Classics Volume 44". Internet Archive. 14 January 2006.

Confucian

- The Sayings of Confucius

Hebrew

- The Book of Job
- The Book of Psalms
- Ecclesiastes; Or, The Preacher

Christian, (Part I)

- The Gospel According to Luke
- The Acts of the Apostles

==== Vol. 45. Sacred Writings: Volume 2 ====
"The Harvard Classics Volume 45". Internet Archive. 12 January 2006.

Christian, (Part II)

- The First Epistle of Paul to the Corinthians
- The Second Epistle of Paul to the Corinthians
- Hymns of the Christian Church
  - Hymns based on Psalms
    - Psalms XIX
    - Psalms XXIII
    - Psalms LXXII
    - Psalms XC
    - Psalms C
    - Psalms CIV
  - Greek hymns
    - Gloria in Excelsis—Shepherd of Tender Youth
    - The Day is Past and Over
    - The Day of Resurrection
    - Art Thou Weary?
  - Latin hymns
    - Te Deum Laudamus
    - Veni Creator Spiritus
    - Hie Breve Vivitur
    - Urbs Sion Aurea
    - Jesu, Dulcis Memoria—Jesu, Dulcedo Cordium
    - Dies Iræ, Dies Illa
    - Stabat Mater
    - Adeste Fideles
    - O Deus, Ego Amo Te
  - Modern hymns
    - A Mighty Fortress Is Our God
    - Now Thank We All Our God
    - Be Not Dismayed—In Temptation
    - Christmas Hymn
    - Light Shining out of Darkness
    - The Future Peace and Glory of the Church
    - Early Piety
    - The Holy Trinity
    - Epiphany—Sun of my Soul, Thou Savior Dear
    - Abide with Me
    - Pillar of cloud
    - Nearer, My God, to Thee
    - My Faith Looks Up to Thee
    - A Sun-Day Hymn
    - The Pilgrims of the Night
    - Let There Be Light
Buddhist
- Buddhist Writings, Translated and Annotated by Henry Clarke Warren
1. The Buddha
  The story of Sumedha
  The birth of the Buddha
  The attainment of Buddhaship
  First events after the attainment
  The Buddha's daily habits
  The death of the Buddha
2. The Doctrine
  Questions which tend not to edification
  There is no ego
  The middle doctrine
  Karma
  Fruitful and barren karma
  Good and bad karma
  Rebirth is not transmigration
  Death's messengers
  The Devoted Wife
  The hare-mark in the moon
  The way of purity
  Concentration
  The conversion of animals
  Love for animals
  Sariputta and the two demons
  The summum bonum
  The Trance of Cessation
  The attainment of nirvana
3. The Order
  The Admission and Ordination Ceremonies
  The Mendicant Ideal
  “And Hate Not His Father and Mother”
  The Story of Visakha

Hindu

- The Bhagavad Gita or Song Celestial, Translated by Sir Edwin Arnold
Islam
- Chapters from the Koran, Translated and Annotated by E. H. Palmer
  - Mecca Suras
  - Medina Suras

==== Vol. 46. Elizabethan Drama 1 ====
"The Harvard Classics Volume 46". Internet Archive. 12 January 2006.

- Edward the Second, by Christopher Marlowe
- Hamlet, King Lear, Macbeth, and The Tempest, by William Shakespeare

==== Vol. 47. Elizabethan Drama 2 ====
"The Harvard Classics Volume 47". Internet Archive. 14 January 2006.

- The Shoemaker's Holiday, by Thomas Dekker
- The Alchemist, by Ben Jonson
- Philaster, by Beaumont and Fletcher
- The Duchess of Malfi, by John Webster
- A New Way to Pay Old Debts, by Philip Massinger

==== Vol. 48. Thoughts and Minor Works, Pascal ====
"The Harvard Classics Volume 48". Internet Archive. 17 January 2006.

- Thoughts, letters, and minor works, by Blaise Pascal

==== Vol. 49. Epic and Saga ====
"The Harvard Classics Volume 49". Internet Archive. 16 January 2006.

- Beowulf
- The Song of Roland
- The Destruction of Dá Derga's Hostel
- The Story of the Volsungs and Niblungs
- Songs from The Elder Edda

==== Vol. 50. Introduction, Reader's Guide, Indexes ====
"The Harvard Classics Volume 50". Internet Archive. 17 January 2006.

- The Editor's Introduction to the Harvard Classics
- Reader's Guide to the Harvard Classics
  - Class I
    - The History of Civilization
      - Race and Language
      - Ancient Egypt
      - The East in Patriarchal Time
      - Ancient Greece: Legendary
      - Ancient Greece: Historic
      - Ancient Rome: Republican
      - Ancient Rome: Imperial
      - Germanic Peoples in Primitive Times
      - Ireland in Primitive Times
      - The Early Christian Church
      - The Mohammedan East
      - The Middle Ages
      - The Renaissance
      - Modern Europe
      - America
    - Religion and Philosophy
      - Hebrew
      - Greek
      - Roman
      - Chinese
      - Hindu
      - Christian: Primitive and Medieval
      - Mohammedan
      - Christian: Modern
      - Modern Philosophers
    - Education
      - Montaigne...Huxley
    - Science
      - Hippocrates...Geikie
    - Politics
      - Plutarch...American Historical Documents
    - Voyages and Travels
      - Herodotus...Emerson
    - Criticism of Literature and the Fine Arts
      - Caxton...Stevenson
  - Class II
    - Drama
      - Greek
      - English
      - Spanish
      - French
      - German
    - Biography and Letters
      - Plutarch...Stevenson
    - Essays
      - Montaigne...Stevenson
    - Narrative Poetry and Prose Fiction
      - Homer...Lanier
- An Index of the First Lines of Poems, Songs and Choruses, Hymns and Psalms
- General Index
- Chronological Index

=== Lectures ===
Lectures on The Harvard Classics

==== Lectures on The Harvard Classics ====
"Lectures on The Harvard Classics". Internet Archive. 17 January 2006.

The last volume contains sixty lectures introducing and summarizing the covered fields:

- History
  - "General Introduction", by Robert Matteson Johnston
  - "Ancient History", by William Scott Ferguson
  - "The French Revolution", by Robert Matteson Johnston
  - "The Renaissance", by Murray Anthony Potter
  - "The Territorial Development of the United States", by Fredrick Jackson Turner
- Poetry
  - "General Introduction", by Carlton Noyes
  - "Homer and the Epic", by Charles Burton Gulick
  - "Dante", by Charles Hall Grandgent
  - "The Poems of John Milton", by Ernest Bernbaum
  - "The English Anthology", by Carleton Noyes
- Natural Science
  - "General Introduction", by Lawrence Joseph Henderson
  - "Astronomy", by Lawrence Joseph Henderson
  - "Physics and Chemistry", by Lawrence Joseph Henderson
  - "The Biological Sciences", by Lawrence Joseph Henderson
  - "Kelvin on 'Light' and 'The Tides'", by William Morris Davis
- Philosophy
  - "General Introduction", by Ralph Barton Perry
  - "Socrates, Plato, and the Roman Stoics", by Charles Pomeroy Parker
  - "The Rise of Modern Philosophy", by Ralph Barton Perry
  - "Introduction to Kant", by Ralph Barton Perry
  - "Emerson", by Chester Noyes Greenough
- Biography
  - "General Introduction", William Roscoe Thayer,
  - "Plutarch", by William Scott Ferguson,
  - "Benvenuto Cellini", by Chandler Rathfon Post
  - "Franklin and Woolman", by Chester Noyes Greenough
  - "John Stuart Mill", by Oliver Mitchell Wentworth
- Prose Fiction
  - "General Introduction" by William Allan Neilson,
  - "Popular Prose Fiction" by Fred Norris Robinson,
  - "Malory", by Gustavus Howard Maynadier
  - "Cervantes", by Jeremiah D. M. Ford
  - "Manzoni" by Jeremiah D. M. Ford
- Criticism and the Essay
  - "General Introduction", by Bliss Perry
  - "What the Middle Ages Read", by William Allan Neilson
  - "Theories of Poetry", by Bliss Perry
  - "Æsthetic Criticism in Germany", by William Guild Howard
  - "The Composition of a Criticism", by Ernest Bernbaum
- Education
  - "General Introduction", by Henry Wyman Holmes
  - "Francis Bacon", by Ernest Bernbaum
  - "Locke and Milton", by Henry Wyman Holmes
  - "Carlyle and Newman", by Frank Wilson Cheney Hersey
  - "Huxley on Science and Culture", by A. O. Norton
- Political Science
  - "General Introduction", by Thomas Nixon Carver
  - "Theories of Government in the Renaissance", by O. M. W. Sprague
  - "Adam Smith and 'The Wealth of Nations'", by Charles J. Bullock
  - "The Growth of the American Constitution" by William Bennett Munro
  - "Law and Liberty", by Roscoe Pound
- Drama
  - "General Introduction", by George Pierce Baker
  - "Greek Tragedy", by Charles Burton Gulick
  - "The Elizabethan Drama", by William Allan Neilson
  - "The Faust Legend", by Kuno Francke
  - "Modern English Drama", by Ernest Bernbaum
- Voyages and Travel
  - "General Introduction", by Roland Burrage Dixon
  - "Herodotus on Egypt", by George H. Chase
  - "The Elizabethan Adventurers", by William Allan Neilson
  - "The Era of Discovery", by William Bennett Monro
  - "Darwin's Voyage of the Beagle", by George Howard Parker
- Religion
  - "General Introduction", by Ralph Barton Perry
  - "Buddhism", by Charles Rockwell Lanman
  - "Confucianism", by Dwight Sheffield
  - "Greek Religion", by Clifford Herschel Moore
  - "Pascal", by Charles Henry Conrad Wright

== The Harvard Classics Shelf of Fiction ==
The Harvard Classics Shelf of Fiction is a supplement of 20 volumes of modern fiction added in 1917. Items were selected for inclusion by Charles W. Eliot, with notes and introductions by William Allan Neilson.

- Vol. 1. HENRY FIELDING 1
  - The History of Tom Jones, part 1, by Henry Fielding
- Vol. 2. HENRY FIELDING 2
  - The History of Tom Jones, part 2, by Henry Fielding
- Vol. 3. LAURENCE STERNE, JANE AUSTEN
  - A Sentimental Journey, by Laurence Sterne
  - Pride and Prejudice, by Jane Austen
- Vol. 4. SIR WALTER SCOTT
  - Guy Mannering, by Sir Walter Scott
- Vol. 5. WILLIAM MAKEPEACE THACKERAY 1
  - Vanity Fair, part 1, by William Makepeace Thackeray
- Vol. 6. WILLIAM MAKEPEACE THACKERAY 2
  - Vanity Fair, part 2, by William Makepeace Thackeray
- Vol. 7. CHARLES DICKENS 1
  - David Copperfield, part 1, by Charles Dickens
- Vol. 8. CHARLES DICKENS 2
  - David Copperfield, part 2, by Charles Dickens
- Vol. 9. GEORGE ELIOT
  - The Mill on the Floss, by George Eliot
- Vol. 10. HAWTHORNE, IRVING, POE, BRET HARTE, MARK TWAIN, HALE
  - The Scarlet Letter and "Rappaccini's Daughter", by Nathaniel Hawthorne
  - "Rip Van Winkle" and "The Legend of Sleepy Hollow", by Washington Irving
  - "Eleonora", "The Fall of the House of Usher", and "The Purloined Letter", by Edgar Allan Poe
  - "The Luck of Roaring Camp", "The Outcasts of Poker Flat", and The Idyl of Red Gulch, by Francis Bret Harte
  - "Jim Smiley and His Jumping Frog", by Samuel L. Clemens
  - The Man Without a Country, by Edward Everett Hale
- Vol. 11. HENRY JAMES JR.
  - The Portrait of a Lady, by Henry James
- Vol. 12. VICTOR HUGO
  - Notre Dame de Paris, by Victor Marie Hugo
- Vol. 13. BALZAC, SAND, DE MUSSET, DAUDET, DE MAUPASSANT
  - Old Goriot, by Honoré Balzac
  - The Devil's Pool, by George Sand
  - The Story of a White Blackbird, by Alfred de Musset
  - The Siege of Berlin, The Last Class—The Story of a Little Alsatian, The Child Spy, The Game of Billiards, and The Bad Zouave, by Alphonse Daudet
  - Walter Schnaffs' Adventure and Two Friends, by Guy de Maupassant
- Vol. 14. JOHANN WOLFGANG GOETHE
  - Wilhelm Meister's Apprenticeship, by Johann Wolfgang Goethe
- Vol. 15. GOETHE, KELLER, STORM, FONTANE
  - The Sorrows of Young Werther, by Johann Wolfgang Goethe
  - The Banner of the Upright Seven, by Gottfried Keller
  - The Rider on the White Horse, by Theodor Storm
  - Trials and Tribulations, by Theodor Fontane
- Vol. 16. LEO NIKOLAEVITCH TOLSTOY 1
  - Anna Karenina, part 1, by Leo Tolstoy
- Vol. 17. LEO NIKOLAEVITCH TOLSTOY 2
  - Anna Karenina, part 2, and Ivan the Fool, by Leo Tolstoy
- Vol. 18. FYODOR DOSTOEVSKY
  - Crime and Punishment, by Fyodor Dostoevsky
- Vol. 19. IVAN TURGENEV
  - A House of Gentlefolk and Fathers and Children, by Ivan Turgenev
- Vol. 20. VALERA, BJØRNSON, KIELLAND
  - Pepita Jimenez, by Juan Valera
  - A Happy Boy, by Bjørnstjerne Bjørnson
  - Skipper Worse, by Alexander L. Kielland

== Media ==
=== Television ===
The Waltons season 2 episode 24 "The Five-Foot Shelf", where a broke salesman (of the Harvard books) buys a doll for his daughter with Olivia's down-payment on a set of books.

=== Literature ===
Saul Bellow's The Adventures of Augie March makes several mentions of a signed copy of "Dr. Eliot's five-foot shelf" throughout.
