= Some Fruits of Solitude in Reflections and Maxims =

1682 collection by William Penn

Some Fruits of Solitude in Reflections and Maxims is a 1682 collection of epigrams and sayings put together by the early American Quaker leader William Penn. Like Benjamin Franklin's Poor Richard's Almanack the work collected the wisdom of pre-Revolutionary America. It is included in volume one of the Harvard Classics. The 1718 sequel was called More Fruits of Solitude.
