= Sonnet 108 =

« » Sonnet 108
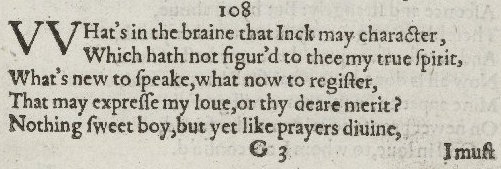
- The first five lines of Sonnet 108 in the 1609 Quarto
Q1
Q2
Q3
C
What’s in the brain, that ink may character,
Which hath not figur’d to thee my true spirit?
What’s new to speak, what new to register,
That may express my love, or thy dear merit?
Nothing, sweet boy; but yet, like prayers divine,
I must each day say o’er the very same,
Counting no old thing old, thou mine, I thine,
Even as when first I hallowed thy fair name.
So that eternal love in love’s fresh case
Weighs not the dust and injury of age,
Nor gives to necessary wrinkles place,
But makes antiquity for aye his page;
Finding the first conceit of love there bred,
Where time and outward form would show it dead.
—William Shakespeare
4
8
12
14

Sonnet 108 is one of 154 sonnets written by the English playwright and poet William Shakespeare. It is a member of the Fair Youth sequence, in which the poet expresses his love towards a young man.

== Paraphrase ==
Is there anything new I can say to express my love for you? No, sweet boy, there is nothing, but I must say the same things over again, like prayers to God, in order to keep eternal love fresh. The agedness of love disappears as it looks back to when it was first created, even though the passage of time would suggest it should by now have died.

== Structure ==
Sonnet 108 is an English or Shakespearean sonnet. The English sonnet has three quatrains, followed by a final rhyming couplet. It follows the typical rhyme scheme of the form ABAB CDCD EFEF GG and is composed in iambic pentameter, a type of poetic metre based on five pairs of metrically weak/strong syllabic positions. The 14th line exemplifies a regular iambic pentameter:

  ×    /   ×   /   ×    /    ×      /  ×   / 
Where time and outward form would show it dead. (108.14)

The sonnet exhibits many metrical variations. There are initial reversals in lines 1, 5, 7, 8, and 13; as well as potential initial reversals in lines 9 and 10. For example:

 /  ×     ×  /     ×  /   ×   /     ×     / 
Finding the first conceit of love there bred, (108.13)

Lines 2 and 4 have final extrametrical syllables or feminine endings. Line 2 is particularly complex. It may be regular (apart from the feminine ending) — or it may suggest a rightward movement of an ictus (resulting in a four-position figure, × × / /, sometimes referred to as a minor ionic), but if so, it is not clear which:

                    ×   ×   /   /   ×    /(×)
                    ×   /   ×   ×   /    /(×)
  ×    /    ×   /   ×   /   ×   /   ×    /(×)
Which hath not figured to thee my true spirit? (108.2)

/ = ictus, a metrically strong syllabic position. × = nonictus. (×) = extrametrical syllable.

The meter demands that line 8's "even" function as one syllable.
