= Sonnet 105 =

« » Sonnet 105
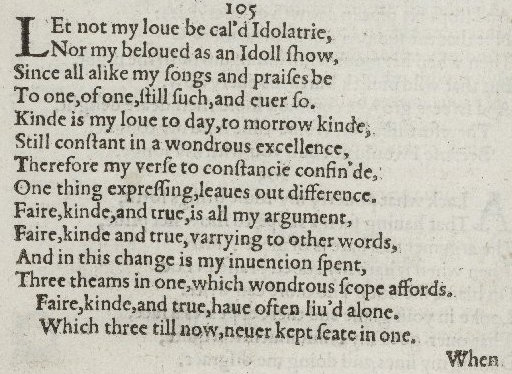
- Sonnet 105 in the 1609 Quarto
Q1
Q2
Q3
C
Let not my love be call’d idolatry,
Nor my beloved as an idol show,
Since all alike my songs and praises be
To one, of one, still such, and ever so.
Kind is my love to-day, to-morrow kind,
Still constant in a wondrous excellence;
Therefore my verse to constancy confin’d,
One thing expressing, leaves out difference.
“Fair, kind and true,” is all my argument,
“Fair, kind, and true,” varying to other words;
And in this change is my invention spent,
Three themes in one, which wondrous scope affords.
“Fair, kind, and true,” have often liv’d alone,
Which three till now never kept seat in one.
—William Shakespeare
4
8
12
14

Sonnet 105 is one of 154 sonnets written by the English playwright and poet William Shakespeare. It is a member of the Fair Youth sequence, in which the poet expresses his love towards a young man.

== Synopsis ==
The poet denies that his love is a form of idolatry and that the youth himself is an idol. He insists that he has been constantly devoted to the values of fairness, kindness and truth. Being three themes united in the figure of the youth, there is great scope for verse, since they have never been united in one person before.

The language used is similar in some respects to the language in the Book of Common Prayer used to describe the Holy Trinity, and Shakespeare's triple repetition of the three attributes of the Fair Youth - "Three themes in one" - makes plain his deliberate comparison of the youth to a form of deity or idol, even as he purports not to engage in idolatry (in the sense of polytheistic worship of idols).

== Structure ==
Sonnet 105 is an English or Shakespearean sonnet. The English sonnet has three quatrains, followed by a final rhyming couplet. It follows the typical rhyme scheme of the form ABAB CDCD EFEF GG and is composed in iambic pentameter, a type of poetic metre based on five pairs of metrically weak/strong syllabic positions. The 3rd line exemplifies a regular iambic pentameter:

  ×  /  ×   /   ×    /    ×  /   ×   / 
Since all alike my songs and praises be (105.3)

/ = ictus, a metrically strong syllabic position. × = nonictus.

The sonnet embraces a large number of stresses in normally non-stressed positions. These appear as inversions and non-ictic stresses, both of which appear in line 10:

 ×     /    ×     /    /  ×    × /  ×   / 
Fair, kind, and true, varying to other words; (105.10)

Here, both "fair" and "kind" are fully stressed, but in a regular reading only "kind" is metrically marked, "fair" being a non-ictic stress. In contrast, "varying" (which the meter demands function as two syllables) is a mid-line inversion. Both variations recur several times in this sonnet.

== Context ==
Sonnet 105 falls broadly into the group of Sonnets addressed to a "Fair Youth", which ranges from Sonnets 1-126. This group of sonnets address an unnamed youth who acted as the object of Shakespeare's love. The nature of that love has often been debated, namely whether it was romantic or platonic in nature, The consensus is generally that they are more romantic in nature, judging by the classic romantic language used in Sonnets like the famous 18th ("shall I compare thee to a Summer's day"), and the poet's lamentation that the youth was not born a woman in Sonnet 20. The youth's identity is also often disputed, and his true identity is not known for certain. However, one of the more probable candidates is that of Henry Wriothesley, the Earl of Southampton. This theory states that the Earl, one of Shakespeare's patrons, became the subject of Shakespeare's love, and the majority of the Sonnets are addressed to him. More specifically, Sonnet 105 occupies a group of sonnets within the Fair Youth sequence, from 97 to 105, that seem to indicate happiness at the return of Shakespeare's love, the addressee. In the group prior to this, the poet expressed sadness at his muse's extended absence. It appears, however, that the Fair Youth's return yielded a happier series of poems, in which Shakespeare describes the return of his muse and speaks of the youth with "a lighter heart, and once more exalts his virtues, truth and constancy" For historians like Massey, the sonnet is mainly an honest expression of happiness and joy at the chance to return to the lofty romance language that defined his more melancholy period.

Religious themes are also prevalent in this sonnet. The sonnets were published in 1609, composed during the reign of Queen Elizabeth I, who re-instituted The Anglican Church in England. One of the tenets of Protestantism was the belief that Catholic practices of worshiping the multitude of Saints and the Virgin Mary were practices of idolatry and were henceforth blasphemous. Hence, Shakespeare's claim against idolatry indicates his love is always directed at the same youth. Other interpretations make the claim that the religious nature of the poem is ironic, that Shakespeare is well aware that the love he describes is indeed idolatry. Scholar Jane Roessner states that "the speaker seems done with all efforts to persuade; now the sonnets are set up at once to deceive and reveal: to appear to be genuine praises ... while in fact covertly revealing the corruption of the friend, and ultimately, of the sonnets themselves which had at first seemed to be stays against corruption". Thus, the purpose behind the sonnet is one of intentional double standards. In addition, Shakespeare is playing with the religious perversity, using the Christian imagery as a way of describing his love.

== Criticism ==
Sonnet 105 invokes a strongly religious tone and is read by most critics as decidedly Christian, as it denies claims of idolatry and strongly alludes to the trinity. In his analysis, Brian Gibbons emphasizes the importance of the speaker's denial of idolatry; the speaker is following the first two commandments by practicing monotheism and not building any other idols or images. However, the speaker fundamentally breaks the Third Commandment by taking the name of the Lord in vain; "unorthodox monotheism is in Christian terms blasphemous." Gibbons views this oversight on the part of the poet as convenient and intentional rather than accidental.

Like Gibbons, Eugene Wright views this sonnet with a Christian lens, noting that the poet uses familiar Christian rhetoric and imagery to appeal to the reader. However, he argues that the speaker is not guilty of blasphemy because it is not the youth being praised, but the "qualities of 'Fair, kind, and true,' transcendent qualities the young man partakes of." According to Wright, the main idea of the poem is unity - the unity of the three qualities in the persona, never before seen in a strictly mortal man. The emphasis on three-in-one is not meant to replace the trinity or suggest that the beloved is divine or equivalent to Christ, but to echo the unity of the virtues and to evoke an image of perfection.

Carl Atkins' analysis undermines some of the more popular interpretations of this sonnet, largely because he emphasizes the possibility that the poet and the male beloved (or "Fair Youth") had a passionate but platonic friendship, devoid of sexual tension. Like Wright and Gibbons, Atkins picks up on the Christian imagery and emphasis on "fair, kind, and true" throughout the poem. However, he reads this sonnet through a more secular lens and stresses the speaker's love for his friend more than the poem's religious tone. The repetition of "fair, kind, and true" serve as a kind of method for making the beloved embody those virtues in the speaker's mind, if not in actuality. He defends this argument by pointing out the several preceding sonnets in which the beloved is distinctly not fair, kind, or true. Atkins' criticism also focuses on the illogicality of the speaker considering his love to be monotheistic and not idolatrous. He argues that the claim of a monotheism is "a very poor counter to an accusation of idolatry." The speaker in fact practices idolatry by praising his beloved as if the friend were a deity.
