= Sonnet 112 =

« » Sonnet 112
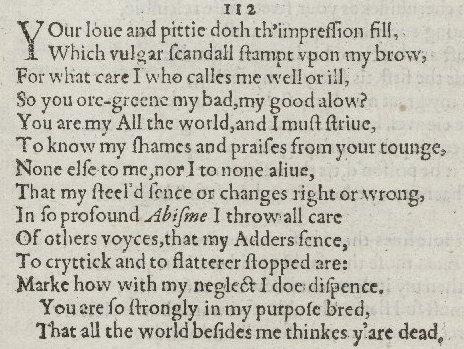
- Sonnet 112 in the 1609 Quarto
Q1
Q2
Q3
C
Your love and pity doth the impression fill
Which vulgar scandal stamp’d upon my brow;
For what care I who calls me well or ill,
So you o’er-green my bad, my good allow?
You are my all the world, and I must strive
To know my shames and praises from your tongue;
None else to me, nor I to none alive,
That my steel’d sense or changes right or wrong.
In so profound abysm I throw all care
Of others’ voices, that my adder’s sense
To critic and to flatterer stopped are.
Mark how with my neglect I do dispense:
You are so strongly in my purpose bred
That all the world besides methinks are dead.
—William Shakespeare
4
8
12
14

Sonnet 112 is one of 154 sonnets written by the English playwright and poet William Shakespeare. It is a member of the Fair Youth sequence, in which the poet expresses his love towards a young man. It is noted for its compressed and obscure language.

== Synopsis ==
The youth's sympathy is such that it conceals the badge of shame on the poet's brow. No-one else's opinion matters, since the youth covers the poet's misdeeds. The poet must learn to take the youth's estimate as the only one worthwhile. All other opinions are consigned to oblivion. His rejection of the rest of the world is so complete that the rest of the world may as well be dead.

== Commentary: notes on the vocabulary ==
Sonnet 112 in part picks up the thought of Sonnet 111, about the friend's pity effacing his brand of shame; 'impression' recalls Lucrece lines 1763-4 'The face, that map which deep impression bears /Of hard misfortune, carved in it with tears.' Isabella connects 'impression' and 'shame' in Measure for Measure Act II scene iv. The shame in this poem could be vocational (the theatre, suggested by 111), or sexual.

'Vulgar scandal' is an idiom Shakespeare has in common with Fulke Greville. 'Vulgar' is used in Shakespeare to refer to the base, the common, the popular: the speech by Henry IV to Hal deplores Hal making himself 'stale and cheap to vulgar company', in a speech that turns on the proper decorum of how a person should relate to the multitude.

'O'er-greene': 'o'er' is Shakespeare's common abbreviation for 'over' in the sonnets, notable parallels in Sonnets 43, 65, 139 ('o'er worn; o'er-sways; o'er-pressed').

'You are my all the world': 'world' is quite a common term in the hyperbolic language of the sonnets (28 occurrences in the sequence. 'All the world' is enormously common in the writing of the period, 'my all the world' is unique to Shakespeare, and points up the simple romantic phrase in the midst of the difficult language of this poem.

'my steel'd sense': 'steeled' is, when it appears, a military word in Shakespeare, but a transferred sense appears in Measure for Measure (IV ii): 'seldom when/ The steeled gaoler is the friend of men'.

'my Adders sense': editors cite Psalm 58: 'the deaf adder who stoppeth her ears', or see Henry VI Part 2, Act 3 scene 2: 'What! art thou, like the adder, waxen deaf?'. In Troilus and Cressida offers the sentiment that 'pleasure and revenge / Have ears more deaf than adders to the voice / Of any true decision'.

'Critic', in line 11, is of interest. The OED cites Shakespeare for its first use of the noun, critic, in the 1598 quarto of Loves Labours Lost. However, a double check using the Early English Books Online database will reveal 'critic' entering the language in the 1590s, from 1591, 'a certaine suspicious and suspected Criticke, emulous of his betters credite', and pushed into popularity by satirists like Everard Guilpin and John Marston. 'Critic' is a new word of the 1590s, used by Shakespeare in the pairing with 'flatterer', the latter term being one of very high frequency in the political literature of the period.

== The Final Couplet ==
The Q1609 text reads: 'You are so strongly in my purpose bred, / That all the world besides me thinkes y'are dead'. Malone's emendation, to read 'they are dead', is adopted by Kerrigan 'they're dead' (Penguin text, 1986); Ingram and Redpath read 'they are dead', with an elision marked between 'they' and 'are'; K Duncan Jones in the Arden edition (1997) reads 'me thinks you're dead', and Colin Burrow (New Oxford, 2002), 'me thinks y'are dead'. No scholarly consensus really emerges, but later editors seem to be opting for the 1609 text. Burrow's commentary remarks that 'This almost solipsistic reading of the couplet is contentious, though warranted by a poem in which the poet has sunk himself into a profound abysm of neglect of others' opinions'.

== Structure ==
Sonnet 112 is an English or Shakespearean sonnet. The English sonnet has three quatrains, followed by a final rhyming couplet. It follows the typical rhyme scheme of the form ABAB CDCD EFEF GG and is composed in iambic pentameter, a type of poetic metre based on five pairs of metrically weak/strong syllabic positions. The 2nd line exemplifies a regular iambic pentameter:

  ×    /  ×    /  ×    /     × /   ×   / 
Which vulgar scandal stamped upon my brow; (112.2)

/ = ictus, a metrically strong syllabic position. × = nonictus.

The sonnet has a few instances of metrical variations. Lines 5, 12, and 13 have initial reversals, for example:

 /    ×   ×    /  ×  /   ×  /  ×  / 
Mark how with my neglect I do dispense: (112.12)

And lines 6 and 8 potentially exhibit the rightward movement of an ictus (resulting in a four-position figure, × × / /, sometimes referred to as a minor ionic), for example:

  ×   ×   /      /    ×    /  ×   /    ×    / 
That my steeled sense or changes right or wrong. (112.8)

The meter demands a few variant pronunciations: the 1st line contains the three-syllable contraction "th'impression" and line 9's "abysm" is two syllables. In line 11, "flatterer stopped" must be 4 syllables; while likely "flatt'rer stoppėd" is intended, it is just possible (if a bit more awkward) to use "flatterer stopt".
