= To Marguerite: Continued =

"To Marguerite: Continued"

Yes: in the sea of life enisl'd,
With echoing straits between us thrown,
Dotting the shoreless watery wild,
We mortal millions live alone.
The islands feel the enclasping flow,
And then their endless bounds they know.

But when the moon their hollows lights
And they are swept by balms of spring,
And in their glens, on starry nights,
The nightingales divinely sing,
And lovely notes, from shore to shore,
Across the sounds and channels pour;

Oh then a longing like despair
Is to their farthest caverns sent;
—For surely once, they feel, we were
Parts of a single continent!
Now round us spreads the watery plain—
Oh might our marges meet again!

Who order'd, that their longing's fire
Should be, as soon as kindled, cool'd?
Who renders vain their deep desire?
A God, a God their severance rul'd;
And bade betwixt their shores to be
The unplumb'd, salt, estranging sea.

"To Marguerite: Continued" is a poem by Matthew Arnold. It was first published in Empedocles on Etna (1852), with the title, "To Marguerite, in Returning a Volume of the Letters of Ortis". In the 1857 edition, the poem is printed as a sequel to the poem "Isolation: To Marguerite." There, it first adopted the simplified title.

== Analysis ==
A metaphor is set up in the first stanza comparing humans to islands surrounded by life and the world around them, the sea. In one of his most famous lines "we mortal millions live alone" (where alone was originally italicized by the author) he bluntly states perhaps his largest complaint about dealing with community in the modern Victorian world. He wishes for a realistic connection as he speaks to someone that background implies he feels romantically for, but the tone of the poem, as well as the dark descriptions of a life lacking control, give the unresolved sentiment that this may never be possible. The metaphor looks to science in referencing an imagined land mass that once comprised all of the earth on the planet. By including science, Arnold expertly leads into his bitter complaint that the God of his modern world does not provide the same kind of faith and hope that he once did when facts and teleological reasoning weren't so important. While he attempts to reconcile the gap between human desires for community and love with a world that has left the individual very much to his own devices, the poem finds no resolution, but instead, looks to capture the feeling of sadness, lack of control, and isolation that accompanies this lack of conclusion.

Alternatively, it could be inferred that Arnold is the one thing left to depend on when orphaned by death in response to John Donne's "no man is an island." When a person is orphaned completely by surrounding deaths, there is, bitter as it may be, a God involved in this orchestration. The conclusion to be drawn is left up to the reader. It is a metaphor filled with the philosophical Problem of Evil. If God is all-powerful, all-knowing, and all-loving, how could He? Nevertheless, Arnold concludes He is there.
