= William Allan Neilson =

American lexicographer, teacher, and college president

- Born: 28 March 1869; Doune, Perthshire, Scotland
- Died: 13 February 1946 (aged 76); Northampton, Massachusetts, United States
- Occupations: Educator, writer, lexicographer and college president
- Board member of: G.C. Merriam and Co., NAACP, National Refugee Service
- Spouse: Elisabeth Muser

Academic background
- Education: University of Edinburgh, Harvard University

Academic work
- Discipline: English
- Institutions: Bryn Mawr College, Harvard University, Columbia University, Smith College
- Notable works: The Facts about Shakespeare

Signature
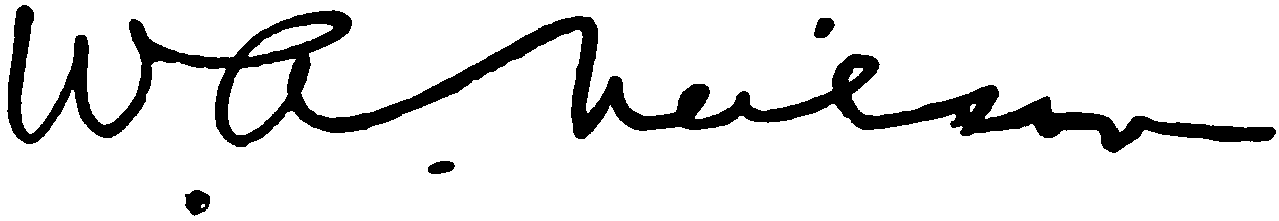

William Allan Neilson (28 March 1869 – 13 February 1946) was an American educator, writer and lexicographer, graduated in the University of Edinburgh in 1891 and became a PhD in Harvard University in 1898. He was president of Smith College between 1917 and 1939.

== Biography ==
Neilson was born in Doune, Scotland on 28 March 1869. He emigrated to the United States in 1895, being naturalised 3 August 1905. He taught at Bryn Mawr College from 1898 to 1900, Harvard from 1900 to 1904, Columbia from 1904 to 1906, and Harvard again from 1906 to 1917. He served as President of Smith College from 1917 to 1939. Neilson was author of a number of critical works on William Shakespeare, Robert Burns and the Elizabethan theatre, editor of the Cambridge and Tudor editions of Shakespeare (1906, 1911) and editor of Webster's New International Dictionary, Second Edition (1934). Less known is his translation of the famous late 14th-century Middle English alliterative chivalric romance Sir Gawain and the Green Knight.

Neilson was elected to the American Academy of Arts and Sciences in 1914 and the American Philosophical Society in 1944.

He died at the Smith College infirmary in Northampton, Massachusetts on 13 February 1946.

== Works ==
- The Origins and Sources of the "Court of Love" (1899)
- Milton's Minor Poems (1909); 1919 edition
- Essentials of Poetry (1912)
- with Ashley Horace Thorndike: The Facts About Shakespeare (1913)
- Lectures on the Harvard Classics (1914)
- Robert Burns, Project Gutenberg books.google (1917)
- Sir Gawain And The Green Knight (transl. by William Allan Neilson) (1917)
- with Ashley Horace Thorndike: History of English Literature (1920)
