= Sonnet 107 =

« » Sonnet 107
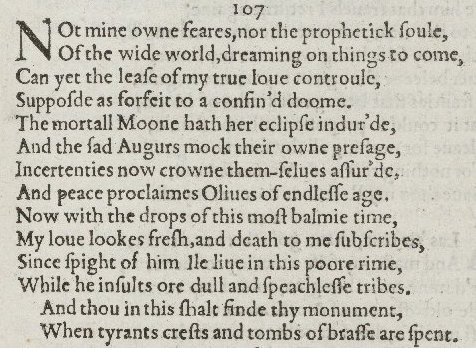
- Sonnet 107 in the 1609 Quarto
Q1
Q2
Q3
C
Not mine own fears, nor the prophetic soul
Of the wide world dreaming on things to come,
Can yet the lease of my true love control,
Suppos’d as forfeit to a confin’d doom.
The mortal moon hath her eclipse endur’d,
And the sad augurs mock their own presage;
Incertainties now crown themselves assur’d,
And peace proclaims olives of endless age.
Now with the drops of this most balmy time
My love looks fresh, and Death to me subscribes,
Since, spite of him, I’ll live in this poor rhyme,
While he insults o’er dull and speechless tribes:
And thou in this shalt find thy monument,
When tyrants’ crests and tombs of brass are spent.
—William Shakespeare
4
8
12
14

Sonnet 107 is one of 154 sonnets written by the English playwright and poet William Shakespeare. It is a member of the Fair Youth sequence, in which the poet expresses his love towards a young man.

== Synopsis ==
This poem repeats the theme of others, notably sonnet 18, that the poem itself will survive human mortality, and both the poet and Fair Youth will achieve immortality through it. In this case all the hazards of an unpredictable future are added to the inevitability of mortality.

== Structure ==
Sonnet 107 is an English or Shakespearean sonnet. The English sonnet has three quatrains, followed by a final rhyming couplet. It follows the typical rhyme scheme of the form ABAB CDCD EFEF GG and is composed in iambic pentameter, a type of poetic metre based on five pairs of metrically weak/strong syllabic positions. The 14th line exemplifies a regular iambic pentameter:

  ×   / ×       /    ×    /    ×    /   ×     / 
When tyrants' crests and tombs of brass are spent. (107.14)

/ = ictus, a metrically strong syllabic position. × = nonictus.

Frequent variations make this sonnet metrically complex. The 2nd line begins with the rightward movement of the first ictus (resulting in a four-position figure, × × / /, sometimes referred to as a minor ionic), and follows with a mid-line reversal ("dreaming"), which places three ictuses in a row:

×    ×  /    /      /  ×   ×    /     ×  / 
Of the wide world dreaming on things to come, (107.2)

Both of these metrical variations reappear in the poem: Mid-line reversals occur in lines 1 and 8, and an initial reversal occurs in line 9. Minor ionics occur in line 6 and potentially in lines 3 and 11.

In line 4, "confin'd" is "double-stressed in Shakespeare's English, and follow[s] the Alternating Stress Rule", moving its principal stress to the first syllable in the context of "confin'd doom".

== Analysis ==
The line about the eclipse of the moon has sometimes been interpreted as reference to death of Queen Elizabeth I

Sonnet 107 can also be seen as referring to Doomsday. The sonneteer's love cannot even be ended by the "confined doom." The eclipse of the moon, then, like the "sad augurs," refers to a sign that might presage the Last Judgment. While everything else (the "tombs of brass" for example) comes to an end, the "poor rhyme" will be the last thing to go. As in Sonnet 55, the power of the sonnet to give life to the young man—or, here, to serve as a monument to him—will only be overshadowed when that young man literally comes forth from the grave on Judgment Day.
