= Sonnet 111 =

« » Sonnet 111
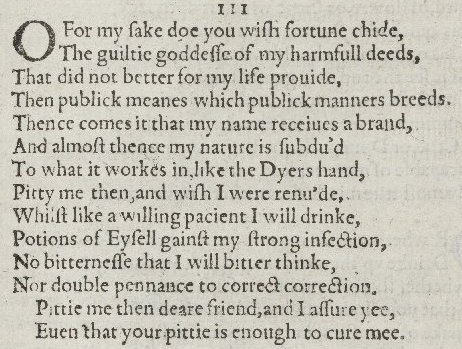
- Sonnet 111 in the 1609 Quarto
Q1
Q2
Q3
C
O, for my sake do you with Fortune chide,
The guilty goddess of my harmful deeds,
That did not better for my life provide
Than public means which public manners breeds.
Thence comes it that my name receives a brand,
And almost thence my nature is subdu’d
To what it works in, like the dyer’s hand:
Pity me then and wish I were renew’d;
Whilst, like a willing patient, I will drink
Potions of eisel ’gainst my strong infection;
No bitterness that I will bitter think,
Nor double penance, to correct correction.
Pity me then, dear friend, and I assure ye
Even that your pity is enough to cure me.
—William Shakespeare
4
8
12
14

Sonnet 111 is one of 154 sonnets written by the English playwright and poet William Shakespeare. It is a member of the Fair Youth sequence, in which the poet expresses his love towards a young man.

== Synopsis ==
The youth chides the goddess of fortune for providing for the poet nothing better than the public's / common people's applause. For this success the poet has to make his living in the public sphere, what is a shame. In doing so he is degraded, and almost finds himself sullied like a professional dyer stained with his dyes. He asks the youth to hope the poet will be regenerated after taking cleansing medicine against his infection. No medicine will be too bitter, but the youth's pity will be the most effective cure.

== Structure ==
Sonnet 111 is an English or Shakespearean sonnet. The English sonnet has three quatrains, followed by a final rhyming couplet. It follows the typical rhyme scheme of the form ABAB CDCD EFEF GG and is composed in iambic pentameter, a type of poetic metre based on five pairs of metrically weak/strong syllabic positions. The 4th line exemplifies a regular iambic pentameter:

  ×   /  ×   /      ×    /  ×   /  ×     / 
Than public means which public manners breeds. (111.4)

Line 10 has two common metrical variations, an initial reversal and a final extrametrical syllable or feminine ending:

 /  ×   ×  /  ×     /      ×    /   ×  /  (×) 
Potions of eisell 'gainst my strong infection; (111.10)

/ = ictus, a metrically strong syllabic position. × = nonictus. (×) = extrametrical syllable.

Lines 12, 13, and 14 also have feminine endings. Lines 8, 13, and 14 also have initial reversals, and they potentially occur in lines 1, 3, and 9.

The meter demands that line 14's "even" function as one syllable.
