= One's Self I Sing =

Poem by Walt Whitman

“One’s Self I Sing” is a poem by Walt Whitman, published in 1867 as the first poem for the final phase of Leaves of Grass.

== Poem ==
One’s-Self I sing, a simple, separate person;
Yet utter the word Democratic, the word en-Masse.

Of physiology from top to toe, I sing;
Not physiognomy alone, nor brain alone, is worthy for the Muse
I say the Form complete is worthier far;
The Female equally with the Male I sing.

Of Life immense in passion, pulse, and power,
Cheerful for freest action form’d, under the laws divine,
The Modern Man I sing.

== Analysis ==
Whitman celebrated the average American and altogether union and equality which differentiates it between stories of the time and of the past. Whitman speaks of individuality in the first lines. The combination of the “one” and the continuing of the “self” throughout the poem can be translated as, “everyman's self”. Whitman also speaks of freedom, identity, and all around brotherhood.

The theme changes in the three lines that follow when he references our spirit and physical body, our sexuality, male and female, and our wisdom. The final lines conclude with the idea of desire, physical and inner strength, and potential. Throughout the entire poem there is disagreement, such as, when the speaker says “simple” in the first line, “simple” meaning “not special,” and finishes the first line with “separate,” followed by the third line of "en-Masse", or togetherness. As the title is, “One’s Self,” not “Myself”, this already forms the bond between the reader and writer which again is what he is conveying in the poem. The final line has the reader caught up in the difference between past heroes and the “modern man” which is just as powerful if one believes that it is so.

Whitman’s writing could clarify an inner fight over his sexuality. Whitman wrote many pieces using the idea that he was the sophisticated teacher and the reader his accepting and willing student in which passion and desire transpire.

== Form ==
The first line is set in regular iambic pentameter, but the flow of the syllables in line two can be called “accentual or anapestic”. Critics noted Whitman’s form of triangular-shaped stanzas beginning with a short line followed by longer lines. Some have understood that starting the poem off with a short line invites the reader to expect “regular” poetry which is more relatable and understandable than Whitman's more experimental form.

Whitman’s third and final phase of Leaves of Grass was also known as the “inscriptions” section.
