= Sonnet 104 =

Poem by William Shakespeare

« » Sonnet 104
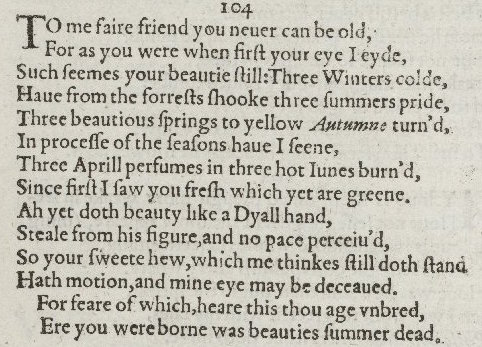
- Sonnet 104 in the 1609 Quarto
Q1
Q2
Q3
C
To me, fair friend, you never can be old,
For as you were when first your eye I ey’d,
Such seems your beauty still. Three winters cold
Have from the forests shook three summers’ pride,
Three beauteous springs to yellow autumn turn’d
In process of the seasons have I seen,
Three April perfumes in three hot Junes burn’d,
Since first I saw you fresh, which yet are green.
Ah! yet doth beauty, like a dial-hand,
Steal from his figure and no pace perceiv’d;
So your sweet hue, which methinks still doth stand,
Hath motion, and mine eye may be deceiv’d:
For fear of which, hear this, thou age unbred;
Ere you were born was beauty’s summer dead.
—William Shakespeare
4
8
12
14

Sonnet 104 is one of 154 sonnets written by the English playwright and poet William Shakespeare. It is a member of the Fair Youth sequence, in which the poet expresses his love towards a young man.

== Synopsis ==
The youth does not seem to have grown older at all in the three years that the poet has known him. Still, age comes on imperceptibly. If so, future ages will have to know that beauty died before future ages were born.

This sonnet deals with the destructive force of time as we grow older. The poet uses his friend as an example. He admires the fact that his friend has kept his youthful appearance over the time that he has known him.

== Structure ==
Sonnet 104 is an English or Shakespearean sonnet. The English sonnet has three quatrains, followed by a final rhyming couplet. It follows the typical rhyme scheme of the form ABAB CDCD EFEF GG and is composed in iambic pentameter, a type of poetic metre based on five pairs of metrically weak/strong syllabic positions. The 8th line exemplifies a regular iambic pentameter:

 ×     /    ×  /   ×    /      ×    /  ×     / 
Since first I saw you fresh, which yet are green. (104.8)

/ = ictus, a metrically strong syllabic position. × = nonictus.

The 13th line has a mid-line reversal ("hear this"):

 ×   /   ×    /     /     ×    ×  /   ×   / 
For fear of which, hear this thou age unbred: (104.13)

This is a metrical variation that is more commonly encountered at the beginning of the line, and there is one definite (line 10) and several potential (lines 3, 4, 9, 11, and 14) examples of initial reversals in the sonnet.

The meter demands a two-syllable pronunciation for "dial" in line 9.
