= Fabrikoid =

Brand of artificial leather

Fabrikoid, patented in October 1915, is a brand of artificial leather manufactured by DuPont.

== Material ==
Fabrikoid consists of cotton cloth coated with pyroxylin (a less nitrated nitrocellulose, dissolved in castor oil, alcohol, benzene and amyl acetate). Fabrikoid has been used for luggage, bookbinding, upholstery and dress trimmings.

== History ==
In 1910, DuPont purchased Newburgh, New York's Fabrikoid Company.

By the 1920s Fabrikoid was used heavily in both automobile seat covers and the tops of convertible automobiles.

Gilbert Rohde conducted some of the early experiments on its uses in upholstery.
