= Raleigh Was Right =

Poem by William Carlos Williams

"Raleigh Was Right" is a poem by William Carlos Williams, published in 1940 and composed in response to the Elizabethan exchange between Christopher Marlowe, in "The Passionate Shepherd to His Love", and Walter Raleigh, with "The Nymph's Reply".

Horton Foote's Roots in a Parched Ground, the opening play of The Orphans' Home Cycle, takes its title from a line in this poem.
