= Drop-dead =

Studio album by The Violet Burning
- Released: February 14, 2006
- Recorded: July 2005 @ Supernatural Sound
- Genre: Rock
- Length: 52:10
- Label: Northern Records
- Producer: Jeff Anderson

The Violet Burning chronology
This Is the Moment (2003)	Drop-dead (2006)	Mercy Songs (2010)

Drop-dead is the ninth full-length studio album of the band The Violet Burning. It was released February 14, 2006 on Northern Records.

== Track listing ==
All tracks by Michael J. Pritzl

1. "Human" – 5:17
2. "All I Want" – 4:02
3. "Do You Love Me?" – 3:26
4. "Already Gone" – 3:55
5. "More" – 5:40
6. "Swan Sea" – 3:50
7. "Eleanor" – 3:42
8. "Rewind" – 3:41
9. "Blown Away" – 4:10
10. "Trans" – 0:41
11. "The End Begins" – 7:00
12. "One Thousand Years" – 6:46

== Personnel ==
- Michael J. Pritzl - vocals
- Lenny Beh - drums
- Chris Buelow - guitar
- Daryl 'Black Cherry' Dawson - bass
