= Cameron McCasland =

American filmmaker (born 1981)

- Born: Robert Cameron McCasland; August 24, 1981; Dallas, Texas, US
- Years active: 1985–present
- Spouse(s): Jessica Evans, June 14, 2003 – July 2013 (2 children)
- Website: http://cameronmccasland.com/

Cameron McCasland (born August 24, 1981, in Dallas, Texas, US) is an American filmmaker.

== Career ==
In 2007 McCasland directed a video for Quiet Company's music video, Fashionable from the album Shine Honesty released by Northern Records. It is currently playing on demand at Mtv.ca after making the rounds on the festival circuit. It won best music video honors at the Crossroads Film Festival in Jackson, Mississippi, and Fearless Film Festival in Fort Worth, Texas, as well as taking the Silver Remi at the WorldFest Houston International Film Festival in Houston, Texas.

In 2008 McCasland was nominated for a Regional Emmy in advanced media writing for Trash Day of the Dead which he wrote and directed for the '"Go Green With Dr. Gangrene" campaign.

McCasland did a series of Go Green shorts, which garnered several national awards, and which received citations from Tennessee Governor Phil Bredesen, and the Nashville City Council. McCasland became the first recipient of the Vasaria Public Service Award at the Rondo Hatton Classic Horror Awards alongside Chiller Cinema.

McCasland has directed multiple episodes of Dr. Gangrene's Creature Feature which airs on Nashville's CW affiliate, WNAB. He has worked with Larry Underwood (who portrays Doctor Gangrene), as an actor on the show as well as appearing as himself on the half-hour show Chiller Cinema (the show changed titles when it moved to a two-hour format). He has provided movie reviews and articles to the show's website, which also won a Rondo Award at the Rondo Hatton Classic Horror Awards in 2005.

In 2009 McCasland directed the debut music video for the Numerics song Precious Time, which received the Golden Hermes award.

On April 19, 2014, McCasland debuted The Lashman at the Full Moon Horror Film Festival in Nashville, Tennessee. McCasland wrote, produced, and directed the film. The Lashman was nominated for Best Independent Film at the 13th annual Rondo Hatton Classic Horror Awards. It won a Matchflick Flicker Award for “Best Throwback Film of 2014”. McCasland won Indie Director Of The Year at the 2015 Individual TV Awards for the film. And in 2025, he was inducted into the Official Horror Host Hall of Fame in the category of "Behind the Screams".

== Personal life ==
While in Nashville he met Jessica Evans, whom he married in his hometown of Edgewood, Texas on Flag Day, June 14, 2003. Their daughter, Marie McCasland, was born in December 2004. Their second daughter Roxie McCasland was born only hours after McCasland returned home from the 2008 CMT Music Awards in April 2008. They separated in September 2011, and finalized their divorce in July 2013. On October 10, 2014, he married Jamie Easterwood.
