= They Sang as They Slew =

They Sang As They Slew, also known simply as TSATS, is an indie rock band from Toccoa, Georgia.

== History ==
Canary was a side project of Luxury's guitarist, Jamey Bozeman, and bassist, Chris Foley, during their hiatus from touring and recording. Canary released a full-length album, A Sound of Summer Running, a split EP called Scissors and Blue volume 4. During that time the members of Canary, Luxury, Viva Voce, and Menomena formed The Cut and Paste Collective which released 15+ albums under its umbrella including a compilation CD. Canary also appeared on the Audiolab Records tribute to the Prayer Chain called Salutations, covering the song "Antarctica" in the fall of 2002.

When Foley left Canary to attend St. Vladimir's Orthodox Seminary, Jordan Thomae (Locust Years) joined Jamey Bozeman (Luxury, The Barbie Stickers), Aaron Baber (Buzztown, John Doe Nation), and Doug Andrews (Fae Rae, Mantastic) to form They Sang As They Slew.

TSATS signed a 2-album deal with Northern Records and released their first full-length album Get Well in the fall of 2004. In December 2004, American webzine Somewhere Cold ranked Get Well No. 10 on their 2004 Somewhere Cold Awards Hall of Fame list.

In March 2008, TSATS released The Resistance, also on Northern Records.
