= Shine Honesty =

Studio album by Quiet Company
- Released: March 20, 2006
- Recorded: May 2005 Alex's Bedroom December 2005 Northern Records
- Genre: Indie rock
- Length: 50:53
- Label: Northern Records
- Producer: Quiet Company

Professional ratings
Review scores
Source	Rating
High Voltage Magazine	link

Shine Honesty is the first studio album by the band Quiet Company released on March 20, 2006, by Northern Records of Los Angeles California. The album is a piano rock driven effort recorded in majority by frontman Taylor Muse.

The Dallas Observer wrote of Shine Honesty: "Quiet Company's somber and seductive piano-driven rock rekindles Harvest-era Neil Young, similar to Band of Horses. The Austin trio's debut record, Shine Honesty, does just that as front man Taylor Muse's spiritual convictions heighten the emotional intensity of his deeply personal lyricism."

== Track listing ==
1. "How Many Times Do You Want To Fall in Love?"
2. "Fashionabel"
3. "Well Behaved Women Rarely Make History"
4. "Tie Your Monster Down"
5. "...Then Came A Sudden Validation"
6. "I Was Humming A New Song To Myself"
7. "The Emasculated Man and the City That Swallowed Him"
8. "Love Is A Shotgun"
9. "So Gracefully"
10. "Circumstance"
11. "We Change Lives"
12. "When You Pass Through The Waters"
13. "Untitled"

== Musicians ==
1. Taylor Muse – Music & Singing
2. Alex Bhore – all drums and percussion, and bass on "So Gracefully"
3. Nathan Petttijohn – Additional vocals on "Humming" & "Monster"
4. Johnny Musselman – Additional Piano on "Circumstance"
5. Andrew D. Prickett – Additional guitar on "Monster"

== Writers and arrangers ==
1. Taylor Muse – All Songs
2. Leah King – Lyrics by Leah King
3. Taylor Muse, Kevin Shultz, Chris Hoyt, Shane Renfro, & Nick Davis arranged tracks 3,4,6,10, & 12

== Cover art ==
1. Jamie Bozeman for low cost/high yield

== Music videos from album ==
1. "Fashionabel" – Directed by Cameron McCasland
