= Honey (band) =

American band

- Origin: Chicago, Illinois
- Genres: Christian rock, ambient rock, alternative rock, pop rock
- Years active: 1995 – 2001
- Labels: Sub•Lime Records, Northern Records
- Past members: Doug Moss, Billy Wan, Roger Moss, Paul Lagestee, Bill Dow

Honey was a Christian, ambient rock band composed of Doug Moss, Paul Lagestee, Billy Wan, and Roger Moss. The band recorded three albums between 1997 and 2001. The first two, Lovely and Lost on You, were released on the now-defunct Sub•Lime Records. Their third album, aptly titled Three, was released by Northern Records.

The first effort was produced by Christian alt/rock legend Steve Hindalong and was characterised by a rough, guitar-driven sound. For their second effort, production credits were diverse but significant with Jars of Clay's Dan Haseltine and Stephen Mason lending a hand as well as The Prayer Chain alumni Eric Campuzano and Wayne Everett. The result was a more approachable sound that was at once extraordinarily mellow and enormously engaging. As a departure from their first album, the work could be described as a "concept worship album". Indeed, many songs read as abstract praises of God. With their third album, Honey made a strong musical departure, moving to an up-tempo, alt/pop flavour. Thematically, the focus moved from theology to what could be described as "a soundtrack to a wistful, longing, romantic love life".

The band disbanded soon after the release of Three.

== Discography ==
- Lovely, 1997
- Lost on You, 1998
- Three, 2001
