= The Nymph's Reply to the Shepherd =

Poem by Walter Raleigh

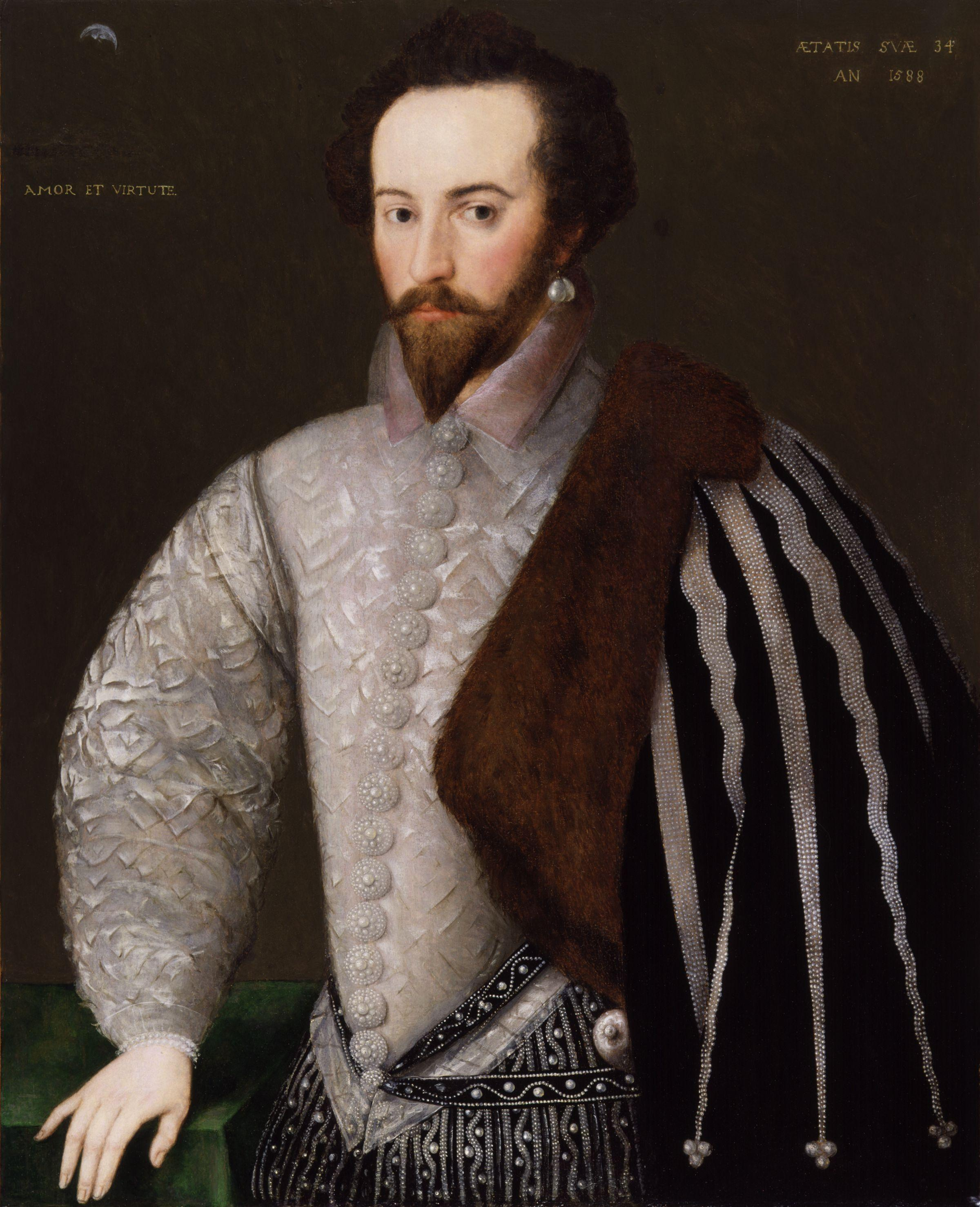
The Elizabethan-era poet Walter Raleigh in the year 1588.

In English literature, "The Nymph's Reply to the Shepherd" (1600), by Walter Raleigh, is a poem that responds to and parodies the poem "The Passionate Shepherd to His Love" (1599), by Christopher Marlowe. In reply to the shepherd's courtship, the nymph presents a point-by-point rejection of his offer of a transitory life of passion and pastoral idyll.

Stylistically, the poems by Marlowe and Raleigh are pastoral poetry written in six quatrains that employ a rhyme scheme of AABB CCDD EEFF GGHH IIBB JJBB. Compositionally, each poem follows the unstressed and stressed pattern of iambic tetrameter, using two couplets per stanza, with each line containing four iambs. The poem contains a number of rhetorical devices such as metaphors and alliterations.

Historically, in the composition of English poetry, the nymph is a character from Greek mythology who represents Nature and the finite spans of life, youth, and love, which the nymph explains to the shepherd. As a reply poem, "The Nymph's Reply to the Shepherd" is written as a first-person narrative; in the first stanza, the nymph tells the shepherd that if the world were perfect, she would live with him and be his love, but in the second stanza she reminds him that the good things in life, such as a bouquet of flowers, are impermanent. In Marlowe's poem, "The Passionate Shepherd to His Love", the flowers proffered by the shepherd represent youth, however, they also connote death, as the nymph notes in Raleigh's poem.

Moreover, as a poem from the Elizabethan era (1558–1603) of the 16th century, "The Nymph's Reply to the Shepherd" was not the only poetical reply to the poem by Kit Marlowe; in the 20th century, the poem Raleigh was Right (1940), by William Carlos Williams, sided with Walter Raleigh against Christopher Marlowe.

== The poem ==
The Nymph's Reply to the Shepherd (1600)

by Walter Raleigh (1552–1618)

If all the world and love were young,
And truth in every shepherd's tongue,
These pretty pleasures might me move
To live with thee and be thy love.

Time drives the flocks from field to fold
When Rivers rage and Rocks grow cold,
And Philomel becometh dumb;
The rest complains of cares to come.

The flowers do fade, and wanton fields
To wayward winter reckoning yields;
A honey tongue, a heart of gall,
Is fancy's spring, but sorrow's fall.

Thy gowns, thy shoes, thy beds of roses,
Thy cap, thy kirtle, and thy posies
Soon break, soon wither, soon forgotten:
In folly ripe, in reason rotten.

Thy belt of straw and Ivy buds,
Thy coral clasps and amber studs,
All these in me no means can move
To come to thee and be thy love.

But could youth last and love still breed,
Had joys no date nor age no need,
Then these delights my mind might move
To live with thee and be thy love.

== Authorship ==
The poem's attribution to Raleigh rests on two seventeenth-century manuscripts, whereas earlier copies are unattributed. Izaak Walton's inclusion of the poem in his The Compleat Angler (1653) is the earliest dateable reference to it being Raleigh's. With no other author identified in alternative manuscript copies, Victorian academic John Hannah concluded that "I should be sorry to believe that Walton was mistaken".

== Popular culture ==
In the film The Private Lives of Elizabeth and Essex (1939), the use of the poems communicates the sexual tension between the protagonists; the pivotal action of the romantic drama. For the Queen, Mistress Margaret Radcliffe (Nanette Fabray) offers to sing Marlowe's propositions in "The Passionate Shepherd to His Love", whilst Lady Penelope Gray (Olivia de Havilland), who is in love with the Earl of Essex, sings Raleigh's rebuttal, "The Nymph's Reply to the Shepherd", despite the protests of the frightened ladies in waiting also listening to the poetical recitation. Their performance of the poetry evokes Elizabeth I of England's fear that her love with Robert Devereux, 2nd Earl of Essex (Errol Flynn) is doomed by the thirty-two-year difference in their ages.

In the course of the recital, Queen Elizabeth (Bette Davis) is angered by each verse until her anger bursts aloud, and she hurls objects at the mirrors and demands that every mirror be removed from the palace. The terrified women flee with the wrecked mirrors, leaving Elizabeth alone with Margaret, who gently weeps in a corner of the room. The tenderness between Elizabeth and Margaret includes a speech about the meaning of noblesse oblige and promises to send for Margaret's beloved from Ireland, where he is fighting against the Earl of Tyrone. In the event, Margaret's love already is dead at war, and jealous Penelope joins a plot to block correspondence between Queen Elizabeth and the Earl of Essex. The missed communication between the two irreparably damages their trust in each other. Moreover, in the stageplay Elizabeth the Queen (1930), by Maxwell Anderson, neither Raleigh's nor Marlowe's poem, which both greatly feature in the cinematic "The Private Lives of Elizabeth and Essex", is used.
