= The Lie (poem) =

1592 poem by Sir Walter Raleigh

"The Lie" is a political and social criticism poem probably written by Sir Walter Raleigh circa 1592. Speaking in the imperative mood throughout, he commands his soul to go "upon a thankless errand" and tell various people and organizations of their misdeeds and wrongdoings. And if they object, Raleigh commands, publicly accuse them to be lying, or "give them the lie". To "give the lie" was a common phrase in Raleigh's time of writing.

== Synopsis ==
The poem is written in 13 stanzas in an ABABCC rhyme scheme. Raleigh begins with an energetic determination to expose the truth, especially in the socially elite, although he knows his doing so will not be well received.

Go, Soul, the body's guest,
Upon a thankless errand;
Fear not to touch the best;
The truth shall be thy warrant:

From there the poem moves quickly through a variety of scenes and situations of falsehood and corruption, all of which Raleigh condemns. The second and third stanzas accuse the court of being arrogant and yet wholly rotten, the church of being inactive and apathetic despite its teachings, and those in government of favoritism and greed, respecting only those in large numbers.

== History and authorship ==
Scholars are not certain that Raleigh is the true author of the poem, which was published after Raleigh's death. Written replies to the poem indicated that some of Raleigh's contemporaries believed he was its author. Pierre Lefranc denied Raleigh's authorship of the poem on thematic and stylistic grounds, arguing that replies to it deliberately incriminated him "as the author of someone else's nihilistic, irreverent, anti-establishment satire". Lefranc advanced clergyman Richard Latewar as the poem's author but Michael Rudick has argued that this ascription is incompatible with the poem's puritan elements, since Latewar had "High Church sympathies". Rudick concludes that although it is impossible to say for certain that Raleigh was its author, the most cogent hypotheses are that either he wrote it and was attacked for having done so, or somebody else wrote it and members of the Essex circle "fathered it on [Raleigh] to inflate his reputation for nihilism, atheism, respectlessness, and so on". This is one of Raleigh's most anthologized poems.
