= The Violet Burning =

American Christian alternative rock band

- Origin: Orange County, California
- Genres: Christian rock, alternative rock
- Years active: 1989–present
- Labels: New Breed, Bluestone, Domo, Northern
- Members: Michael J. Pritzl; Lenny Beh; Daryl Dawson; Chris Buelow; Kevin Buhler
- Website: thevioletburning.com

The Violet Burning is an independent American Christian alternative rock band based in Boston, Massachusetts. The band was formed in 1989 in Orange County, California by Michael J. Pritzl.

The band is the project of singer, songwriter and guitarist Michael J. Pritzl. Their first album was released by Vineyard Music with subsequent recording release on independent labels such as New Breed, Domo Records, Ruby Electric, Northern Records and directly to fans. They have toured North America and Europe multiple times and sold over 100,000 albums.

== History ==
HM ranked the band's 1992 album, Strength, at No. 69 on its Top 100 Christian Rock Albums of All Time list, in 2010.

The band toured Europe in mid-2011 and North America during October 2011.

== Discography ==
=== Full-length albums and EPs ===
- Chosen – (1989, New Breed/Vineyard Music Group/Frontline Records)
- Strength – (1992, Bluestone Records)
- The Violet Burning – (1996, Domo Records)
- Demonstrates Plastic and Elastic – (1998, Ruby Electric; review: HM Magazine)
- I Am a Stranger in This Place - An Experiment in Vibe – (2000, Sovereign Productions)
- Faith and Devotions of a Satellite Heart – (2000, Sovereign Productions)
- Fabulous Like You (as The Gravity Show) – (2002, Northern Records)
- This Is the Moment – (2003, Northern Records)
- Hollow Songs (as Michael Pritzl) – (2004, Northern Records) [EP]
- Drop-dead – (2006, Northern Records)
- Mercy Songs (as Michael Pritzl) – (2010, independent) [EP]
- The Story of Our Lives: TH3 FANTA5T1C MACH1N3 / Black as Death / Liebe über Alles – (2011, independent) [three-disc boxed set]
- The Story of Our Lives: Pentimento I and The Story of Our Lives: Pentimento II – (2012, independent)

=== Demos ===
- Dead Men Can't Swim, Heart Wide Open – (1989, independent) [cassette-only]
- You Wouldn't Understand Anyways ... – (1994, independent) [cassette-only; re-released on CD with Lillian Gish with hand-painted cover]
- Lillian Gish – (1995, independent) [cassette-only; re-released on CD with You Wouldn't Understand Anyways ... with hand-painted cover]
- Pomegranate – (2007, independent) [The Violet Burning-era demos and singles]
- Stars Go Down... When We Were Future Stars – (2007, independent) [expanded re-release of 1989's Dead Men Can't Swim, Heart Wide Open]

=== Live ===
- The Violet Underground Vol. 1: We Are Electric: Live Bootleg, Cornerstone 2000 – (2001, independent)
- The Violet Underground Vol. 2: Kissing the Sky: Live in the Netherlands and on Radio 3 (as Michael Pritzl, recorded in 1993) – (2001, independent)
- The Violet Burning Live: The Loudest Sound in My Heart – (2005, independent)
- Sting Like Bees and Sing – (2009, independent) [live at Cornerstone 2007]
- Beneath a Blinding Light – (2011, independent)
- The Vault 1: Live in Kansas City, December 2006 (as Michael Pritzl) – (2013, independent) [hand-painted cover]

=== Miscellaneous ===
- "Low" – (1993, Third Wave: The Reality Rock Collection, ERG-Essential) [original version]
- "Low" [single version] / "Low" [long version] – (1996, CD single, Domo)
- "It's All Too Much" (Beatles cover) – (1998, The Mother of All Tribute Albums, HM Records)
- "All Right" / "Elaste" – (2001, A Live Tribute Recording for Gene Eugene, Northern Records)
- The Violet Underground Vol. 3: Lipstick and Dynamite Wonder – (2002, independent) [re-release of 1996's The Violet Burning]
- The Violet Underground Vol. 4: Distortion Is Our Friend – (2002, independent) [includes demos from You Wouldn't Understand Anyways ... and Lillian Gish]
- "Sky High" (The Prayer Chain cover) – (2002, Salutations: A Tribute to the Prayer Chain, Audiolab)
- The Violet Underground Vol. 5: Violet Christmas Vol. 1 – (2003, independent)
- Gravity – (2007, independent) [alternate mixes and demos by The Violet Burning, Michael Pritzl, and The Gravity Show]
- Divine: 10 Songs for Christmas – (2008, digital-only Christmas album, independent)
- FACT0RY CRASH M 1X 1 preview – (2010, digital-only release, independent)
- Divine 2.0 – (2012, independent) [expanded and remastered version of 2008's Divine - limited edition of 150 copies with hand-painted cover]
- Divine 3.0 – (2013, independent) [remastered version of 2008's Divine with bonus tracks - limited edition with hand-painted cover]
- "Mon Désir (All I Want Is You)" (edit) – (2013, Music Love Action: A Benefit for the Philippines - Presented by Soulfest, NoiseTrade)

=== Collaborations of Michael Pritzl ===
- Touching the Father's Heart #7: Hear Our Cry (Psalm 102) (with others) – (1990, Vineyard Ministries, International)
- Touching the Father's Heart #12: Throne of Grace (with others) – (1991, Vineyard Ministries, International)

== Videos ==
- Film Show (VHS)
- Live footage from Cornerstone Festival 2000 and Tom Festival 2000
- 13 live tracks filmed throughout America and Europe of during 2003-2005 touring
- The Loudest Sound in My Heart (DVD, 2005)
- Shelter Me Beneath a Blinding Light (digital-only release, 2011)

== Members ==
- Michael J. Pritzl

Current players (in addition to Pritzl)

- Lenny Beh – drums, violin
- Chris Buelow – guitar
- Daryl "Black Cherry" Dawson – bass, guitar
- Kevin Buhler – guitar, bass
- Paul Stebner – guitar

Musicians who have toured or recorded with The Violet Burning

- Michael Misiuk – guitar
- Kirt Gentry – bass guitar
- Lonnie Tubbs – drums
- Scott Tubbs – bass guitar
- Shawn Tubbs – guitar
- Andrew Prickett – guitar
- Jeff Schroeder – guitar
- Jason Pickersgill – bass guitar
- Herb Grimaud Jr. – bass guitar
- Michael Kalmar – drums
- Glen Pearce – guitar
- Robbie Farr – guitar
- David Archuletta II – guitar
- Eddie Fisher – drums
- James Banuelos – percussion
- Melissa Barnett – backing vocals
- Jamie Record (Eichler) – backing vocals
- Daniel Dupuis – drums
- Gabriel Wilson – guitar, effects
- Sam West – drums
- Douglas Heckman – guitar
- Chris Buelow – guitar
- Kevin Buhler – guitar, bass guitar
- Jason Lord Mize – drums
- Larry Salzman – drums
- Ben Pasketti – guitar
- Joel Zwanziger – drums
- Josiah Sherman – synth, piano
- Susan Costantini Green – piano, synth
- Gabriel Wilson – drums, backing vocals
- Chris Greely – backing vocals
- Matt Payne – drums
- Eleanor Beh – cello
- Danny Ponce – drums
- Charles Maynes - synths
