= Monarch (American band) =

American electro-pop band

- Origin: Los Angeles, California
- Genres: Post pop, indie pop
- Years active: 2002–present
- Members: Brent Kutzle; Brennan Strawn; Brian Willet; Joel Plotnik

Monarch is an American indie electro-pop band based in Los Angeles, California. The members of the band are Brennan Strawn, Brent Kutzle, Brian Willett and Joel Plotnik.

The band have released their debut single "Stay" on March 28, 2015, and are set to announce the Apollo EP this spring as well as reveal live dates.

== History ==
Originally from Pittsburgh, Pennsylvania, Monarch signed to Northern Records of Orange County where they released "The Grandeur that was Rome" in 2003 and "lowly" in 2007. The band later dissolved and reformed under the direction of Brennan in Seattle with the addition of Brent Kutzle of OneRepublic and other new members. The inception of Monarch began out of a love of vast soundscapes and soundtracks from movies of the 80s and 90s.

On March 28, Monarch released their debut single "Stay" on SoundCloud. On April 2, 2015, they announced they will be releasing a new single entitled "Snow White". The video for the single was filmed on April 4.

== Musical style ==
Band's music has been dubbed "melodic-driven indie pop", Monarch is often compared to bands like Elbow, Sigur Ros, Keane, and Denali. Monarch's songs are inspired by an independent approach to a melodic pop sound, including elements of urban grooves and hints of cinematic themes. Strawn adds, "We usually start with a key line, mumble in a few melodies and let our imaginations get the best of us." Lead vocalist has also explained that the band is still in development of their sound, but their love for half time, heavy synth bass and big melodies will never change.

== Band members ==
Current Members

- Brennan Strawn – vocals (2002–present)
- Brent Kutzle – keyboards, bass guitar, cello (2010–present)
- Brian Willet – keyboards (2010–present)
- Joel Plotnik – drums (2010–present)
