= Quiet Company =

- Origin: Austin, Texas, United States
- Genres: Indie pop, indie rock
- Years active: 2000–present
- Labels: Modern Outsider, Velvet Blue, Northern
- Members: Taylor Muse; Thomas Blank; Tomas Garcia-Olano; Bill Gryta; Drew Silverman; Niamh Fahy; Justin Washington
- Past members: Matt Parmenter; Jeff Weathers; Cody Ackors; Alex Bhore; Jesse Garcia; Tim Robbins; Michael Delaney; Trevor Wiggins; Evan Smoker; Drew d'Entremont; Justin Huling; Jeff Stringer; Trevor Dowdy
- Website: quietcompanymusic.com

Quiet Company is an American rock band from Austin, Texas, fronted by Taylor Muse. They have released five albums, which includes a re-release of their debut album Shine Honesty, multiple EPs, a live DVD, and Christmas-themed offerings. They were the first band signed by Grooveshark, which folded in 2015, as part of their Artist Development Program. Their latest album, Transgressor, was released February 24, 2015.

== History ==
=== 2000 - 2008: Formation and early success ===
Muse started his musical aspirations as part of the East Texas indie music boom with his participation in several projects at the time, which included Uncle Andrew, Neckpunch, The Lonely Hearts and a short stint as bass fill-in for Eisley. A key contributor in the songwriting process for Eisley's debut album for Warner Bros. Records, Muse also gave the band a new name that, if only in part, would stick, MossEisley.

After an unsuccessful year with the Connotations in Nashville, Muse returned to Austin to begin writing and recording what would become the band's first album Shine Honesty under the name Quiet Company. The record was quickly picked up for online distribution by the boutique Christian label Northern Records. Recording Shine Honesty mostly by himself, Muse was in need of band mates to play live shows, providing the pretext for Quiet Company's first permanent addition, Tommy Blank, via a Craigslist ad, in 2005. The band embarked on a number of small national tours in the subsequent the years. Shortly after, the band left their label in order to exert more self control over their content.

The band's next offerings were decidedly more festive, with 2007 bringing a recording of "Have Yourself a Merry Little Christmas" as part of Peace on Earth: A Holiday Album, in which proceeds from sales went to the Toys for Tots charity, as well as their own release A Merry Little Christmas EP.

=== 2009 - Present: New additions and continued success ===
In 2009, the band recorded and self-released their second album, Everyone You Love Will Be Happy Soon, with local producers Charlie Vela and Louie Lino of Nada Surf fame, and mixed by Tim Palmer, who had worked previously with U2 and Pearl Jam. Following the release, Jeff Weathers (drums) and Matthew Parmenter (bass guitar) joined the group as permanent members, with Parmenter's addition to the group the result of another Craigslist ad. While filming their music video for the single, "On Modern Men", the band added their fifth member, Cody Ackors on trombone.

In 2010, Quiet Company released Songs for Staying In, a 6-song EP, produced by Quiet Company and recorded by bass player Matt Parmenter in his apartment studio, Ice Cream Factory Studios.

Continuing to be recognized, 2011 began with the band being nominated for the 10th Annual Independent Music Awards under the Pop/Rock Song category for "It's Better To Spend Money Like There's No Tomorrow Than Spend Tonight Like There's No Money". By mid-2011, Quiet Company joined forces via an Artist Development deal with the former music-streaming service Grooveshark. The band's partnership with the service helped to encourage a global audience by increasing exposure on platforms like Facebook and increasing overall listenership on the steaming site, making the band's offerings available to a wider audience.

The band spent most of 2011 promoting their new album We Are All Where We Belong around Texas, in addition to scoring slots at CMJ and DeLuna Festival. Songs from the new album have peaked on popular blog-aggregator websites such as Hype Machine and We Are Hunted (#49 Most Hyped and #5 on Rock Charts, respectively), in addition to receiving attention on websites such as NPR and the TV show Last Call with Carson Daly.

In a dominant showing, Quiet Company and its members won a total of ten awards at the Austin Chronicle's 30th Annual Austin Music Awards in 2012, including Best Band and Album of the Year, with Muse receiving Musician of the Year honors.

Returning to the studio in 2014, Quiet Company recorded its fifth album Transgressor at Orb Recording Studio in Austin, with producer Matt Noveskey. The album was released February 24, 2015 on Modern Outsider Records.

2016 proved to be a year of transitions for the group – with existing members exiting the group and new ones taking their places. The following years have proceeded with three EPs with themes centering around Muse's divorce from his wife, which took place after the release of Transgressor.

=== Religious influences, criticism ===
Though Muse's Quiet Company was initially signed to a Christian label Northern Records, played the Christian rock oriented Cornerstone Festival and Muse himself repeatedly drawing heavy religious comparisons in his lyrics, he has stated that he is no longer a Christian and has posited that Quiet Company has never been a Christian band: "I've always fallen back on religious imagery as a songwriting tool, just because it was familiar to me and I liked the aesthetic of it," says Muse in a recent interview with the Austin Chronicle.

Early efforts by the band include heavy use of Christian themes and iconography, but have shifted over time, with the meaning behind the metaphor's usage evoking something much different than it did previously for the band. Speaking specifically about the 2011 release We Are All Where We Belong, Muse states, "It's easily the most personal thing I've ever written. It is, essentially, a break up record, only the romance that's ending was between myself and religion."

The album left most of the band's pre-existing Christian fan base confused. Muse says he receives e-mails frequently from fans who "love the record" but are "concerned" about his departure from religion.

=== Exposure and touring ===
Quiet Company's music has been and continues to be featured by various Austin rock-oriented radio stations such as KUTX, KSGR, KROX, KUT, KOOP and KLBJ.

Expanding exposure outside the local scene, a sampling of the band's songs have been used in television shows such as E!'s Keeping Up With the Kardashians, MTV's The Real World: New Orleans, The CW's Hart of Dixie, ABC's My Generation, USA's Royal Pains and in The Sims 3: Showtime expansion pack for The Sims 3.

Quiet Company has done several national tours but plays predominantly in and around their home state, Texas. They have played with many notable acts, such as Blue October, Rooney, Stoney, Ghostland Observatory, What Made Milwaukee Famous, Deadbeat Darling, Alpha Rev, The Rocketboys, Dear and the Headlights, Third Eye Blind, Dashboard Confessional, Cheap Trick, Eisley, Evan Dando, Bob Schneider, Old 97's and The Toadies.

== Members ==
=== Current members ===
- Taylor Muse - vocals, guitars, piano/keyboard, extraneous percussion, songwriter
- Tommy Blank - guitars, keyboard, accordion, melodica, backing vocals
- Tomas Garcia-Olano - bass guitar, backing vocals
- Drew Silverman - drums
- Justin Washington - trumpet, percussion, backing vocals
- Niamh Fahy - violin, strings, backing vocals
- Bill Gryta - guitars, baritone guitar, keyboard, synthesizers, backing vocals

Other contributors:

- Betsy Aune - vocals, and wife of Thomas Blank
- Paul Osbon - vocals, and manager

=== Former members ===
- Jesse Garcia (drums)
- Tim Robbins (drums)
- Michael Delaney (drums)
- Jeff Weathers (drums)
- Evan Smoker (drums)
- Drew d'Entremont (drums)
- Justin Huling (drums)
- Matthew Parmenter (bass)
- Cody Ackors (horns)
- Alex Bhore (drums, percussion, bass)
- Jeff Stringer (drums, percussion, backing vocals)
- Trevor Dowdy (bass, backing vocals)

== Discography ==
=== LPs ===
- Shine Honesty – March 7, 2006
- Everyone You Love Will Be Happy Soon – March 10, 2009
- We Are All Where We Belong – October 4, 2011
- A Dead Man On My Back: Shine Honesty Revisited – April 9, 2013
- Transgressor – February 24, 2015

=== EPs ===
- Songs for Staying In – May 11, 2010
- Winter Is Coming - November 29, 2012
- Other People's Hits: Vol 1 - May 6, 2014
- Regressor - October 21, 2016
- It's Not Attractive & It Changes Nothing - March 31, 2017
- Your Husband, The Ghost - August 18, 2017
- On Corners & Shapes – January 4, 2019
- Are You a Window? – June 19, 2020

=== Compilations ===
- Scene But Not Herd - Unsigned Band Compilation #3 – 2001
- Peace on Earth: A Holiday Album – 2007
- Music For The City, Vol. 1 - 2009

=== Videography ===
==== Music videos ====
- "Fashionabel" (2007) (directed By Cameron McCasland)
- "On Modern Men" (2010) (directed by Justin Kirchhoff)
- "Fear & Fallacy, Sitting In A Tree" (2011) (directed by Justin Kirchhoff)
- "You, Me, & the Boatman" (2011) (directed by Josh Sobel)
- "The Emasculated Man and the City That Swallowed Him" (2013) (directed by Justin Kirchhof and Tommy Blank)
- "Celebrity Teeth Poacher" (2017) (directed by Quiet Company and Alex Chod)

==== DVD ====
- Live from Studio 6A (2010)
