= Luxury (Georgia band) =

American musical group

Luxury is a rock band from Toccoa, Georgia. They began playing together as The Shroud at Toccoa Falls College in the early 1990s, and changed their name to Luxury just before signing with Tooth & Nail Records and releasing their debut album, Amazing And Thankyou.

Luxury toured extensively in the months following Amazing And Thankyou's release. In late 1995, a car accident between touring engagements resulted in most of the band's members being hospitalized. Luxury took a year-long hiatus before going back on tour to support their second album, The Latest & The Greatest, though with fewer dates than initially anticipated. After growing more and more unhappy with the continually waning resources and promotion provided them by Tooth & Nail, they opted (in 1997) not to renew their contract with the label, and instead released their third album, Luxury (1999), on Bulletproof Records. Soon after, Luxury broke up.

Jamey Bozeman started a new band called Canary, which soon became They Sang as They Slew, while Lee Bozeman recorded a solo project, Love & Affection, under the name All Things Bright and Beautiful. In 2005 Luxury reconvened in Toccoa to record Health And Sport, which was released on Northern Records.

In May 2008, Luxury became involved in a dispute with a Boston-based band using the name "Luxury", resulting in confusion relating to the latter's album sales on Amazon.com. Subsequently, the latter took on the name "The Luxury."

In 2015, they released their fifth full-length album Trophies which has been described by music reviewers as the band's best work. Luxury is currently releasing its records as an independent act.

In March 2019, Eleventyseven lead singer Matt Langston interviewed drummer Glenn Black on the Eleventylife podcast and discussed the music industry, as well as the film documentary about the band entitled Parallel Love: The Story of a Band Called Luxury, which had limited theatrical release in 2021 through Abramorama and is now available on streaming services.

In 2024, Luxury released their sixth full-length album Like Unto Lambs.

== Religious association ==
Luxury's record label Tooth & Nail Records originated in the independent Christian music scene. The members of Luxury all identify as Christian, though they largely eschewed the Christian music scene on principle.

Three of the five members (Foley, Bozeman, and Bozeman) are now Orthodox priests, serving in the Orthodox Church in America. In June 2025, Lee Bozeman (Fr. David) was appointed Secretary of the OCA.

== Band members ==
- D. E. Lee Bozeman - vocals, guitar
- Jamey Bozeman - guitar, background vocals
- Chris Foley - bass
- Glenn Black - drums
- Matt Hinton - guitar, banjo, mandolin

== Discography ==
- Tinsel (as the Shroud) (No Label 1992) [cassette only]
- Candy, Darling? (as the Shroud), Darling? (Rage Records 1993) [cassette only]
- Luxury ("Pink Tape") (No Label 1994) [cassette only]
- Split EP with Sunbrain (Ghostmeat Records 1994) [7-inch only)
- Amazing And Thankyou (Tooth & Nail Records 1995) [CD/cassette]
- Nude at Last (No Label 1996) [cassette only]
- The Latest & The Greatest (Tooth & Nail Records 1996) [CD/cassette]
- Luxury (Bulletproof 1999) [CD/cassette]
- Health And Sport (Northern Records 2005) [CD/mp3]
- Trophies (2019) [CD/vinyl/mp3]
- Like Unto Lambs (2024) [CD/vinyl/mp3]
