= Mercury (The Prayer Chain album) =

Studio album by The Prayer Chain
- Released: 11 April 1995
- Studio: Neverland (Nashville); The Green Room (Huntington Beach)
- Genre: Shoegaze; christian alternative rock
- Length: 56:53
- Label: Rode Dog Records
- Producer: Steve Hindalong

The Prayer Chain chronology
| Shawl (1993) | Mercury (1995) | Antarctica (1996) |

Mercury is the third studio album by American alternative rock band The Prayer Chain. It was recorded in 1994 and released on April 11, 1995, by Rode Dog Records, with manufacturing support from Reunion Records.

Mercury was an altered version of an original album that the band intended to release, but couldn't due to Reunion Records' dissatisfaction with its uncommercial sound. The original version, titled Humb, became available digitally on October 5, 2011.

== Background ==
The album marked a significant departure from the band's earlier, grunge-oriented style on their second album Shawl. Guitarist Andy Prickett and drummer Wayne Everett explained the change in musical direction as a desire to create something "emotional and moving – something that stirs the Spirit and the heart rather than the head," noting that the high energy of their past performances often led to audiences jumping on stage and injuring each other.

The album drew influences primarily from British acts such as the Verve, Curve, Peter Gabriel, and My Bloody Valentine, while the drums and percussion were inspired by African group the Drummers of Burundi and Pakistani musician Nusrat Fateh Ali Khan. Prickett described the band's stylistic approach on the album as "ancient rhythms and sounds" mixed with "modern noise-pop."

== Release ==
The initial release of Mercury was delayed for several months after Reunion Records expressed dissatisfaction with the album's original version and requested that the band re-record several tracks to make it more marketable. The Prayer Chain remixed the album, slightly reducing distortions and drone elements while retaining its signature wall of sound. A few songs were removed, and a new single, "Sky High," was written to satisfy the label's expectations.

Despite these changes, the album didn't receive widespread acceptance within the Christian music community, and the band was subsequently dropped. In 2011, the Prayer Chain digitally released the original unaltered version of the album, Humb, featuring a slightly different track listing.

== Reception ==
Cross Rhythms gave Mercury a positive review, calling it "a disturbing, at times almost avant guarde, album not for the weak hearted." AllMusic described the album as the Prayer Chain's "most expertly conceived record," noting its haunting exploration of numbness and human isolation.
