= Walter Raleigh =

English statesman and explorer (1552–1618)

Sir Walter Raleigh
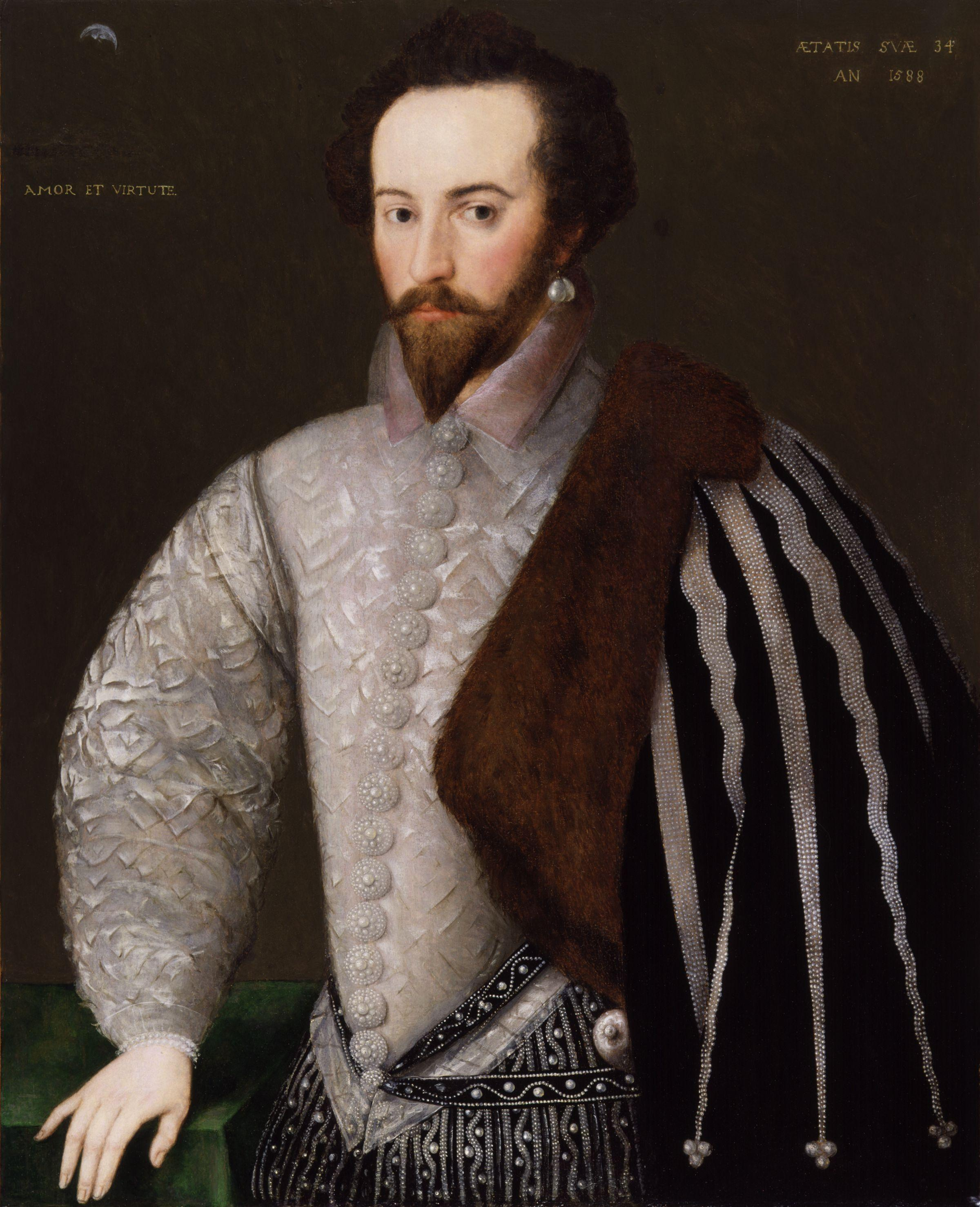
- Portrait of Raleigh, 1588

Government offices
- 1584–1603: Lord Warden of the Stannaries
- 1585–1603: Vice-Admiral of Devon
- 1587–1603: Lord Lieutenant of Cornwall
- 1586–1592 1597–1603: Captain of the Yeomen of the Guard
- 1598–1603: Custos Rotulorum of Dorset
- 1600–1603: Governor of Jersey

Parliamentary offices
- 1584–1585 1586–1587: Member of Parliament for Devonshire
- 1597–1598: Member of Parliament for Dorset
- 1601: Member of Parliament for Cornwall

Personal details
- Born: c. 1553 East Budleigh, Devon, England
- Died: 29 October 1618 (aged c. 65) London, England
- Cause of death: Execution by beheading
- Spouse: Elizabeth Throckmorton
- Children: Damerei; Walter "Wat"; Carew
- Education: Oriel College, Oxford

Military service
- Battles/wars: Second Desmond Rebellion; French Wars of Religion; Spanish Armada
- Writing career
- Notable works: The Lie; What is Our Life; The Discovery of Guiana; The Historie of the World; The Nymph's Reply to the Shepherd

Sir Walter Raleigh (Note: Many alternative spellings of his surname exist, including Rawley, Ralegh, Ralagh and Rawleigh. "Raleigh" appears most commonly today, but he is known to have used that spelling only once. His most consistent preference was for "Ralegh". His full name is /ˈwɔːltər ˈrɔːli/, but in practice, /ˈrɑːli/ RAH-lee and /ˈræli/ RAL-ee are the usual modern pronunciations in England.) (/ˈrɔːli, ˈrɑːli, ˈræli/; c. 1553 – 29 October 1618) was an English statesman, soldier, writer and explorer. One of the most notable figures of the Elizabethan era, he played a leading part in English colonisation of North America, suppressed rebellion in Ireland, helped defend England against the Spanish Armada and held political positions under Elizabeth I.

Raleigh was born to a landed gentry family of Protestant faith in Devon, the son of Walter Raleigh and Catherine Champernowne, daughter of Sir Philip Champernowne. He was the younger half-brother of Sir Humphrey Gilbert and a cousin of Sir Richard Grenville. Little is known of his early life, though in his late teens he spent some time in France taking part in the religious civil wars. In his 20s he took part in the suppression of rebellion in the colonisation of Ireland; he also participated in the siege of Smerwick. Later, he became a landlord of property in Ireland and mayor of Youghal in east Munster.

Raleigh rose rapidly in the favour of Queen Elizabeth I and was knighted in 1585. He was granted a royal patent to explore Virginia, paving the way for future English settlements. In 1591, he secretly married Elizabeth Throckmorton, one of the Queen's ladies-in-waiting, without the Queen's permission, for which he and his wife were sent to the Tower of London. After his release, they retired to his estate at Sherborne, Dorset.

In 1594, Raleigh heard of a "City of Gold" in South America and sailed to find it, publishing an exaggerated account of his experiences in a book that contributed to the legend of "El Dorado". After Queen Elizabeth died in 1603, Raleigh was again imprisoned in the Tower, this time for being involved in the Main Plot against King James I, who was not favourably disposed towards him. In 1616, he was released to lead a second expedition in search of El Dorado. During the expedition, men led by his top commander sacked a Spanish outpost, in violation of both the terms of his pardon and the 1604 peace treaty with Spain. Raleigh returned to England and, to appease the Spanish, he was arrested and executed in 1618.

== Early life ==
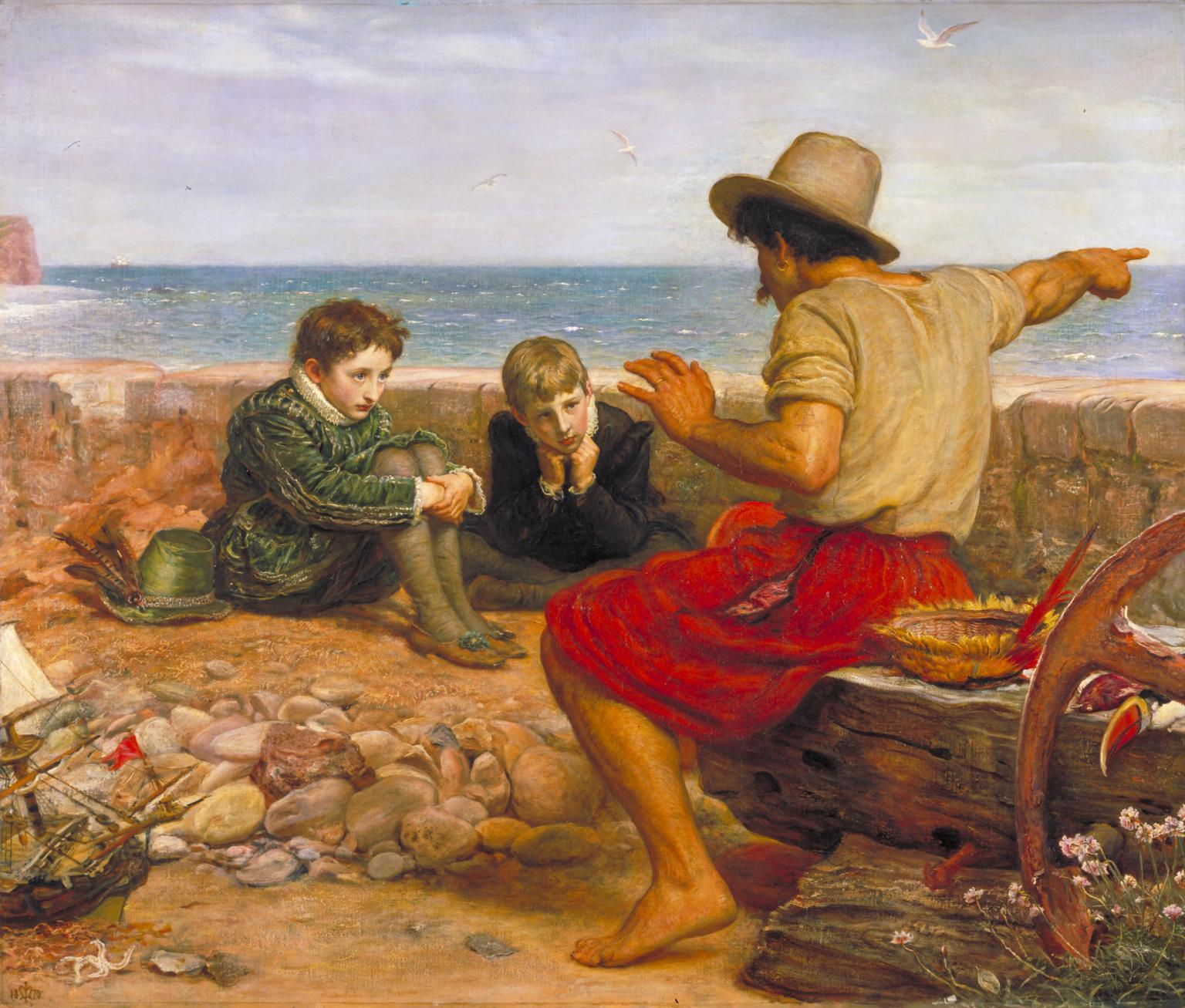
The Boyhood of Raleigh by John Everett Millais, 1871

Little is known about Sir Walter Raleigh's birth but he is believed to have been born on 22 January 1552 (or possibly 1554). He grew up in the house of Hayes Barton (in the parish of East Budleigh), in East Devon. He was the youngest of the five sons of Walter Raleigh (or Rawleigh) of Fardel Manor (in the parish of Cornwood), in South Devon. His mother was Katherine Champernowne, the third wife of Walter Raleigh senior. Raleigh's family is generally assumed to have been a junior branch of the Raleigh family, 11th-century lords of the manor of Raleigh, Pilton in North Devon, although the two branches are known to have borne entirely dissimilar coats of arms, (Note: Raleigh of Pilton: Gules crusilly or, a bend vair; arms of Raleigh of Fardell: Gules, five fusils conjoined in bend argent) adopted at the start of the age of heraldry (c. 1200–1215).

Arms of Katherine Champernowne, mother of Sir Walter Raleigh, impaled by the arms of her first husband, Otes Gilbert. Churston Ferrers Church

Walter Raleigh junior's immediate family included his full brother Carew Raleigh, and half-brothers John Gilbert, Humphrey Gilbert and Adrian Gilbert. As a consequence of their kinship with the Champernowne family, all of the Raleigh and Gilbert brothers became prominent during the reigns of Elizabeth I and James I.

Raleigh's family was highly Protestant in religious orientation and had a number of near escapes during the reign of Roman Catholic Queen Mary I of England. In the most notable of these, his father had to hide in a tower to avoid execution. As a result, Raleigh developed a hatred of Roman Catholicism during his childhood, and proved himself quick to express it after Protestant Queen Elizabeth I came to the throne in 1558. In matters of religion, Elizabeth was more moderate than her half-sister Mary.

In 1569, Raleigh went to France to serve with the Huguenots in the French religious civil wars. In 1572, Raleigh was registered as an undergraduate at Oriel College, Oxford, but he left in 1574 without a degree. Raleigh proceeded to finish his education in the Inns of Court. In 1575, he was admitted to the Middle Temple, having previously been a member of Lyon's Inn, one of the Inns of Chancery. At his trial in 1603, he stated that he had never studied law. Much of his life is uncertain between 1569 and 1575, but in his History of the World, he claimed to have been an eyewitness at the Battle of Moncontour (3 October 1569) in France. In 1575 or 1576, Raleigh returned to England.

In 1577 and again in 1579 Raleigh made voyages with his half-brother Sir Humphrey Gilbert in attempts to find a Northwest Passage. They failed to find a passage, but succeeded in raiding Spanish ships.

== Ireland ==
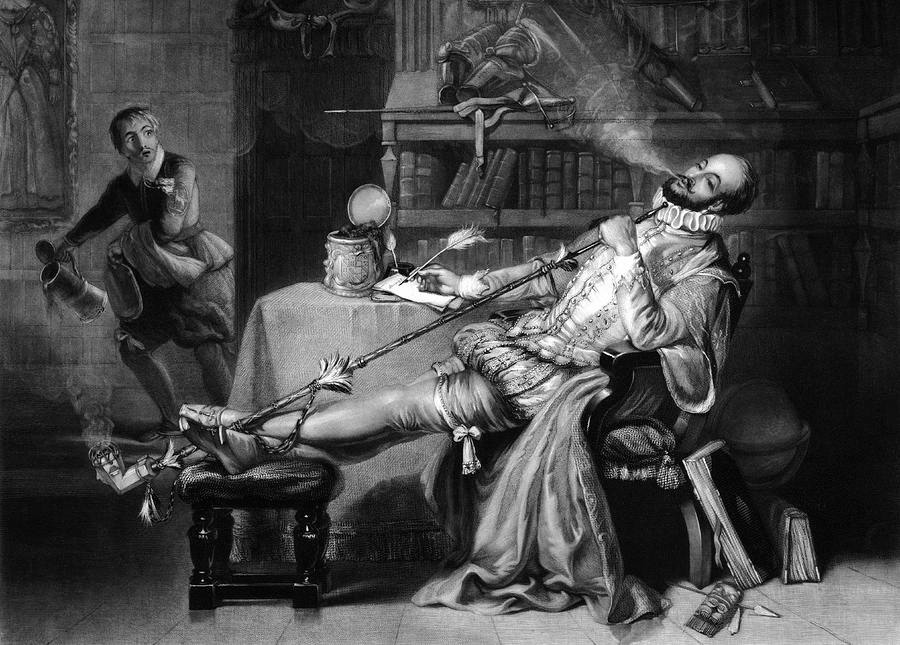
"Raleigh's First Pipe in England", an illustration included in Frederick William Fairholt's Tobacco, its history and associations

From 1579 to late 1580, Raleigh took part in the suppression of the Desmond Rebellions. He was present at the siege of Smerwick, where he led the party that beheaded some 600 Spanish and Italian soldiers who had surrendered. In September 1584, Queen Elizabeth I had the land surveyed to be divided amongst her "undertakers" (people she appointed to undertake supervision of colonization of the region) to colonize.

In 1585, Raleigh received 40,000 acres (16,000 ha) (approximately 0.2% of Ireland) in the Munster Plantation, including the coastal walled town of Youghal and, further up the Blackwater River, the village of Lismore.

The place most commonly associated with Raleigh in Ireland is the town of Youghal, County Cork. He was mayor of Youghal for one year (1588/1589) although his duties were fulfilled by a deputy suggesting absenteeism and it would appear Raleigh ran his various estates from London.

Raleigh encouraged veterans of the earlier attempts of the Roanoke Colony settle in Ireland, including Thomas Hariot and John White from the 1585 trip. (He was the governor of the 1587 Roanoke trip, but returned with the delivery ship to acquire additional supplies.) Raleigh is credited with introducing potatoes to England and Ireland, though others suggest a fellow Munster planter, Anthony Southwell (1579–1623), while others assert they arrived through the trade with Spain; they were known as An Spáinneach Geal (the bright Spaniard) before his time. A potato crop failure in the nineteenth century would lead to the Great Famine when they were the only crop not exported in bulk to Britain from 1840 to 1852, a time when potatoes across the continent were destroyed by a gigantic outbreak of blight known as the European potato failure.

Amongst Raleigh's acquaintances in Munster was another Englishman who had been granted land in the Irish colonies, poet Edmund Spenser. Raleigh's management of his Irish estates ran into difficulties which contributed to a decline in his fortunes. In 1602, he sold the lands to Richard Boyle, 1st Earl of Cork, who subsequently prospered under kings James I and Charles I.

== New World ==
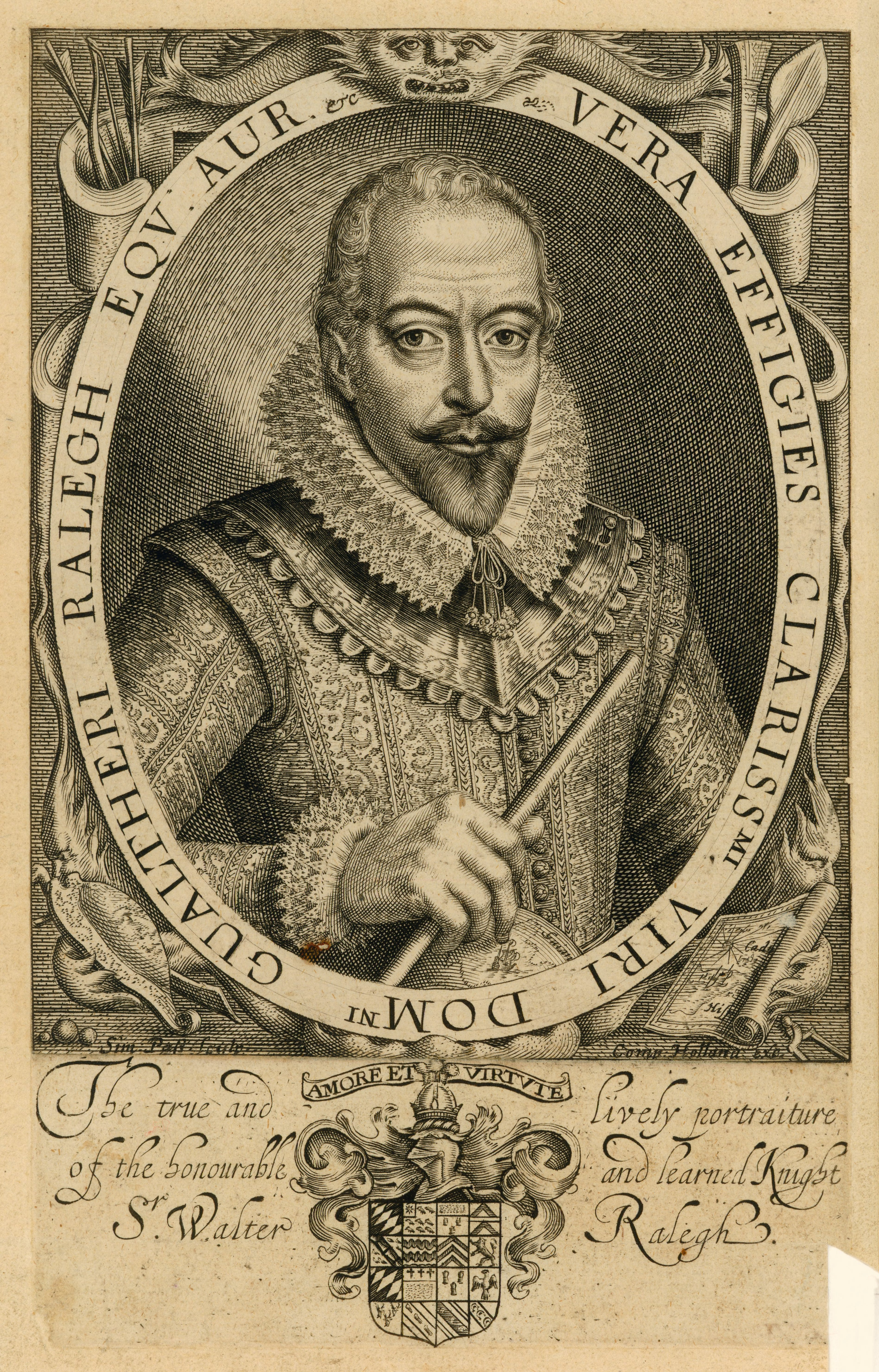
Engraved portrait of Raleigh

On 25 March 1584 Queen Elizabeth granted Raleigh a royal charter authorising him to explore, colonise and rule any "remote, heathen and barbarous lands, countries and territories, not actually possessed of any Christian Prince or inhabited by Christian People", in return for one-fifth of all the gold and silver that might be mined there. This charter specified that Raleigh had seven years in which to establish a settlement, or else lose his right to do so. Raleigh and Elizabeth intended that the venture should provide riches from the New World and a base from which to send privateers on raids against the treasure fleets of Spain. The charter was originally given to Sir Humphrey Gilbert who pitched the idea to Queen Elizabeth I and died at sea while attempting to accomplish it.

On 27 April 1584, the Philip Amadas and Arthur Barlowe expedition set sail from England on an exploratory mission to determine what resources were available in North America. They returned with two of the local inhabitants, Manteo and Wanchese, in August 1584, and reported of their findings. The region (the majority of the east coast) received the name "Virginia" for the Virgin Queen Elizabeth I, which is the origin of the name of the modern-day state.

In 1585 he sent a militarized group to North America to set up a fort to raid Spanish ships and become the first English colony in North America. The voyage was led by Sir Richard Grenville and the colony on Roanoke Island was governed by Ralph Lane. The colony ran out of food after clashes with the local inhabitants and eventually left with Sir Francis Drake in June 1586 after resupply attempts failed. Sir Richard Grenvile arrived shortly after the Lane colony left with Drake. He left supplies and 15 men on Roanoke Island and returned to England. They were never seen again.

On 22 July 1587 Raleigh attempted a second expedition, again establishing a settlement on Roanoke Island. This time, a more diverse group of settlers was sent, including some entire families, under the governance of John White. After a short while in America, White returned to England to obtain more supplies for the colony, planning to return in a year. Unfortunately for the colonists at Roanoke, one year became three. The first delay came when Queen Elizabeth I ordered all vessels to remain at port for potential use against the Spanish Armada. After England's 1588 victory over the Spanish Armada, the ships were given permission to sail.

The second delay came after White's small fleet set sail for Roanoke and his crew insisted on sailing first towards Cuba in hopes of capturing treasure-laden Spanish merchant ships. Enormous riches described by their pilot, an experienced Portuguese navigator hired by Raleigh, outweighed White's objections to the delay.

When the supply ship arrived in Roanoke, three years later than planned, the colonists had disappeared. The only clue to their fate was the word "CROATOAN" and the letters "CRO" carved into tree trunks. White had arranged with the settlers that if they should move, the name of their destination be carved into a tree or corner post. This suggested the possibility that they had moved to Croatoan Island, but a hurricane prevented John White from investigating the island for survivors. Other speculation includes their having assimilated into the pre-existing local population, starved, or been swept away or lost at sea during the stormy weather of 1588. No further attempts at contact were recorded for some years. Whatever the fate of the settlers, the settlement is now remembered as the "Roanoke Colony", later known as the "Lost Colony".

Raleigh himself never visited North America, although he led expeditions in 1595 and 1617 to the Orinoco river basin in South America in search of the golden city of El Dorado. These expeditions were funded primarily by Raleigh and his friends but never provided the steady stream of revenue necessary to maintain a colony in America.

== 1580s ==
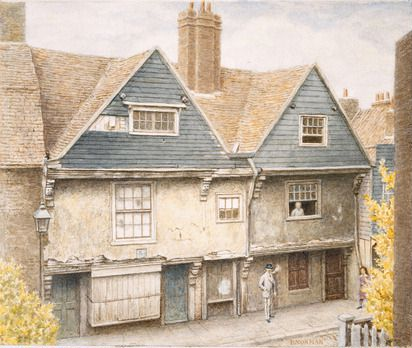
Walter Raleigh's house in Blackwall Harbour by Philip Norman (before 1931)

In 1580 Raleigh went to fight in Ireland against the 2nd Desmond Rebellion. In December 1581, he returned to England. He took part in court life and became a favourite of Queen Elizabeth I because of his efforts at increasing the Protestant Church in Ireland. In 1585, Raleigh was knighted and was appointed warden of the stannaries, that is of the tin mines of Cornwall and Devon, Lord Lieutenant of Cornwall and vice-admiral of the two counties. He was a member of parliament for Devonshire in 1585 and 1586. He was also granted the right to colonise America.

Raleigh commissioned shipbuilder R. Chapman of Deptford to build a ship for him. She was originally called Ark but became Ark Raleigh, following the convention at the time by which the ship bore the name of her owner. The Crown (in the person of Queen Elizabeth I) purchased the ship from Raleigh in January 1587 for £5,000 (£1 million in 2015). This took the form of a reduction in the sum that Sir Walter owed the queen; he received Exchequer tallies but no money. As a result, the ship was renamed Ark Royal.

In 1586 one of Raleigh's expeditions caught Spanish explorer Pedro Sarmiento de Gamboa. Raleigh held Gamboa prisoner in his house and had long conversations with him. Gamboa passed messages to the Spanish ambassador who forwarded them to King Philip II. Raleigh wanted to defect to Spain and sell his ship the Ark. Philip refused to buy the ship, but encouraged the passing of information from Raleigh.

In 1588, Raleigh had some involvement with defence against the Spanish Armada at Devon. The ship that he had built, offered to sell to Spain, and later sold to the crown, the Ark Royal, was Lord High Admiral Howard's flagship.

== 1590–1594 ==
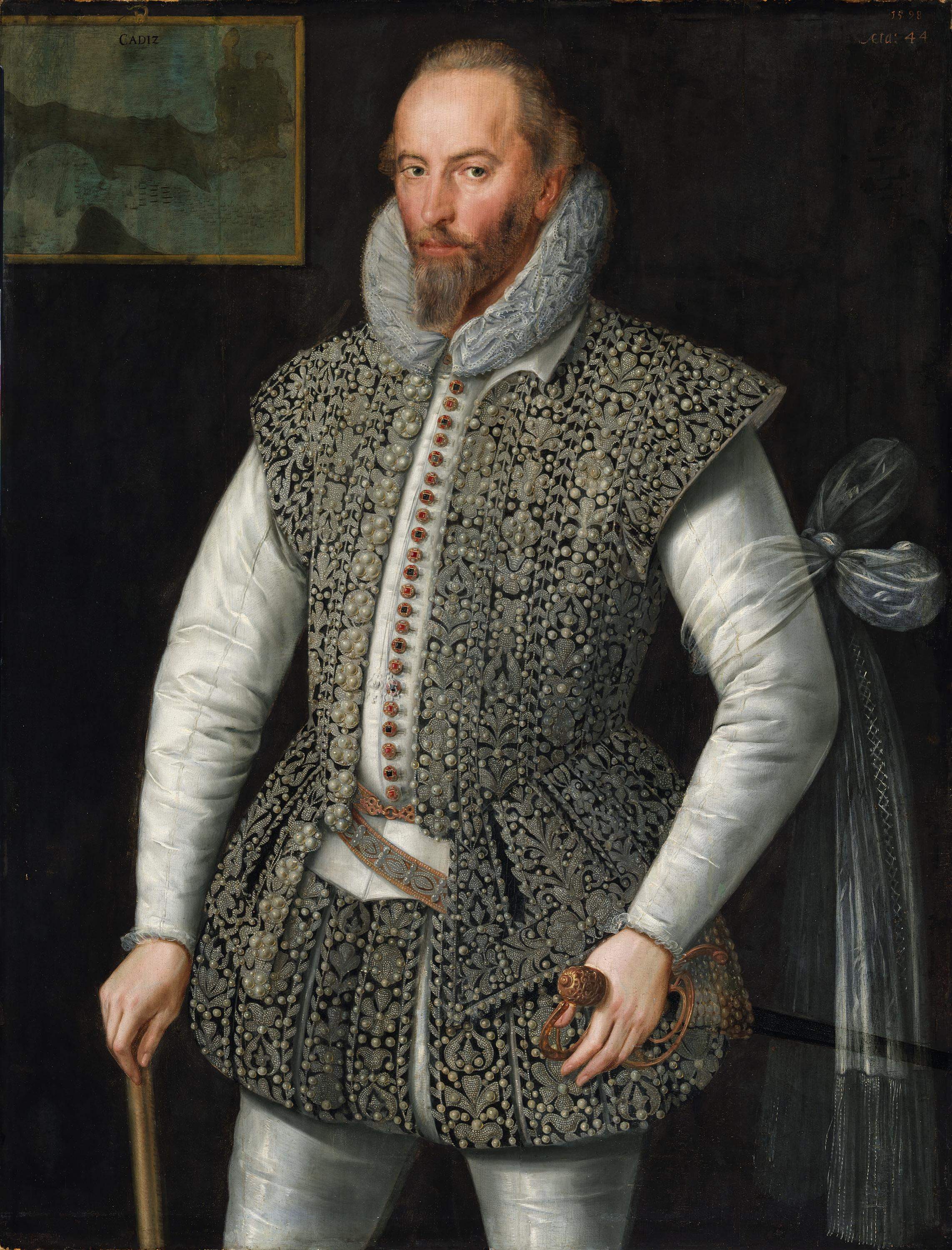
Sir Walter Raleigh by William Segar

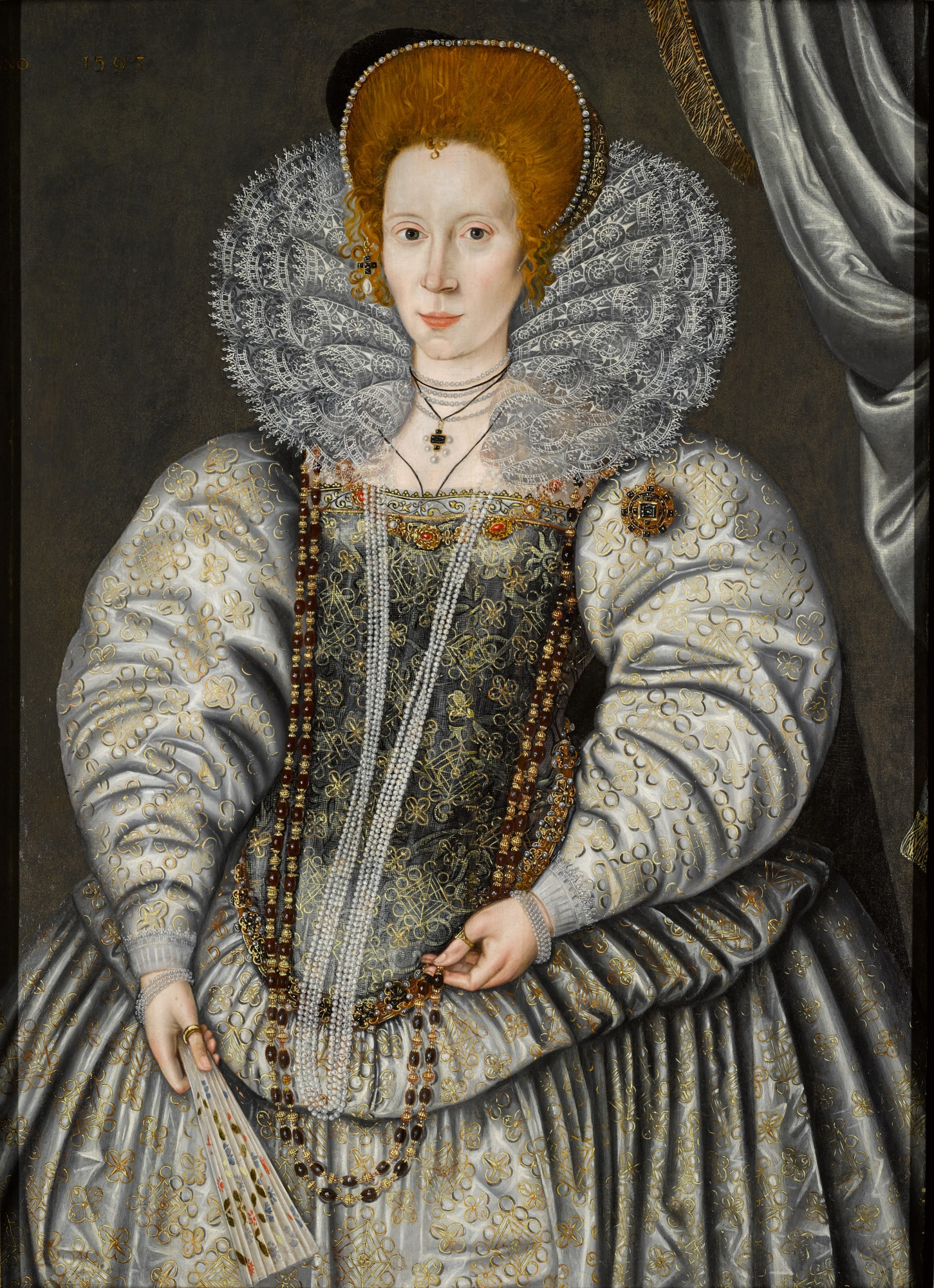
Elizabeth "Bess" Throckmorton Raleigh by William Segar 1595

In 1592, Raleigh was given many rewards by the Queen, including Durham House in the Strand and the estate of Sherborne, Dorset. He was appointed Captain of the Yeomen of the Guard. However, he had not been given any of the great offices of state.

In 1591, Raleigh secretly married Elizabeth "Bess" Throckmorton (or Throgmorton). She was one of the Queen's ladies-in-waiting, 11 years his junior, and was pregnant at the time. She gave birth to a son, believed to be named Damerei, who was given to a wet nurse at Durham House, and died of plague in October 1592. Bess resumed her duties to the queen. The following year, the unauthorised marriage was discovered and the Queen ordered Raleigh to be imprisoned and Bess dismissed from court. Both were imprisoned in the Tower of London in June 1592. He was released from prison in August 1592 to manage a recently returned expedition and attack on the Spanish coast. The fleet was recalled by the Queen, but not before it captured an incredibly rich prize—a merchant ship (carrack) named Madre de Deus (Mother of God) off Flores. Raleigh was sent to organise and divide the spoils of the ship. He was sent back to the Tower, but by early 1593 had been released and become a member of Parliament.

It was several years before Raleigh returned to favour, and he travelled extensively in this time. Raleigh and his wife remained devoted to each other. They had two more sons, Walter (known as Wat) in 1593 and Carew in 1605.

Raleigh was elected a burgess of Mitchell, Cornwall, in the parliament of 1593. He retired to his estate at Sherborne, where he built a new house, completed in 1594, known then as Sherborne Lodge. Since extended, it is now known as Sherborne New Castle. He made friends with the local gentry, such as Sir Ralph Horsey of Clifton Maybank and Charles Thynne of Longleat. During this period at a dinner party at Horsey's, Raleigh had a heated discussion about religion with Reverend Ralph Ironsides. The argument later gave rise to charges of atheism against Raleigh, though the charges were dismissed. He was elected to Parliament, speaking on religious and naval matters.

== First voyage to Guiana ==
In 1594, he came into possession of a Spanish account of a great golden city at the headwaters of the Caroní River. A year later, he explored what is now Guyana and eastern Venezuela in search of Lake Parime and Manoa, the legendary city. Once back in England, he published The Discovery of Guiana (1596), an account of his voyage which made exaggerated claims as to what had been discovered. The book can be seen as a contribution to the El Dorado legend. Venezuela has gold deposits, but no evidence indicates that Raleigh found any mines. He is sometimes said to have discovered Angel Falls, but these claims are considered far-fetched.

== 1596–1603 ==
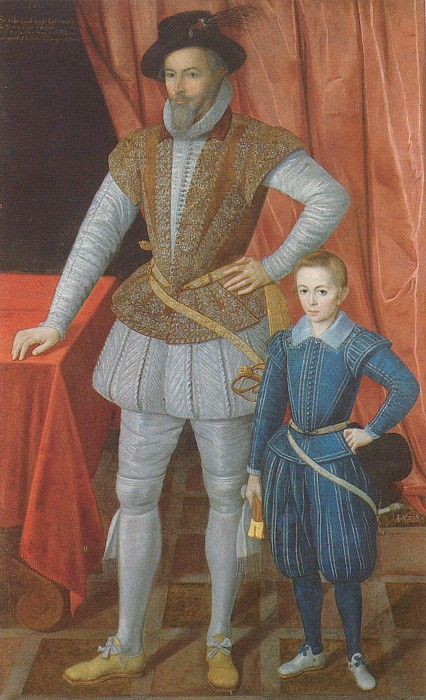
Raleigh and his son Walter in 1602

In 1596, Raleigh took part in the capture of Cádiz, where he was wounded. He also served as the rear admiral (a principal command) of the Islands Voyage to the Azores in 1597. On his return from the Azores, Raleigh helped England defend itself against the major threat of the 3rd Spanish Armada during the autumn of 1597. The Armada was dispersed in the Channel and later was devastated by a storm off Ireland. Lord Howard of Effingham and Raleigh were able to organise a fleet that resulted in the capture of a Spanish ship in retreat carrying vital information regarding the Spanish plans.

In 1597 Raleigh was chosen as member of parliament for Dorset and in 1601 for Cornwall. He was unique in the Elizabethan period in sitting for three counties.

From 1600 to 1603, as governor of the Channel Island of Jersey, Raleigh modernised its defences. This included the construction of a new fort protecting the approaches to Saint Helier, Fort Isabella Bellissima, or Elizabeth Castle.

== Trial and imprisonment ==
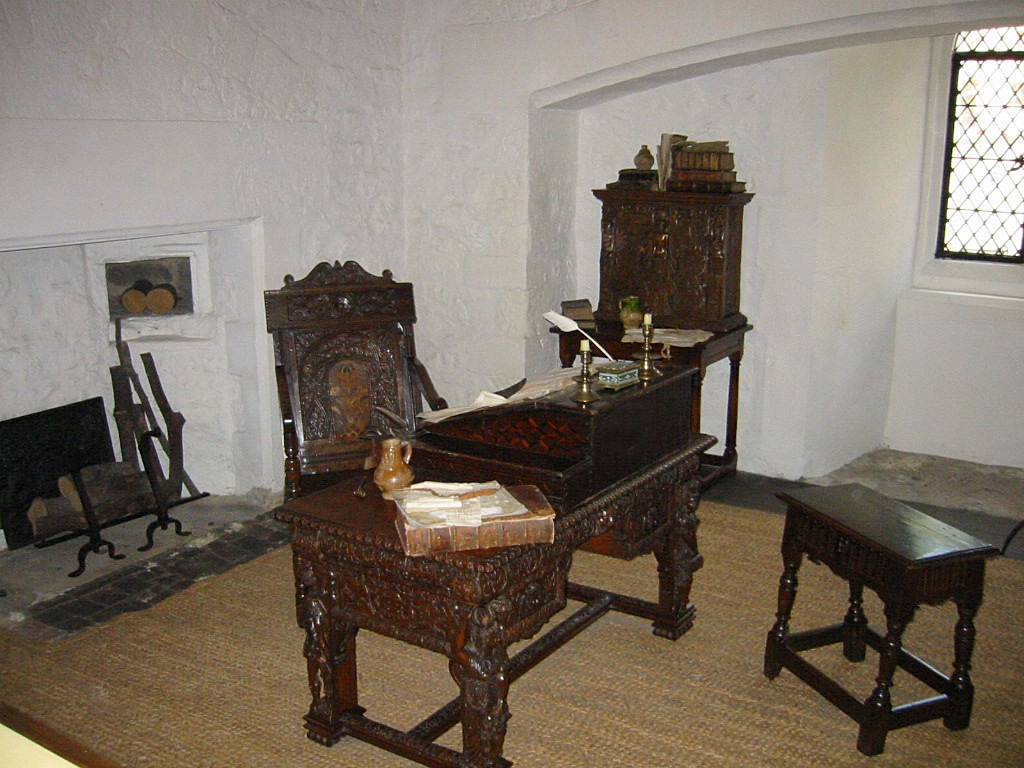
Raleigh's cell, Bloody Tower, Tower of London

Royal favour with Queen Elizabeth had been restored by this time, but his good fortune did not last; the Queen died on 24 March 1603. Raleigh was arrested on 19 July 1603 at what is now the Old Exeter Inn in Ashburton, charged with treason for his involvement in the Main Plot against Elizabeth's successor, James I, and imprisoned in the Tower of London.

Raleigh's trial began on 17 November in the converted Great Hall of Winchester Castle. Raleigh conducted his own defence. The chief evidence against him was the signed and sworn confession of his friend Henry Brooke, 11th Baron Cobham. Raleigh repeatedly requested that Cobham be called to testify. "[Let] my acuser come face to face, and be deposed. Were the case but for a small copyhold, you would have witnesses or good proof to lead the jury to a verdict; and I am here for my life!" Raleigh argued that the evidence against him was "hearsay", but the tribunal refused to allow Cobham to testify and be cross-examined. Raleigh's trial has been regularly cited as influential in establishing a common law right to confront accusers in court. Raleigh was convicted, but King James spared his life.

While imprisoned in the Tower, Raleigh wrote his incomplete The History of the World. Using a wide array of sources in six languages, Raleigh was fully abreast of the latest continental scholarship. He wrote not about England, but of the ancient world with a heavy emphasis on geography. Despite his intention of providing current advice to the King of England, King James I complained that it was "too sawcie in censuring Princes". Raleigh remained imprisoned in the Tower until 1616. His son, Carew, was conceived and born (in 1604 or 1605) while Raleigh was imprisoned in the Tower.

== Second voyage to Guiana ==
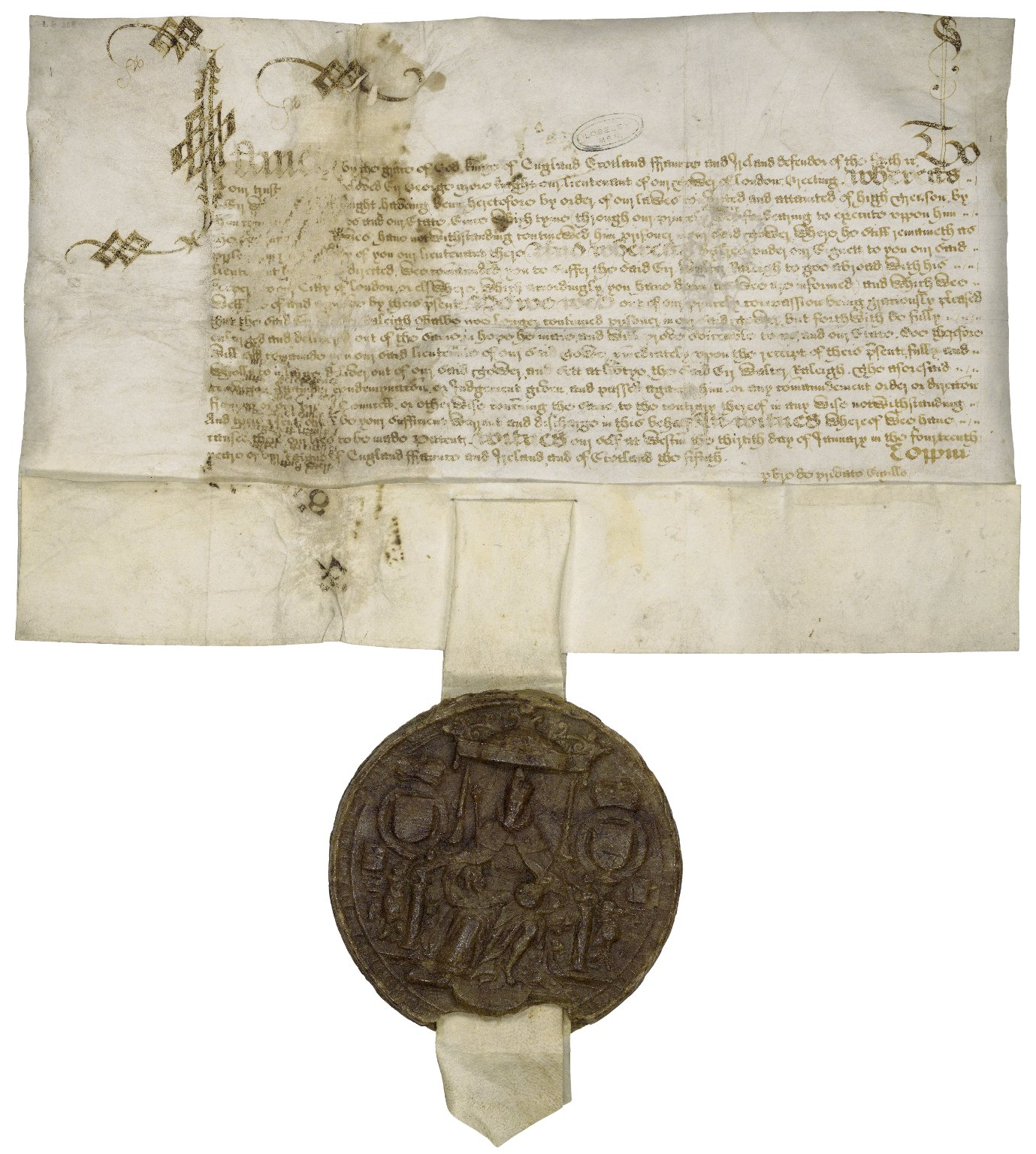
James I's royal warrant pardoning Raleigh in 1617

In 1617, Raleigh was pardoned by the King and granted permission to conduct a second expedition to Venezuela in search of El Dorado. During the expedition, a detachment of Raleigh's men under the command of his long-time friend Lawrence Kemys attacked the Spanish outpost of Santo Tomé de Guayana on the Orinoco river, in violation of peace treaties with Spain and against Raleigh's orders. A condition of Raleigh's pardon was avoidance of any hostility against Spanish colonies or shipping. In the initial attack on the settlement, Raleigh's son, Walter, was fatally shot. Kemys informed Raleigh of his son's death and begged for forgiveness, but did not receive it, and at once committed suicide. On Raleigh's return to England, an outraged Count Gondomar, the Spanish ambassador, demanded that Raleigh's death sentence be reinstated by King James, who had little choice but to do so. Raleigh was brought to London from Plymouth by Sir Lewis Stukley, where he passed up numerous opportunities to make an effective escape.

== Execution and aftermath ==
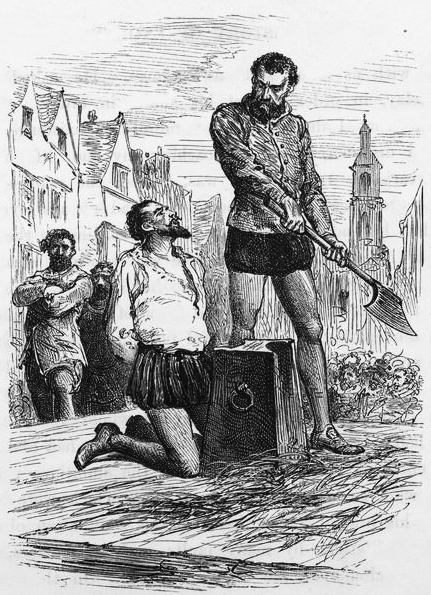
Raleigh just before he was beheaded – an illustration from circa 1860

Raleigh was beheaded in the Old Palace Yard at the Palace of Westminster on 29 October 1618. "Let us dispatch", he said to his executioner. "At this hour my ague comes upon me. I would not have my enemies think I quaked from fear." After he was allowed to see the axe that would be used to behead him, he mused: "This is a sharp Medicine, but it is a Physician for all diseases and miseries." According to biographers, Raleigh's last words, spoken to the hesitating executioner, were: "What dost thou fear? Strike, man, strike!"

Having been one of the people to popularise tobacco smoking in England, he left a small tobacco pouch, found in his cell shortly after his execution. Engraved upon the pouch was a Latin inscription: Comes meus fuit in illo miserrimo tempore ("It was my companion at that most miserable time").

Raleigh's head was embalmed and presented to his wife. His body was to be buried in the local church in Beddington, Surrey, the home of Lady Raleigh, but was finally laid to rest in St. Margaret's, Westminster, where his tomb is located. "The Lords", she wrote, "have given me his dead body, though they have denied me his life. God hold me in my wits." It has been said that Lady Raleigh kept her husband's head in a velvet bag until her death. After Raleigh's wife's death 29 years later, his head was removed to his tomb and interred at St. Margaret's Church. Although Raleigh's popularity had waned considerably since his Elizabethan heyday, his execution was seen by many, both at the time and since, as unnecessary and unjust, as for many years his involvement in the Main Plot seemed to have been limited to a meeting with Lord Cobham. One of the judges at his trial later said: "The justice of England has never been so degraded and injured as by the condemnation of the honourable Sir Walter Raleigh."

== Works ==
- A Report of the Truth of the Fight about the Iles of Açores, this Last Sommer. Betwixt the Reuenge, One of her Maiesties Shippes, and an Armada of the King of Spaine. London: Printed [by John Windet] for William Ponsonbie. 1591. OCLC 228714647, about the ship Revenge.
- The Historie of the World. In five bookes (first ed. 1614). R. White, T. Basset. 1677.
- The Discovery of Guiana. Hakluyt Society. 1848.

== Poetry ==
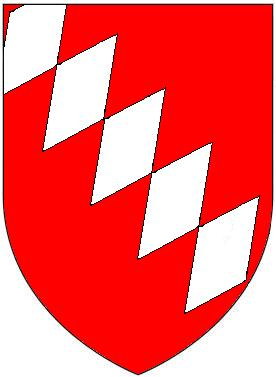
Arms of Sir Walter Raleigh: Gules, five fusils conjoined in bend argent

Raleigh's poetry is written in the relatively straightforward, unornamented mode known as the plain style. C. S. Lewis considered Raleigh one of the era's "silver poets", a group of writers who resisted the Italian Renaissance influence of dense classical reference and elaborate poetic devices. His writing contains strong personal treatments of themes such as love, loss, beauty, and time. Most of his poems are short lyrics that were inspired by actual events.

In poems such as "What is Our Life" and "The Lie", Raleigh expresses a contemptus mundi (contempt of the world) attitude more characteristic of the Middle Ages than of the dawning era of humanistic optimism. But his lesser-known long poem "The Ocean's Love to Cynthia" combines this vein with the more elaborate conceits associated with his contemporaries Edmund Spenser and John Donne, expressing a melancholy sense of history. The poem was written during his imprisonment in the Tower of London.

Raleigh wrote a poetic response to Christopher Marlowe's "The Passionate Shepherd to His Love" of 1592, entitled "The Nymph's Reply to the Shepherd". Both were written in the style of traditional pastoral poetry and follow the structure of six four-line stanzas employing a rhyme scheme of AABB, with Raleigh's an almost line-for-line refutation of Marlowe's sentiments. Years later, the 20th-century poet William Carlos Williams would join the poetic "argument" with his "Raleigh Was Right".

=== List of poems ===
All finished, and some unfinished, poems written by Raleigh or plausibly attributed to him: (Note: As ye came from the holy land is often attributed to Raleigh, but, in the words of Bullett 1947, p. 280, "it certainly existed before Ralegh arrived on the scene; Ralegh's connexion with it is largely a matter of conjecture")

- "The Advice"
- "Another of the Same"
- "Conceit begotten by the Eyes"
- "Epitaph on Sir Philip Sidney"
- "Epitaph on the Earl of Leicester"
- "Even such is Time"
- "The Excuse"
- "False Love"
- "Farewell to the Court"
- "His Petition to Queen Anne of Denmark"
- "If Cynthia be a Queen"
- "In Commendation of George Gascoigne's Steel Glass"
- "The Lie"
- "Like Hermit Poor"
- "Lines from Catullus"
- "Love and Time"
- "My Body in the Walls captive"
- "The Nymph's Reply to the Shepherd"
- "Of Spenser's Faery Queen"
- "On the Snuff of a Candle"
- "The Ocean's Love to Cynthia"
- "A Poem entreating of Sorrow"
- "A Poem put into my Lady Laiton's Pocket"
- "The Pilgrimage"
- "A Prognistication upon Cards and Dice"
- "The Shepherd's Praise of Diana"
- "Sweet Unsure"
- "To His Mistress"
- "To the Translator of Lucan's Pharsalia"
- "What is Our Life?"
- "The Wood, the Weed, the Wag"

=== Writing Shakespeare ===
In 1845, Shakespeare scholar Delia Bacon first proposed that a group of authors had actually written the plays later attributed to William Shakespeare, the main writer being Walter Raleigh. Later, George S. Caldwell asserted that Raleigh was actually the sole author. These claims have been supported by other scholars throughout subsequent years, including Albert J. Beveridge and Henry Pemberton, but are rejected by the majority of Shakespearean scholars today. (Note: Kathman 2003, p. 621: "...antiStratfordism has remained a fringe belief system"; Schoenbaum 1991, p. 450; Paster 1999, p. 38: "To ask me about the authorship question ... is like asking a palaeontologist to debate a creationist's account of the fossil record."; Nelson 2004, pp. 149–151: "I do not know of a single professor of the 1,300-member Shakespeare Association of America who questions the identity of Shakespeare ... antagonism to the authorship debate from within the profession is so great that it would be as difficult for a professed Oxfordian to be hired in the first place, much less gain tenure..."; Carroll 2004, pp. 278–279: "I have never met anyone in an academic position like mine, in the Establishment, who entertained the slightest doubt as to Shakespeare's authorship of the general body of plays attributed to him."; Pendleton 1994, p. 21: "Shakespeareans sometimes take the position that to even engage the Oxfordian hypothesis is to give it a countenance it does not warrant."; Sutherland & Watts 2000, p. 7: "There is, it should be noted, no academic Shakespearian of any standing who goes along with the Oxfordian theory."; Gibson 2005, p. 30: "...most of the great Shakespearean scholars are to be found in the Stratfordian camp...")

== Legacy ==
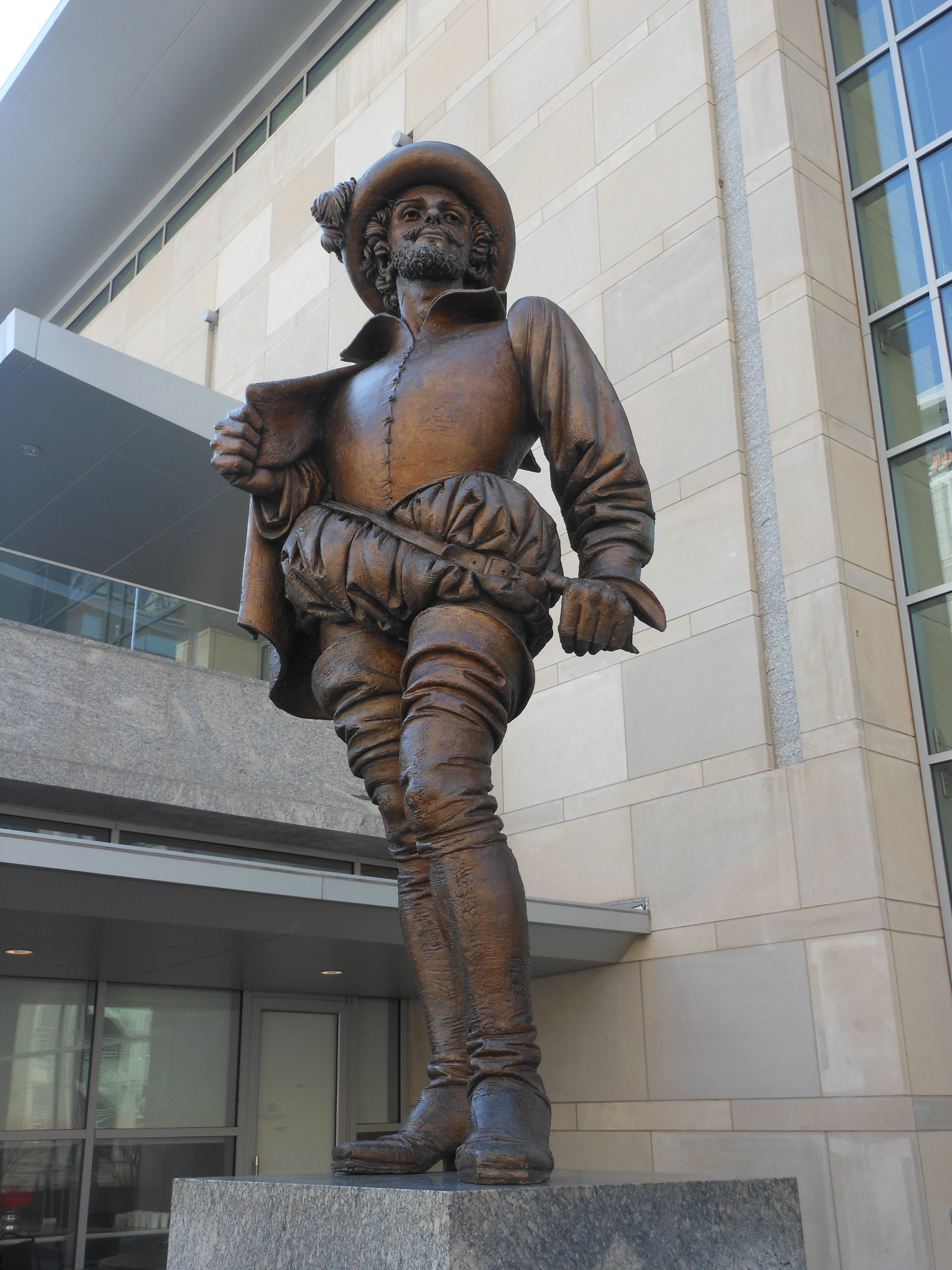
Statue of Sir Walter Raleigh at Raleigh Convention Center

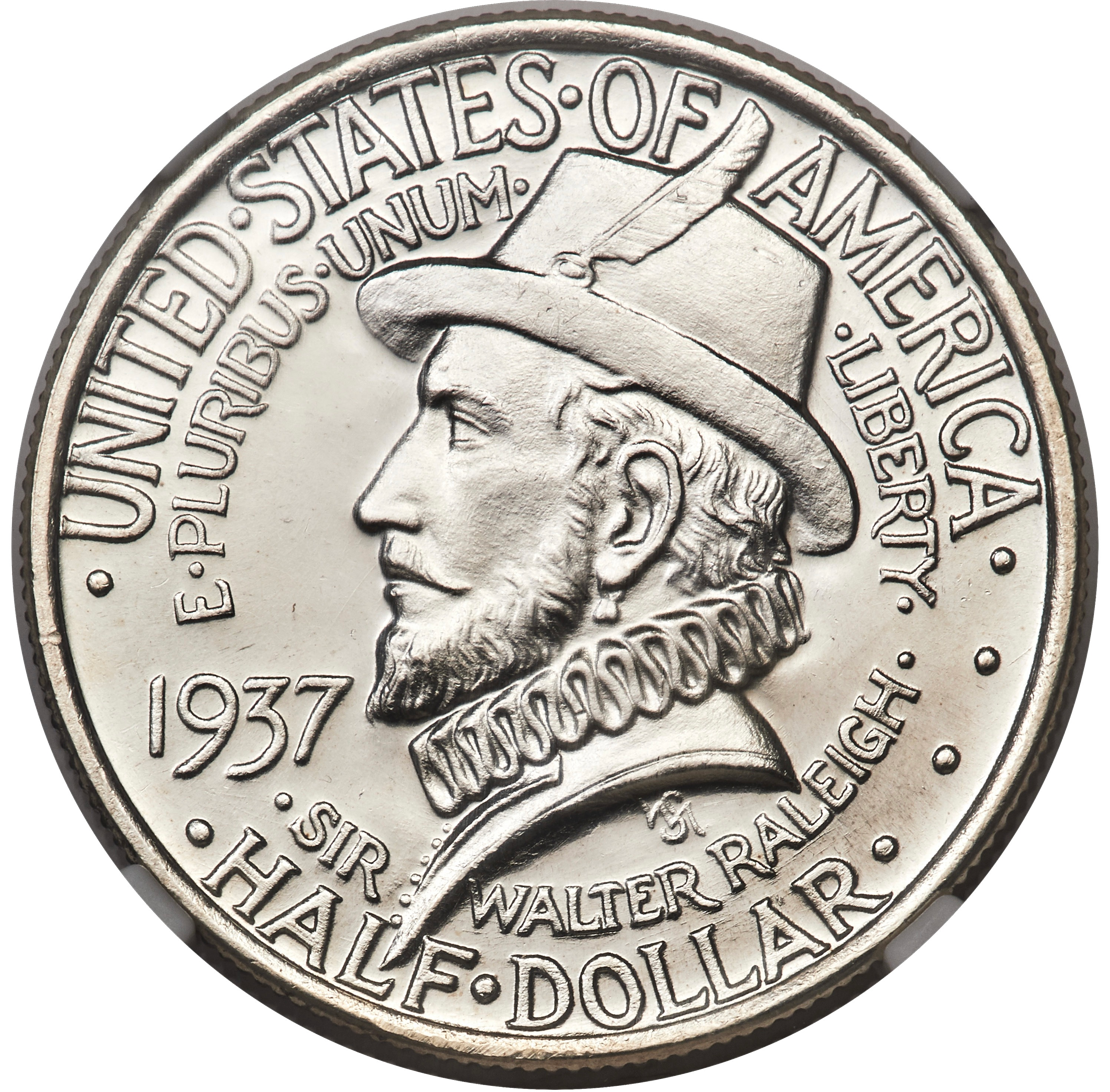
The commemorative Roanoke Island half dollar, issued by the US in 1937, bears Walter Raleigh's portrait

In 2002, Raleigh was featured in the BBC poll of the 100 Greatest Britons.

A galliard was composed in honour of Raleigh by either Francis Cutting or Richard Allison.

The state capital of North Carolina, its second-largest city, was named Raleigh in 1792, after Sir Walter, sponsor of the Roanoke Colony. In the city, a bronze statue, which has been moved around different locations within the city, was cast in honour of the city's namesake. The "Lost Colony" is commemorated at the Fort Raleigh National Historic Site on Roanoke Island, North Carolina.

Raleigh County, West Virginia, is named after him.

Mount Raleigh in the Pacific Ranges of the Coast Mountains in British Columbia, Canada, was named for him, with related features the Raleigh Glacier and Raleigh Creek named in association with the mountain. Mount Gilbert, just to Mount Raleigh's south, was named for his half-brother, Sir Humphrey.

Raleigh has been widely supposed to have been responsible for introducing the potato to Europe and was a key figure in bringing it to Ireland. However, modern historians dispute this claim, suggesting it impossible for Raleigh to have discovered the potato in the places he visited.

Due to Raleigh's role in the popularisation of smoking, John Lennon humorously referred to him as "such a stupid get" in the song "I'm So Tired" on The Beatles (White Album) in 1968.

Various colourful stories are told about him, such as laying his cloak over a puddle for the Queen, but they are apocryphal. The story of Raleigh's trial is included in John George Phillimore's 1850 book The History and Principles of Evidence, and his commentary on the story is included in many law school textbooks on evidence in common law countries.

The author George Garrett's historical novel Death of the Fox explores Raleigh's relationships with Elizabeth I and her successor James I.

== Raleigh's descendants ==
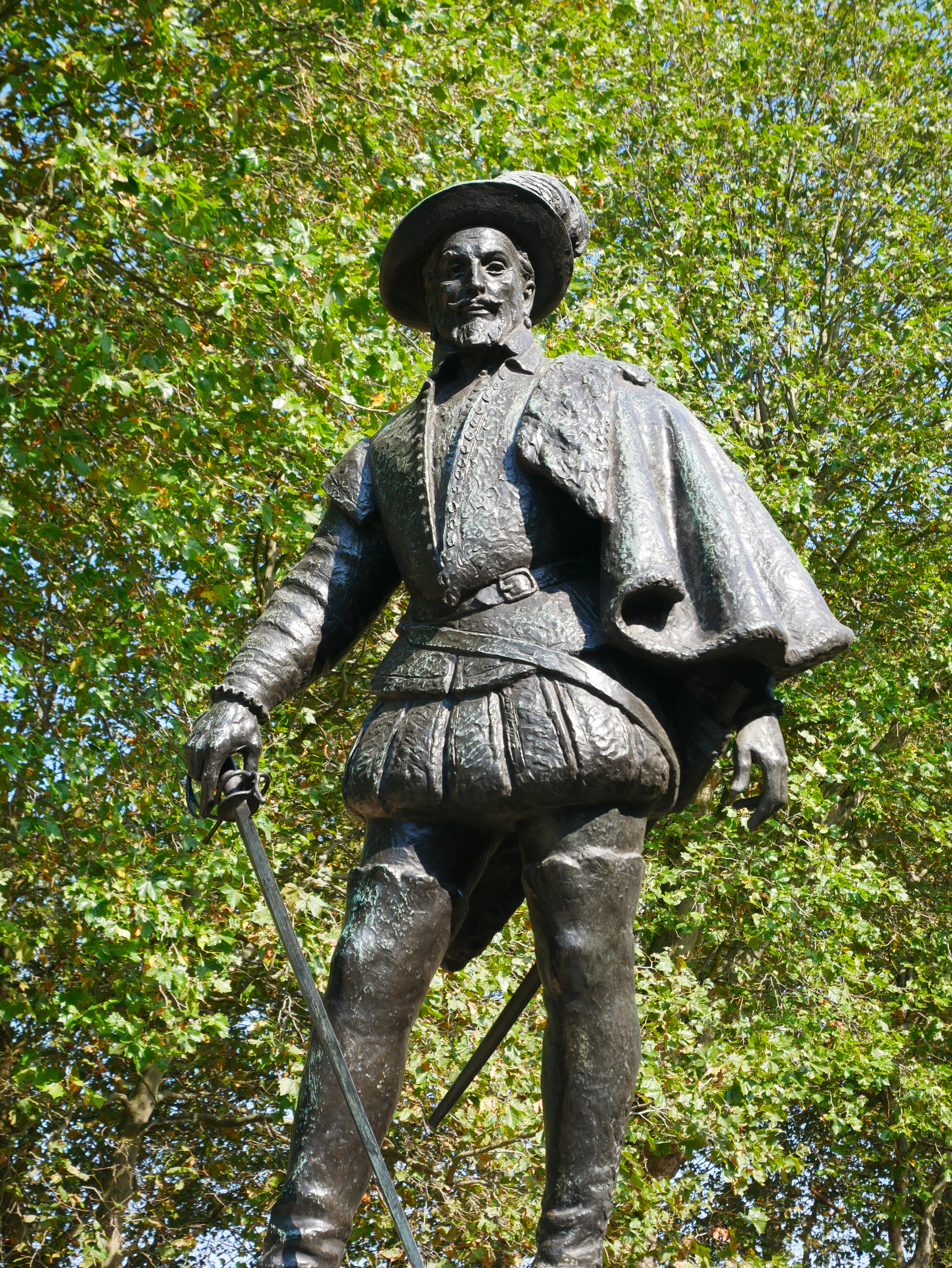
A statue of Raleigh in Greenwich, southeast London

Many people claim descent from Sir Walter Raleigh, but nearly all have no basis in fact. The only authentic lines of descent are as follows:

Raleigh's only surviving child, Carew Raleigh, had three surviving children—Walter (d. 1660), Anne (d. 1708) and Philip (d. 1705).

The elder son, Walter Raleigh, was knighted in June 1660, but died two months later. He was buried at West Horsley. He left three surviving children – Elizabeth, Philippa and Anne. Philippa (who married Oliver Weekes, of Tortingdon, Sussex) and Anne (who married William Knight, of Barrells, Warwickshire) left descendants. It was Philippa Weekes' daughter, Elizabeth Elwes, who seems to have owned the main store of Raleigh memorabilia and was consulted by William Oldys in 1735 when he was writing his Life of Raleigh.

Anne Raleigh married Sir Peter Tyrrell, Bt. of Castlethorpe, Bucks. Their son Thomas Tyrrell, 2nd Bt. left two daughters – Christobella, who married as her third husband, Richard Fiennes, 6th Viscount Saye & Sele, but died without surviving issue in 1789. The younger daughter, Harriet, married Francis Mann, of Kidlington, Oxfordshire, and died in 1785, having had a daughter, Harriet, who married Capt. Joseph Mead and died in 1784, leaving issue.

Philip Raleigh championed his grandfather's cause, publishing several of his hitherto unpublished papers. He had a family of four sons and three daughters. The youngest son, Carew Raleigh, page of honour to William III, was serving as a captain's servant on HMS Breda when he died of fever in the West Indies in 1697, aged seventeen. The second son, Lieut. Brudenell Raleigh, was also serving in the navy in the West Indies when he died of fever in June 1698, aged 22. The eldest son, Captain Walter Raleigh, Grenadier Guards, was page of honour to Queen Mary, and was killed at the siege of Schellenberg in 1704, aged 31. He was unmarried. After Walter's death, his father was granted a pension by the crown, 'in consideration of his 3 sons being slain in the late and present war'. The third son, Captain-Lieutenant Grenville Raleigh, served in the Duke of Marlborough's army throughout the War of the Spanish Succession and died of fever in 1717, while guarding the prisoners at Chester after the 1715 Jacobite rising. He had married and had two sons and a daughter, Mary. On the death of his daughter in Bath in 1783, it was noted that she was 'the only surviving descendant in the direct line of Sir Walter Raleigh'.

Of Philip Raleigh's daughters, Anne and Elizabeth both died unmarried. The eldest daughter, Frances, married William Honywood, eldest son of Sir William Honywood, of Evington Place, Elmsted, Kent and died in 1730. Her many descendants include the present Lord Mountbatten and the actor Hugh Grant.

== See also ==
- List of colonial governors of Virginia
- Sir Walter, a race horse
- The Armada Service

Court offices
Preceded by The Earl of Bedford	Lord Warden of the Stannaries; 1584–1603	Succeeded by The Earl of Pembroke
Honorary titles
Preceded by Sir Francis Godolphin; Sir William Mohun; Peter Edgcumbe; Richard Carew	Lord Lieutenant of Cornwall; 1587–1603	Succeeded by The Earl of Pembroke
Government offices
Preceded by Edward Seymour	Vice-Admiral of Devon; 1585–1603	Succeeded by The Earl of Bath (North Devon) and Sir Richard Hawkins (South Devon)
Preceded by John Best	Captain of the Yeomen of the Guard; 1597–1603	Succeeded by Sir Thomas Erskine
Preceded by Sir Matthew Arundell	Custos Rotulorum of Dorset; 1598–1603	Succeeded by Viscount Howard of Bindon
Preceded by Sir Anthony Paulet	Governor of Jersey; 1600–1603	Succeeded by Sir John Peyton
