= The Passionate Shepherd to His Love =

Poem by Christopher Marlowe

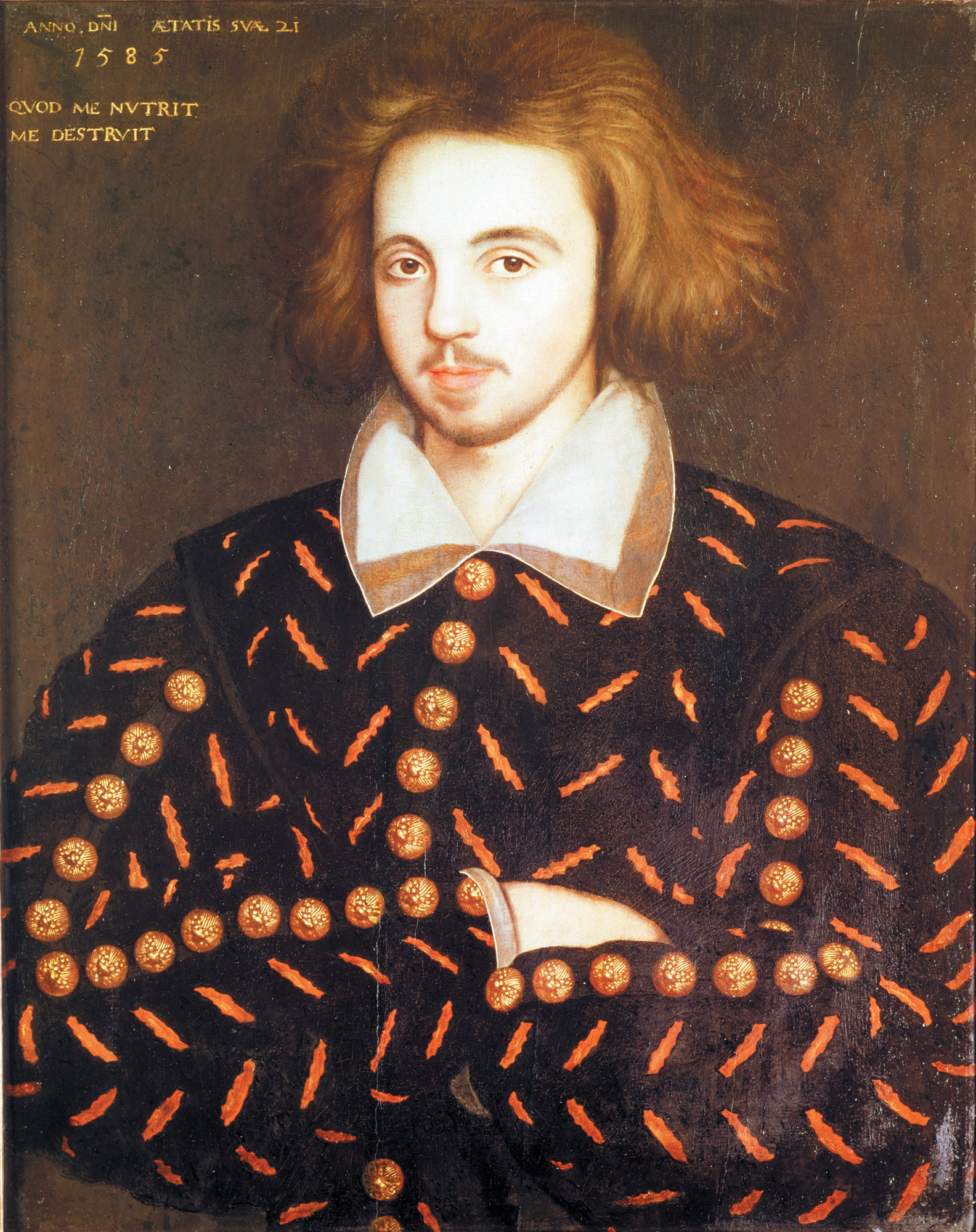
Presumed portrait of the poet Christopher Marlowe whilst a student at Corpus Christi College, Cambridge in 1585.

"The Passionate Shepherd to His Love" (1599), by Christopher Marlowe, is a pastoral poem from the English Renaissance (1485–1603). Marlowe composed the poem in iambic tetrameter (four feet of one unstressed syllable followed by one stressed syllable) in six stanzas, and each stanza is composed of two rhyming couplets; thus the first line of the poem reads: "Come live with me and be my love".

== The poem ==
"The Passionate Shepherd to His Love" (1599)

by Christopher Marlowe (1564–1593)

Come live with me, and be my love;
And we will all the pleasures prove
That hills and valleys, dales and fields,
Woods, or steepy mountain yields.

And we will sit upon the rocks,
Seeing the shepherds feed their flocks
By shallow rivers to whose falls
Melodious birds sing madrigals.

And I will make thee beds of roses,
And a thousand fragrant posies;
A cap of flowers, and a kirtle
Embroidered all with leaves of myrtle;

A gown made of the finest wool
Which from our pretty lambs we pull;
Fair linèd slippers for the cold,
With buckles of the purest gold;

A belt of straw and ivy-buds,
With coral clasps and amber studs:
And, if these pleasures may thee move,
Come live with me, and be my love.

The shepherds' swains shall dance and sing
For thy delight each May-morning:
If these delights thy mind may move,
Then live with me, and be my love.

== Effect and influence ==
Walter Raleigh replied to Marlowe's shepherd with the poem "The Nymph's Reply to the Shepherd" (1600) with romantic realism countering romantic idealism; his Nymph reminds the shepherd that time will wither all the material gifts he offers, and his pastoral ideal will not last.

Subsequent responses to Marlowe have come from numerous other writers, including John Donne, Izaak Walton, Robert Herrick, C. Day Lewis, William Carlos Williams, Dorothy Parker, Ogden Nash, W. D. Snodgrass, Douglas Crase and Greg Delanty.

The poem inspired parodies, such as "The Milkmaid's Song," "The Rinker's Song" and "The Passionate Statistician to his Love." This last appeared in the satirical magazine Punch and poked fun at the politician George Goschen, who had described himself as "a passionate statistician." The phrase was picked up by the biographer of Florence Nightingale, E. T. Cook, and applied to her. The sobriquet has stuck.

In about 1846 the composer William Sterndale Bennett set the words as a four-part madrigal.

In the 1939 film The Private Lives of Elizabeth and Essex, both poems are sung as a duet by Mistress Margaret Radcliffe (Nanette Fabray), singing Marlowe's original words, and Lady Penelope Gray (Olivia de Havilland) taking Raleigh's rebuttal. The performance infuriates Queen Elizabeth (Bette Davis) whose doomed love for Robert Devereaux, 2nd Earl of Essex (Errol Flynn), 32 years her junior, is the subject of the story.

The line "Come live with me and be my love" was the inspiration for the 1941 film Come Live with Me, as well as the song "Come Live with Me" sung by Tony Scotti in the 1967 film Valley of the Dolls. It was also the third of the Liebeslieder Polkas for Mixed Chorus and Piano Five Hands, written by fictional composer P. D. Q. Bach (Peter Schickele) and performed by the Swarthmore College Chorus in 1980.

In "Birthday Madrigals" (1995) John Rutter sets both poems, giving Marlowe's words to tenors and basses, with the women singing Raleigh's reply, and the men singing over the women, changing the feel from question and reply to two people not listening to each other.

The poem was adapted for the lyrics of the 1930s-style swing song performed by Stacey Kent at the celebratory ball in the 1995 film William Shakespeare's Richard III. Other songs to draw lyrics from the poem include The Prayer Chain song "Antarctica" (1996) from the album of the same name, and The Real Tuesday Weld song "Let It Come Down" from their album The Last Werewolf (2011). In 2015, the Royal Shakespeare Company used a version of the song in its production (set at the end of World War I) of Much Ado About Nothing (under the name Love's Labour's Won), played by the character Balthasar (Harry Waller), and sung by the whole cast.
