= The Prayer Chain =

American Christian alternative rock band

- Origin: California, U.S.
- Genres: Christian alternative rock Alternative Rock Alternative Metal Grunge
- Years active: 1991–1995, 1998, 2003, 2017–2018
- Labels: Reunion, Rode Dog
- Past members: Tim Taber; Andrew Prickett; Eric Campuzano; Wayne Everett
- Website: theprayerchain.com

The Prayer Chain was a 1990s Christian alternative rock band. The band has been called "the epitome of the Christian underground". The Prayer Chain was known for producing moody, angst-ridden music which was, in turn, the result of creative differences within the band and with their record label.

== History ==
The Prayer Chain formed in February 1990 when Campuzano & Prickett's band, Laughing Boy, broke up at the same time as Taber's band, Tapestry, broke up. Campuzano knew Taber through a Bible study group. Originally, Taber both sang and played drums, though drum machines were also used. The band auditioned Everett to play drums later that year after meeting at a Prayer Chain show in California.

Their first album, The Neverland Sessions was recorded with Steve Hindalong at Neverland Studios and was released independently.

After signing to Reunion Records they put out the Whirlpool EP and started touring, while focusing on their first album, Shawl, released in 1993. In 1993, The Prayer Chain released their first collection of all new material since 1990. In April 1994, the band released their first live recording toward the end of the tour for Shawl. It included several bonus tracks from the Shawl era.

After extensive national and international shows they started working on their album, Mercury, which was released in 1995. Originally the band wanted to do a worship-based album. Producer Steve Hindalong is credited by the band as helping bring the project together. Themes on the album include distance ("Mercury", "Creole", "Shiver", "Waterdogs") and disconnection ("Grylliade") as well as love ("Manta Rae" and "Bendy Line") and worship ("Humb", "Sky High" and "Sun Stoned").

After disbanding the band performed at a reunion show in Chicago in 1998, the Gene Eugene tribute show in 2000, some local California shows, 2003 reunion shows at Cornerstone Festival, and the Flevo Festival in the Netherlands. They also released some of their work and rarities through Bandcamp website.

In April 2015, the band announced they would be releasing Mercury on double vinyl through Kickstarter to mark the 20th anniversary of the album. Funding for the album was achieved within three hours of the announcement. In early 2018, the band announced two reunion shows to celebrate the 25th anniversary of the release of Shawl.

== Members ==
- Tim Taber – vocals, founder of Floodgate Records (Cool Hand Luke, The Myriad) and Transparent Productions.
- Andrew Prickett – guitar, now plays with CUSH and does extensive recording/producing/engineering, has also played with The Violet Burning, My Brother's Mother, OneRepublic and others.
- Eric Campuzano – bass guitar, now plays guitar for The Lassie Foundation & Stranger Kings. He's also released two drone solo projects under the moniker Charity Empressa. He also plays bass with CUSH, and has played with Starflyer 59.
- Wayne Everett – drums, now playing guitar and started The Lassie Foundation, has played in Starflyer 59 and CUSH, has done some producing, also released a solo album titled KingsQueens in 2003 on Northern Records and a followup Two Ghosts in 2020.

== Discography ==
=== Full-length albums ===
- The Neverland Sessions (1992)
- Shawl (1993)
- Mercury (1995)

=== EPs ===
- 4 Song Demo (1990)
- Whirlpool (1992)
- Live (4-song version) (1994)
- Live (8-song version) (1994)
- Live at CBGB's (2005)

=== Singles (7-inch vinyl) ===
- Shine (1992)
- Crawl/Like I Was (1993)

=== Two-disc sets ===
- Mercury & Mercurios Tin: Limited Edition Collector's Set (1995)
- So Close...Yet So Far (Retrospective & B-sides) (1998)

=== Double vinyl ===
- Mercury (20th anniversary re-release) (2015)

=== Compilations ===
- Antarctica (1996)
- Live at the Strand (1997)
- A Live Tribute Recording for Gene Eugene (2000)
- Here Comes the Rust (retrospective) (2003)
