= Northern Records =

US independent record label

- Parent company: Sony BMG
- Founded: 1999; 26 years ago
- Founder: Jeff Anderson
- Distributor: RED Distribution
- Genre: Indie
- Country of origin: U.S.
- Location: California
- Official website: northernrecords.com

Northern Records is an independent record label in California. It was founded in 1999 and is distributed in the United States and Canada by RED Distribution (Sony BMG).

== Releases ==
Artist	Title	Release date	Code
CUSH	Self-titled Full-length	Jul '00	NRCD0001
The Violet Burning	Demonstrates Plastic and Elastic	Apr '01	NRCD0002
Honey	Three	Oct '01	NRCD0003
Frank Lenz	The Hot Stuff	Oct '01	NRCD0004
The Gravity Show	Fabulous Like You	Oct '01	NRCD0005
The Billions	Never Felt This Way Before	Jul '02	NRCD0006
CUSH	Spirituals EP 1	Jan '03	NRCD0007
Michael Knott	Hearts of Care	Jul '02	NRCD0008
Wayne Everett	KingsQueens	Jul '02	NRCD0009
The Violet Burning	This Is the Moment	Jul '02	NRCD0010
Northern Records	Sampler One	Sep '02	NRCD0011
Shepard	Committing to Tape	Apr '03	NRCD0012
All Things Bright and Beautiful	Love and Affection	May '03	NRCD0013
CUSH	Spirituals EP 2	Jun '03	NRCD0014
Holly Nelson	Leaving the Yard	Apr '03	NRCD0015
Sam	Miracles	Jul '03	NRCD0016
Monarch	The Grandeur That Was Rome	Feb '04	NRCD0017
CUSH	Live and Rare	Jun '03	NRCD0018
Michael Pritzl	Hollow Songs	Jul '03	NRCD0019
They Sang As They Slew	Get Well	Oct '03	NRCD0020
The Lassie Foundation	Face Your Fun	Mar '04	NRCD0021
The Billions	Trash and Treasure	Jun '04	NRCD0022
Kelly Ruppe	Sweet Love	Oct '04	NRCD0023
Luxury	Health and Sport	May '05	NRCD0024
Kevin Max	The Imposter	Oct '05	NRCD0025
Kevin Max	Holy Night	Dec '05	NRCD0026
The Violet Burning	Drop Dead	Feb '06	NRCD0027
Quiet Company	Shine Honesty	Mar '06	NRCD0028
The Lassie Foundation	Through and Through	Apr '06	NRCD0029
Hundred Year Storm	Only When it is Dark Enough Can You See the Stars	May '06	NRCD0030
Wilderness of Tekoa	The Skies Pale in Comparison	Jun '06	NRCD0031
Monarch	Lowly	Oct '07	NRCD0032
They Sang as They Slew	The Resistance	Aug '08	NRCD0033
Set to Sea	The Last Solid Ground	Feb '09	NRCD0034
Set to Sea	The Dark Has Found a Home In Me	Mar '10	NRCD0035
Telegram	Futuro	Nov '11	NRCD0036
CUSH	SP3	May '14	NRLP001

== See also ==
- List of record labels
- RED Distribution
- Sony BMG
