= List of songs recorded by Washington Phillips =

These are lists of all the songs recorded by the gospel blues musician Washington Phillips (1880–1954), arranged both in alphabetical order of title and by recording date. Additional information is given in parentheses.

== Alphabetic list ==
- "A Mother's Last Word to Her Daughter" (December 2, 1929 Dallas, TX; Columbia 14511-D). This song shares tune and chorus with "Bye and Bye I'm Goin' to See the King" by Blind Willie Johnson
- "Denomination Blues – Part 1" (December 5, 1927 Dallas, TX; Columbia 14333-D)
- "Denomination Blues – Part 2" (December 5, 1927 Dallas, TX; Columbia 14333-D)
- "I Am Born to Preach the Gospel" (December 4, 1928 Dallas, TX; Columbia 14448-D)
- "I Had a Good Father and Mother" (December 2, 1929 Dallas, TX; Columbia 14566-D)
- "I've Got the Key to the Kingdom" (December 2, 1929 Dallas, TX; Columbia 14511-D)
- "Jesus Is My Friend" (December 5, 1928; Dallas, TX; Columbia 14404-D)
- "Lift Him Up That's All" (December 2, 1927 Dallas, TX; Columbia 14277-D)
- "Mother's Last Word to Her Son" (December 2, 1927 Dallas, TX; Columbia 14369-D)
- "Paul and Silas in Jail" (December 2, 1927 Dallas, TX; Columbia 14369-D)
- "Take Your Burden to the Lord and Leave It There" (December 2, 1927 Dallas, TX; Columbia 14277-D)
- "Train Your Child" (December 4, 1928 Dallas, TX; Columbia 14448-D)
- "The Church Needs Good Deacons" (December 2, 1929 Dallas, TX; Columbia 14566-D)
- "The World Is in a Bad Fix Everywhere – Part 1" (December 2, 1929 Dallas, TX; unreleased, thought to be lost)
- "The World Is in a Bad Fix Everywhere – Part 2" (December 2, 1929 Dallas, TX; unreleased, thought to be lost)
- "What Are They Doing in Heaven Today" (December 5, 1928 Dallas, TX; Columbia 14404-D)
- "You Can't Stop a Tattler – Part 1" (December 2, 1929 Dallas, TX; unreleased at the time)
- "You Can't Stop a Tattler – Part 2" (December 2, 1929 Dallas, TX; unreleased at the time)

== Alphabetic list by recording date ==
December 2, 1927 – Dallas, TX

- "Lift Him Up That's All" (Columbia 14277-D)
- "Mother's Last Word to Her Son" (Columbia 14369-D)
- "Paul and Silas in Jail" (Columbia 14369-D)
- "Take Your Burden to the Lord and Leave It There" (Columbia 14277-D)

December 5, 1927 – Dallas, TX

- "Denomination Blues – Part 1" (Columbia 14333-D)
- "Denomination Blues – Part 2" (Columbia 14333-D)

December 4, 1928 – Dallas, TX

- "I Am Born to Preach the Gospel" (Columbia 14448-D)
- "Train Your Child" (Columbia 14448-D)

December 5, 1928 – Dallas, TX

- "Jesus Is My Friend" (Columbia 14404-D)
- "What Are They Doing in Heaven Today" (Columbia 14404-D)

December 2, 1929 – Dallas TX

- "A Mother's Last Word to Her Daughter" (Columbia 14511-D)
- "I Had a Good Father and Mother" (Columbia 14566-D)
- "I've Got the Key to the Kingdom" (Columbia 14511-D)
- "The Church Needs Good Deacons" (Columbia 14566-D)
- "The World Is in a Bad Fix Everywhere – Part 1" (unreleased, thought to be lost)
- "The World Is in a Bad Fix Everywhere – Part 2" (unreleased, thought to be lost)
- "You Can't Stop a Tattler – Part 1" (unreleased at the time)
- "You Can't Stop a Tattler – Part 2" (unreleased at the time)
