= Late (The 77s album) =

Studio album by The 77s
- Released: 2000
- Recorded: Audio Voyage; Audio Production Group; 12 Tone Studios; Le' Oignon; Paradise Studio; Plaid Jacket; Spray Bomb
- Genre: Rock
- Label: Fools of the World
- Producer: The 77s

The 77s chronology
ep (1999)	Late (2000)	A Golden Field of Radioactive Crows (2001)

Late is the title of The 77s' eleventh album, released in 2000 on the band's own Fools of the World label.

== Track listing ==
1. "Unbalanced"
2. "Sevens"
3. "The Years Go Down"
4. "Best I Had"
5. "Blue Sky"
6. "Related (Unreleased Jacked Version)"
7. "Mr. Magoo (Alternate Mix)"
8. "Flowers In The Sand (Alternate Mix)"
9. "Outskirts (Alternate Mix)"
10. "You Still Love Me (Alternate Mix)"
11. "Honey Run (Instrumental Mix)"
12. "Shotgun Angel" (Bill Sprouse, Jr Cover)
13. "Go With God, But Go" (Live/Unreleased)
14. "Perfect Blues" (Live/Unreleased)
15. "Dave's Blues" (Live/Unreleased)
16. "Denomination Blues" (Live/Unreleased)

== The band ==
- Mike Roe - guitars and lead vocals.
- Mark Harmon - bass guitars and background vocals.
- Bruce Spencer - Drums, percussion and vocals.

== Additional musicians ==
- Carey Avery: Percussion on "Outskirts".
- Live tracks feature David Leonhardt on guitar & Brian Myers on percussion.

== Production notes ==
- "Go With God, But Go" recorded live at the Canal Street Tavern in Dayton, Ohio October 15, 1997.
- "Perfect Blues" recorded live at Christ's Church, UCC in St Louis, Missouri November 5, 1997.
- "Dave's Blues" recorded at Mt. Vernon Nazarene College in Mt. Vernon, Ohio October 8, 1997. *"Denomination Blues" recorded at Madison's Cafe in Seattle, Washington November 5, 1997.
