= A Golden Field of Radioactive Crows =

Studio album by The 77s
- Released: 2001
- Studio: Le' Oignon, Spray Bomb
- Genre: Rock
- Label: Fools of the World/Galaxy21 Music
- Producer: The 77s

The 77s chronology
Late (2000)	A Golden Field of Radioactive Crows (2001)	Direct (2002)

Professional ratings
Review scores
Source	Rating
AllMusic	3/5 stars

A Golden Field of Radioactive Crows is the title of The 77s' twelfth album, released in 2001 on the band's own Fools of the World label, with distribution through Galaxy21 Music.

== Track listing ==
1. "Genuine"
2. "Down From You"
3. "U R Trippin'"
4. "One More Time"
5. "Rise"
6. "Leaving"
7. "Mr. Magoo"
8. "Related"
9. "I've Got"
10. "There Forever"
11. "Mean Green Season"
12. "Begin"

== Personnel ==
The band

- Mike Roe – guitars and lead vocals
- Mark Harmon – bass guitars and background vocals
- Bruce Spencer – drums, percussion and vocals

Production

- Scott Reams – additional production, inspiration, technical wizardry and percussion
- Brian Heydn – art and design, art direction
- The 77s – art direction
- Chris Knight – photography
- Ralph Stover – mixing and mastering
