= Pray Naked =

Studio album by The 77s
- Released: 1992
- Genre: Rock
- Label: Brainstorm Artists, Intl
- Producer: The 77s

The 77s chronology
Eighty Eight (1991)	Pray Naked (1992)	Drowning with Land in Sight (1994)

Pray Naked (a.k.a. The Seventy Sevens) is the title of The 77s' sixth album, released in 1992 on the Brainstorm Artists, Intl label.

This was the band's first album after reforming with members of The Strawmen. Without consulting with the band, Brainstorm (or its parent company, Word Records) altered the packaging and marketing of the album, which was issued without a title (making it the second album by the band entitled simply "The Seventy Sevens") and with the title track's name blacked out in order to avoid offense in the conservative Christian music marketplace of which Brainstorm was a part. However, a short spoken word segment on Side Two still refers to the album as Pray Naked. Most 77s fans still call the record by its intended title, and the band has also been known to "retitle" the CD when signing autographs.

The album was listed at No. 81 in the 2001 book, CCM Presents: The 100 Greatest Albums in Christian Music. In 2017, the album was reissued on CD and vinyl by Lo-Fidelity Records.

== Track listing ==
1. "Woody"
2. "Smiley Smile"
3. "Phony Eyes"
4. "Kites Without Strings"
5. "Happy Roy"
6. "Deep End"
7. "The Rain Kept Falling In Love"
8. "Holy Hold"
9. "Look"
10. "Nuts For You"
11. "Pray Naked"
12. "Self-Made Trap"

== The band ==
- Mike Roe on guitars and lead vocals.
- David Leonhardt on guitars.
- Mark Harmon on bass guitars and background vocals.
- Aaron Smith on Drums.

== Additional musicians ==
- Bongo Bob Smith on percussion
- Roger Smith on Piano.
