= Tom Tom Blues =

Studio album by The 77s
- Released: 1995
- Studio: Plaid Jacket; Paradise Studio
- Genre: Rock
- Label: Brainstorm Artists, Intl
- Producer: The 77s

The 77s chronology
Drowning with Land in Sight (1994)	Tom Tom Blues (1995)	Echos o' Faith (1996)

Professional ratings
Review scores
Source	Rating
AllMusic	1.5/5 stars

Tom Tom Blues is the title of The 77s' eighth album, released in 1995 on the Brainstorm Artists, Intl label.

== Track listing ==
1. "Rocks In Your Head"
2. "Honesty"
3. "You Still Love Me"
4. "Outskirts"
5. "Flowers In the Sand"
6. "Don't Leave Me Long"
7. "Gravy Train"
8. "Five In the Nave"
9. "Earache"
10. "Deliverance"

== Personnel ==
The band

- Mike Roe – guitars, lead vocals
- Mark Harmon – bass guitar, background vocals
- Bruce Spencer – drums

Additional musicians

- Carey Avery – percussion

Production notes

- Gene Eugene – executive producer
- Ojo Taylor – executive producer
- Guy Niosi – engineer, mixing
- John Flanagan – engineer, mixing
- Rachel Thornton – cover illustration Ashley Sad, Avery Happy – oil on canvas, 1988
