= EP (The 77s EP) =

EP by The 77s
- Released: 1999
- Studio: Audio Voyage, Audio Production Group, 12 Tone Studios
- Genre: Rock
- Label: Fools of the World
- Producer: The 77s

The 77s chronology
Echos O' Faith (1996)	EP (1999)	Late (2000)

Professional ratings
Review scores
Source	Rating
HM Magazine	(not rated) link

EP is an EP by American rock band the 77s released in 1999 on the band's own Fools of the World label.

== Track listing ==
1. "The Years Go Down"
2. "Sevens"
3. "Unbalanced"
4. "Blue Sky"
5. "The Best I Have"

== Personnel ==
- Mike Roe - guitar, lead vocals
- Mark Harmon - bass guitar, background vocals
- Bruce Spencer - drums

== Production notes ==
- Executive Producers: Curt and Debbie Cosenza
- Engineers: Brad Barth, Jerry Jennings & Ralph Stover
- Mixed and mastered - Ralph Stover
- Art direction - Roe/Harmon
- Art & design - Brian Heydn
