= Holy Ghost Building =

Studio album by The 77s
- Released: 2008
- Genre: Rock
- Label: Fools of the World/Lo-Fidelity
- Producer: The 77s, Mike Beidler (executive producer)

The 77s chronology
Direct (2002)	Holy Ghost Building (2008)

Professional ratings
Review scores
Source	Rating
Phantom Tollbooth	5/5 stars
Christianity Today	4/5 stars

Holy Ghost Building is a 2008 album by the Sacramento-based rock band The 77s.

== Track listing ==
1. "I'm Working on a Building"
2. "Keep Your Lamps Trimmed and Burning"
3. "Stranger, Won't You Change Your Sinful Ways"
4. "I'll Remember You, Love, in My Prayers"
5. "You're Gonna Be Sorry"
6. "What Would You Give in Exchange for Your Soul"
7. "He's a Mighty Good Leader"
8. "When My Blue Moon Turns to Gold Again"
9. "Everybody Ought to Pray Sometime"
10. "City of Refuge"
11. "A Lifetime Without You"

== Personnel ==
- Mike Roe – vocals, guitar
- David Leonhardt – guitar
- Mark Harmon – bass
- Bruce Spencer – drums
