= Scenic Routes =

Studio album by Lost Dogs
- Released: 1992
- Studios: The Mixing Lab 'B', Huntington Beach, California
- Genre: Roots music
- Label: BAI
- Producers: Terry Scott Taylor; Gene Eugene; Derri Daugherty; Mike Roe

Lost Dogs chronology
Scenic Routes (1992)	Little Red Riding Hood (1993)

Professional ratings
Review scores
Source	Rating
AllMusic	3/5 stars

Scenic Routes is an album by roots music band Lost Dogs, released on BAI Records in 1992.

The album began as a one time recording effort from the frontmen of four creative rock bands; Gene Eugene, from the funk/rock band, Adam Again; Terry Scott Taylor, from the bands Daniel Amos and The Swirling Eddies; Mike Roe, from the rock band The 77s; and Derri Daugherty, from the atmospheric rock band The Choir.

== Track listing ==
1. "Scenic Routes" (Words by Taylor, Music by Daugherty) (2:28)
2. "You Gotta Move" (Traditional, Arranged by Roe) (3:53)
3. "Built For Glory, Made To Last" (Taylor) (5:28)
4. "Bullet Train" (Taylor) (5:23)
5. "The Fortunate Sons" (Words by Eugene/Taylor, Music by Eugene) (4:36)
6. "The New Physics" (Roe/Mascoli) (4:05)
7. "I Am A Pilgrim" (Traditional, Arranged by The Lost Dogs) (3:40)
8. "Lord Protect My Child" (Bob Dylan, Arranged by the Lost Dogs) (4:53)
9. "Amber Waves Goodbye" (Taylor) (3:53)
10. "Bush League" (Words by Eugene/Taylor, Music by Eugene) (1:53)
11. "Old And Lonesome" (Roe, Adapted from Jimmy Reed's "Cold and Lonesome") (4:53)
12. "I Can't Say Goodbye" (Eugene) (5:00)
13. "Why Is The Devil Red?" (The Lost Dogs) (2:51)
14. "Smokescreen" (Roe) (2:27)
15. "The Last Testament of Angus Shane" (Words by Taylor, Music by Eugene) (4:09)
16. "Hard Times Come Again No More" (Stephen Foster, Arranged by The Lost Dogs) (2:13)
17. "Breathe Deep" (Taylor) (3:33)

== The band ==
- Derri Daugherty — guitars and vocals
- Gene Eugene — guitars, piano and vocals
- Mike Roe — guitars and vocals
- Terry Scott Taylor — guitars and vocals

== Additional musicians ==
- Burleigh Drummond — drums and percussion
- Greg Kellog — dobro, banjo and pedal steel
- James Sitterly — violin

== Production notes ==
- Most of the music on this album was recorded during two weekends in October 1991, played live in the lounge of Mixing Lab 'B', in Huntington Beach, California.
- The vocals and a few overdubs were recorded in January 1992 at McCrummy Studio in Whittier, California.
- It was mixed later in the month at Mixing Lab 'A' in Garden Grove, California and at Pakaderm Studio 'A' in Los Alamitos, California.
- Engineered by Gene, with Rob Watson, Terry and Derri.
- Art Direction and all photography by Anna Cardenas.
- Art Production and Layout by FineGraphics.
