= List of Christian record labels =

This is a list of notable Christian music record labels. Also see Category:Christian record labels

== List ==
=== 0-9 ===
- 5 Minute Walk
- 7Spin Music

=== A ===
- Alarma Records
- Alternative Records
- Angelophone Records
- Ardent Records

=== B ===
- BEC Recordings
- Benson Records
- Bethel Music
- Bibletone Records
- Broken Records
- Beach Street Records
- Blood and Ink Records

=== C ===
- Canaan Records
- Capitol Christian Music Group (formerly EMI CMG)
  - Capitol CMG Canada
- Centricity Music
- Chapel Records
- Christian Faith Recordings
- Credential Recordings
- Cross Movement Records
- Curb Records

=== D ===
- Diamante Music Group

=== E ===
- Essential Records
- Exit Records

=== F ===
- Facedown Records
- Fair Trade Services (formerly INO Records)
- Fervent Records
- Flicker Records
- Floodgate Records
- ForeFront Records
- Frontline Records

=== G ===
- Gotee Records
- Grapetree Records
- GospoCentric Records

=== H ===
- Hillsong Music
- Home Sweet Home Records

=== I ===
- Inpop Records
- Integrity Music

=== K ===
- KMG Records

=== L ===
- Lamon Records
- Loveworld Records
- Light Records

=== M ===
- Maranatha! Music
- Mono vs Stereo
- Myrrh Records
- Malaco Records

=== N ===
- Northern Records

=== P ===
- Pamplin Music
- Peacock Records
- Provident Label Group

=== R ===
- Reach Records
- Red Hammer Records
- Refuge Records
- Reunion Records
- Rocketown Records

=== S ===
- Sixstepsrecords
- Slanted Records
- Solid State Records
- Sonorous Entertainment
- Sparrow Records
- Spring Hill Music Group (formerly Chapel Hill Music Group)
- Star Song Communications

=== T ===
- Tate Music Group
- Tooth & Nail Records
- Tyscot Records

=== V ===
- Verity Records
- Vineyard Records UK

=== W ===
- Warner Alliance until 2018
- Word Records

== See also ==
- List of record labels
