= The Lost Cabin and the Mystery Trees =

Studio album by Lost Dogs
- Released: 2006
- Studio: Neverland Studios, Nashville, Tennessee
- Genre: Roots music
- Label: Fools of the World
- Producer: Terry Scott Taylor; Derri Daugherty; Mike Roe; Steve Hindalong

Lost Dogs chronology
Island Dreams (2005)	The Lost Cabin and the Mystery Trees (2006)	We Like To Have Christmas (2007)

The Lost Cabin and the Mystery Trees is an album by Roots music band Lost Dogs, released on Fools of the World records in 2006.

In a review for Christianity Today, Breimeier said the album was "a return to and improvement on the playfully upbeat country pop and rock that characterized Lost Dogs’ earlier albums".

== Track listing ==
1. "Broken Like Brooklyn" (Taylor)
2. "Devil's Elbow" (Taylor)
3. "The Lost Cabin and the Mystery Trees" (Taylor)
4. "Whispering Memories" (Daugherty/Hindalong)
5. "One More Day" (Roe)
6. "This Business Is Goin' Down" (Taylor)
7. "Hardening My Heart" (Taylor)
8. "Only One Bum In Corona del Mar" (Taylor)
9. "Get Me Ready" (Taylor)
10. "Burn It Up" (Daugherty/Hindalong)
11. "That's Where Jesus Is" (Taylor)

== Personnel ==
- Derri Daugherty — vocals, guitar, and bass
- Steve Hindalong — drums, percussion, harp, and glockenspiel
- Mike Roe — vocals, guitar, and bass
- Terry Scott Taylor — vocals and guitar

=== Additional musicians ===
- Jerry Chamberlain — background vocal on "Get Me Ready"
- Tim Chandler — bass
- Shane & Chance Daugherty — background vocals on "Corona Del Mar"
- Matt Slocum — pedal steel

== Production notes ==
- Recorded and mixed by Derri Daugherty at Sled Dog, Franklin, Tennessee
- Mastered by Richard Dodd, Nashville, Tennessee
- Additional Recording by Mark Harmon at the Harm Farm, Loomis, California ("One More Day")
- Cover illustrations & Photography by: Jimmy Abegg (Jimmy Industries)
- Design Assembled by Brian Heydn (SpireHouse Design Studio).
