= Lo-Fidelity Records =

Record label

Lo-Fidelity Records is a record label founded in 2002 by Jeffrey Kotthoff.

Based in North Aurora, Illinois, Lo-Fidelity specializes in limited edition releases, special edition reissues, and DVDs for artists.

== Artists ==
The following have released albums (CD, vinyl) or DVDs through Lo-Fidelity.

- The 77s
- Altar Boys
- Adam Again
- Derri Daugherty
- The Lost Dogs
- at the close of every day
- Terry Scott Taylor
- Bill Mallonee & Vigilantes of Love
- Michael Roe
- Kerosene Halo
- Chris Taylor

== Label catalog ==
1. Adam Again - Ten Songs By Adam Again, Re-Release (2002)
2. The Lost Dogs - Green Room Serenade, Part Tour (2002)
3. Terry Scott Taylor - Songs for the Day After Christmas (2002)
4. Derri Daugherty - A Few Unfinished Songs EP (2003)
5. The Lost Dogs - The Lost Dogs... Via Chicago DVD (2003)
6. Bill Mallonee & Vigilantes of Love - Need To Bleed EP (2003)
7. at the close of every day - The Silja Symphony Limited Edition Vinyl (2004)
8. at the close of every day - Live In Amsterdam Limited Edition CD (2004)
9. The Lost Dogs - MUTT CD (2004)
10. The 77s - DVD retrospective DVD (2006)
11. Terry Scott Taylor - Songs for the Day After Christmas (limited edition re-release) EP (2006)
12. The Lost Dogs - Via Chicago (All We Left Unsaid) DVD/CD (2006)
13. The 77s - Ninety Nine (limited edition [40 produced] 4-track EP; of 1999 live performance) (2007)
14. The 77s - Ninety Nine Live CD (8 track CD expanded from 4 track EP for full production run) (2007)
15. The Lost Dogs - The Lost Dogs... Via Chicago (limited edition re-release) DVD (2007)
16. The Lost Dogs - We Like To Have Christmas Christmas CD (2007)
17. The 77s - Holy Ghost Building CD (2008)
18. Michael Roe - We All Gonna Face The Rising Sun CD (2009)
19. The 77s - Working On The Building Limited Edition CD (2009)
20. The 77s - catalog download project Digital (2010 & ongoing)
21. Michael Roe - catalog download project Digital (2010 & ongoing)
22. Kerosene Halo - Kerosene Halo CD (2011)
23. The Lost Dogs - It Came From The Basement DVD/CD (2011)
24. The 77s - Sticks And Stones + This Is The Way Love Was 2 CD expanded re-release (2012)
25. The 77s - Seeds And Stems limited edition bonus CD (2012)
26. The 77s - Echos O' Faith + Played Naked 2 CD expanded re-release (2012)
27. The 77s - Cornerstone Is Dead...Long Live Cornerstone 2 CD live release to commemorate the 77s playing at Cornerstone Festival (2012)
28. The 77s - Cornerstone Forever limited edition live bonus CD (2012)
29. The 77s - Pray Naked vinyl reissue, expanded CD reissue, "Naked & Unashamed" outtakes CD, "Watchnight Service" DVD (2017)

== See also ==
- List of record labels
