= I Am Born to Preach the Gospel =

Single by Washington Phillips
- Recorded: Dallas, Texas, December 4, 1928
- Genre: Gospel blues
- Length: 3:03
- Label: Columbia
- Songwriter(s): Washington Phillips (see text)
- Producer(s): Frank B. Walker

"I Am Born to Preach the Gospel" is a gospel song recorded in 1928 by Washington Phillips (1880–1954; vocals and zither) in gospel blues style. His recording is included in the soundtrack of the 2009 movie My Son, My Son, What Have Ye Done?.

In some other recordings, the song is titled "I Was Born to Sing the Gospel". The words "I Am" or "I Was" are sometimes omitted from those titles.

The song is likely to have been written by Phillips: it is concerned with a similar subject to his 1927 song "Denomination Blues", and has lyrical resemblances to it, including the striking phrase "educated fool". The singer compares his own experience:

I am born to preach the Gospel,
And I sure do love my job ...
I have never been to no college
And I didn't get a chance in school
But when Jesus Christ anointed me to preach the gospel
He sure didn't leave me no fool

with that of educated preachers; and with that of Nicodemus, who according to the John 3:1-21 was a ruler of the Jews who visited Jesus by night to learn from Him.

== Recordings and performances ==
- 1928 – Washington Phillips, 78prm single Columbia 14448-D
- 1988 – Marion Williams, "Born to Sing the Gospel" on the album Born to Sing the Gospel
- 1994 – Aretha Franklin, "I Was Born to Sing the Gospel" broadcast performance from the White House
- 1995 – Michael Hakanson-Stacy, "Born to Preach the Gospel" on the album Pearls & Stones
- 2013 – Michael Roe, digital download
