= Nazarene Crying Towel =

Studio album by Lost Dogs
- Released: 2003
- Studios: Planet of Tapes, Brentwood, Tennessee; Neverland Studios, Nashville, Tennessee
- Genre: Roots music
- Label: BEC
- Producers: Terry Scott Taylor; Derri Daugherty; Michael Roe; Phil Madeira

Lost Dogs chronology
Real Men Cry (2001)	Nazarene Crying Towel (2003)	Mutt (2004)

Professional ratings
Review scores
Source	Rating
AllMusic	2/5 stars

Nazarene Crying Towel is an album by roots music band Lost Dogs, released on BEC Records in 2003.

== Track listing ==
1. "Moses In the Desert" (Taylor/Roe) (2:32)
2. "There You Are" (Taylor/Roe) (3:08)
3. "Deeper In The Heart" (Taylor) (2:24)
4. "Come Down Here" (Roe) (2:52)
5. "Be My Hiding Place" (Taylor) (3:52)
6. "Jesus On The Shore" (Taylor) (2:18)
7. "Mercy Again" (Taylor) (2:12)
8. "Cry Out Loud" (Roe/Daugherty) (3:14)
9. "The Yearning" (Taylor) (3:04)
10. "Crushing Hand" (Taylor) (1:58)
11. "Home Again" (Taylor) (2:53)
12. "Darkest Night" (Taylor) (3:48)

== The band ==
- Derri Daugherty — guitars and vocals
- Mike Roe — guitars, bass, and vocals
- Terry Scott Taylor — guitars and vocals

== Additional musicians ==
- Tim Chandler — bass
- Steve Hindalong — percussion
- Dennis "The Foot" Holt — drums
- Phil Madeira — piano, dobro, lap steel, harmonium, percussion

== Production notes ==
- Recorded during the spring of 2002 @ Planet Of Tapes, Brentwood, Tennessee by Phil Madeira.
- Sweetened & Mixed during the summer of 2002 @ Neverland Studios, Brentwood, Tennessee by Derri Daugherty.
- Mastered during the fall of 2002 @ Audio Production Group, Orangevale, California by Ralph Stover.
- Art Direction @ Design by Brian Heydn.
- Photography by Amanda Feavel.
- Band photography by Dinah K. Kotthoff.
