= Old Angel =

Studio album by Lost Dogs
- Released: May 11, 2010
- Studio: Sled Dog Studio (Franklin, Tennessee)
- Genre: Blues rock, roots music
- Label: Fools of the World; Stunt
- Producer: Terry Scott Taylor; Derri Daugherty; Mike Roe; Steve Hindalong

Lost Dogs chronology
We Like to Have Christmas (2007)	Old Angel (2010)

Old Angel is a studio album by the roots music band Lost Dogs. It was released in 2010 on Fools of the World and Stunt Records. The songs were composed by the band while traveling down Route 66 in 2009, and recorded in Nashville.

== Track listing ==
1. "Israelites & Okies" (Taylor)
2. "Dancin' on the Devil's Elbow" (Taylor)
3. "Turn it Around" (Hindalong/Roe)
4. "The Glory Road" (Taylor/Flesch/Chandler)
5. "America's Main Street" (Taylor/Roe)
6. "Traveling Mercies" (Taylor/Daugherty)
7. "Dust in My Bowl" (Taylor)
8. "Pearl Moon" (Taylor)
9. "The World is Against Us" (Taylor)
10. "Wicked Guns" (Hindalong)
11. "Goodbye Winslow" (Daugherty/Taylor/Hindalong)
12. "Desert Flowers" (Daugherty/Taylor/Hindalong)
13. "Dead End Diner" (Taylor)
14. "Carry Me" (Hindalong/Daugherty)
15. "Old Angel" (Taylor)

== The band ==
- Derri Daugherty — vocals and guitar
- Steve Hindalong — drums, percussion, glockenspiel, and saw
- Mike Roe — vocals, guitar, and mandolin
- Terry Scott Taylor — vocals and guitar

== Additional personnel ==
- Banjo, Mandolin - Jimmy Abegg
- Bass - Tim Chandler
- Fiddle - Shad Cobb
- Keyboards, Accordion - Ben Shive
- Pedal Steel Guitar - Greg Kellogg
- Angelic Voice - Liesl Dromi
- Radio Preacher - Pastor Joe Daugherty (track 8)

== Production notes ==
- Producer - Lost Dogs
- Recorded By - Derri Daugherty, Mike Roe
- Mixed By - Derri Daugherty
- Recorded and Mixed at Sled Dog Studio, Franklin TN
- Additional recording at Dolce Hayes Mansion room 150, San Jose CA
- Mastered at Yes Master, Nashville, TN
- Mastered By - Jim DeMain
- Pro Tools Editing By - Erin Kaus
- Executive Producers - Beth Jahnsen, Glenn Miller, Linda Miller
- Art Direction & Design, Photography - Jimmy Abegg
- Design & Layout Assistance - Brian Heydn
