= Steve Scott (poet) =

British musician

- Born: 1951 (age 73–74); London, England
- Known for: poet, spoken word artist, and musician

Steve Scott (born 1951) is a poet, spoken word artist, and musician. His written work was published by PRIZM Magazine, Radix Magazine, Monolith:UK publications and STRIDE UK publications. His music was released on labels such as Exit Records (A&M Records) and Blonde Vinyl. Steve's unreleased Moving Pictures album was originally slated for Solid Rock Records.

Among other artists, he has worked with the 77s, Love Coma, Randy Stonehill, Steven Soles and Charlie Peacock. Conference and festival appearances include Cornerstone Festival, Greenbelt Festival, L'Abri Fellowship in England, Biola University, Bali Arts Conference, and Calvary Chapel Pastor's conference. He has toured in the Netherlands, Russia, the United Kingdom and the United States.

In the 1990s, Scott produced Crossing the Boundaries in collaboration with artist Gaylen Stewart. The multimedia presentation toured the United States. In September 2017, Steve announced the release of a new album "Cross My Heat", recorded over a period of eight years. This was followed by The Way Of The Sevenfold Secret in November 2023.

As of the mid-2020s, along with new studio work, an upcoming release of the previously unavailable Emotional Tourist LP (not the 2012 retrospective by the same name) was announced by Alternative Records. The long-awaited Solid Rock Records sessions were announced via fan mail as a future two-album set as well.

== Discography ==
Recording	Year	Label	Remarks
The Way Of The Sevenfold Secret	2023	Harding Street Assembly Lab	(from HSAL's Bandcamp page:) "Perhaps it was the global pandemic’s penchant for driving focus, or maybe it was self-directed study of various religious texts, but something stirred our favorite British expat toward a cycle based on a 1926 booklet by Lilias Trotter. “Secret” begins with a pair of set pieces that read like memories as much as they do poems. The remainder of the album works through seven movements (plus an epilogue) that mirror the Trotter’s writing."
Cross My Heat	2017	Harding Street Assembly Lab	(from HSAL's Bandcamp page:) ""Cross My Heat" is Scott's first release in nearly two decades (1998's "Crossing The Boundaries"). Difficult to categorize, these nine pieces blend Steve's penchant for life-reflecting prose & ethno-electronica."
Emotional Tourist: A Retrospective	2012	Arena Rock Recording Company	
Crossing the Boundaries	1998		A release of the recordings made for the multi-disciplinary, art project collaboration with Gaylen Stewart. It is all spoken word poetry on an electronic ambient background. The packaging features Gaylen Stewart's paintings.
More than a Dream	1997	Rad Rockers	A more melodic album akin to his earlier work. Includes music intended to be released as Moving Pictures through Larry Norman's company, Solid Rock Records.
We Dreamed that We Were Strangers	1996	Glow Records/ Rad Rockers	An ambient album with Scott's signature poetry/spoken word on top. Many of the poems were taken from his Boundaries series.
Empty Orchestra	1994	Twitch Records	An instrumental album whose title comes from the English translation of the Japanese word "karaoke".
The Butterfly Effect	1992	Blonde Vinyl	This album introduced Scott's music to a new generation. It featured ambient keyboards with samples from Scott's Asian travels with his spoken word performances of poetry based on said travels.
Magnificent Obsession	1990	Alternative Records	Produced by Charlie Peacock and featuring his talents on keyboard as well as Jimmy Abegg (Jimmy A), Bongo Bob Smith, and members of the 77's: Mike Roe, Aaron Smith, and Mark Tootle. This album included new songs, more melodic than his later spoken word efforts, as well as demos and unreleased material from the previous album Love in the Western World. Plus, it also includes music intended to be released as Moving Pictures through Larry Norman's company, Solid Rock Records.
Lost Horizon	1989	Alternative Records	This album was produced by Charlie Peacock, Steven Soles, and Mike Roe and features all three as additional musicians. There is some spoken word, but most of the material is sung.
Love in the Western World	1983	Exit Records	Steven Soles was involved in the production of this album. Rereleased on CD in 2000 by Millennium 8 Records.

== Contributions ==
Recording	Year	Label	Remarks
"Second Message"	2023		Contributed spoken word to album by Josh Rude.
"Nervous Systems 2"	2000		For a compilation CD titled We The Living: Volume Three.
"Nervous System"	1998		For a compilation CD titled Awaiting the Dawn.
Language of Fools	1995		Contributed spoken word to album by Love Coma.
The Sky Is Falling	1980		Contributed vocals to an album by Randy Stonehill.

== Publications ==
Title	Date	Publication	Remarks
"I’d walk a million miles for one of your smiles, Mona."	Summer 1996	PRISM Magazine	
"What’s the Frequency, Kenneth?"	1995	Overground Newsletter	
"Am I Really Here, or is it only Art?"	Spring 1994	Umbrella Magazine	
"What is the Mystery?"	Christmas 1992	Entire Vision Magazine	
"Small world, Hard Reality"	Fall 1992	Entire Vision Magazine	
"The color of my wings."	September 1992		Catalog essay for Dan Callis multimedia show, 'My words, your words,' which opened at the Riverside Art Gallery.
"Lost Steps/Drawing Conclusions," "Art and Prophetic Confrontation," and "Like A House on Fire."	Summer 1992	Artrageous	All three essays were included in the Cornerstone Books publication.
"The current crisis in Modern Art: What’s in it For You?"	Summer 1992	Third Way Magazine	Third Way is a UK publication.
"A Jar of Dead Flies: Cheap Grace and Lame Excuses in the Area of Christian Art."	April 1992	True News magazine	
"Cosmic Conflict"	September 1991	Voices at the Watering Places	Paper presented at the Bali Arts Conference, and later published in the anthology, Voices at the Watering Places.
"Signs and Wonders: The Poetry of David Jones."	Summer 1990	Radix Magazine	
"The Forgotten Language."	February 1990	ACM Journal	An essay on Postmodern Art, and a report on the Bali Arts Conference.
"Art, Mission and Incarnation."	Winter 1987	Radix Magazine	
"When Worlds Collide: The Novels of Shusaku Endo."	Summer 1985	Radix Magazine	Reprinted in Third Way Magazine in 1991.
"Figuratively Speaking: The Medieval Mystery Plays."	Spring 1984	Radix Magazine	
"Crying for a Vision: Modern Art and the Christian Artist."	March/April 1982	Radix Magazine	
"Inner Healing."	1981	The Spiritual Counterfeits Journal	Coauthored with Brooks Alexander.
"East Meets West: how much dialogue is possible?"	January/February 1981	Radix Magazine	

== Books ==
- Scott, Steve (22 February 2007). Gord Wilson (ed.). Crying for a Vision and Other Essays: The Collected Steve Scott Vol. One. Gord Wilson. p. 144. ISBN 978-1-4259-7754-2.
- Scott, Steve (December 2002). Like a House on Fire: Renewal of the Arts in a Postmodern Culture. Wipf & Stock Publishers. p. 144. ISBN 978-1-59244-114-3.
- Scott, Steve (1993). The St. Petersburg Fragment. Cornerstone Press. ISBN 0-940895-11-0.
- Scott, Steve (1991). Crying For a Vision. Stride. ISBN 1-873012-13-6.
- Scott, Steve (1990). The Boundaries, Volume 1: Afterimages - Asian Sections. Self Published.
