= Corona del Mar, Newport Beach =

Corona del Mar
- Community of Newport Beach
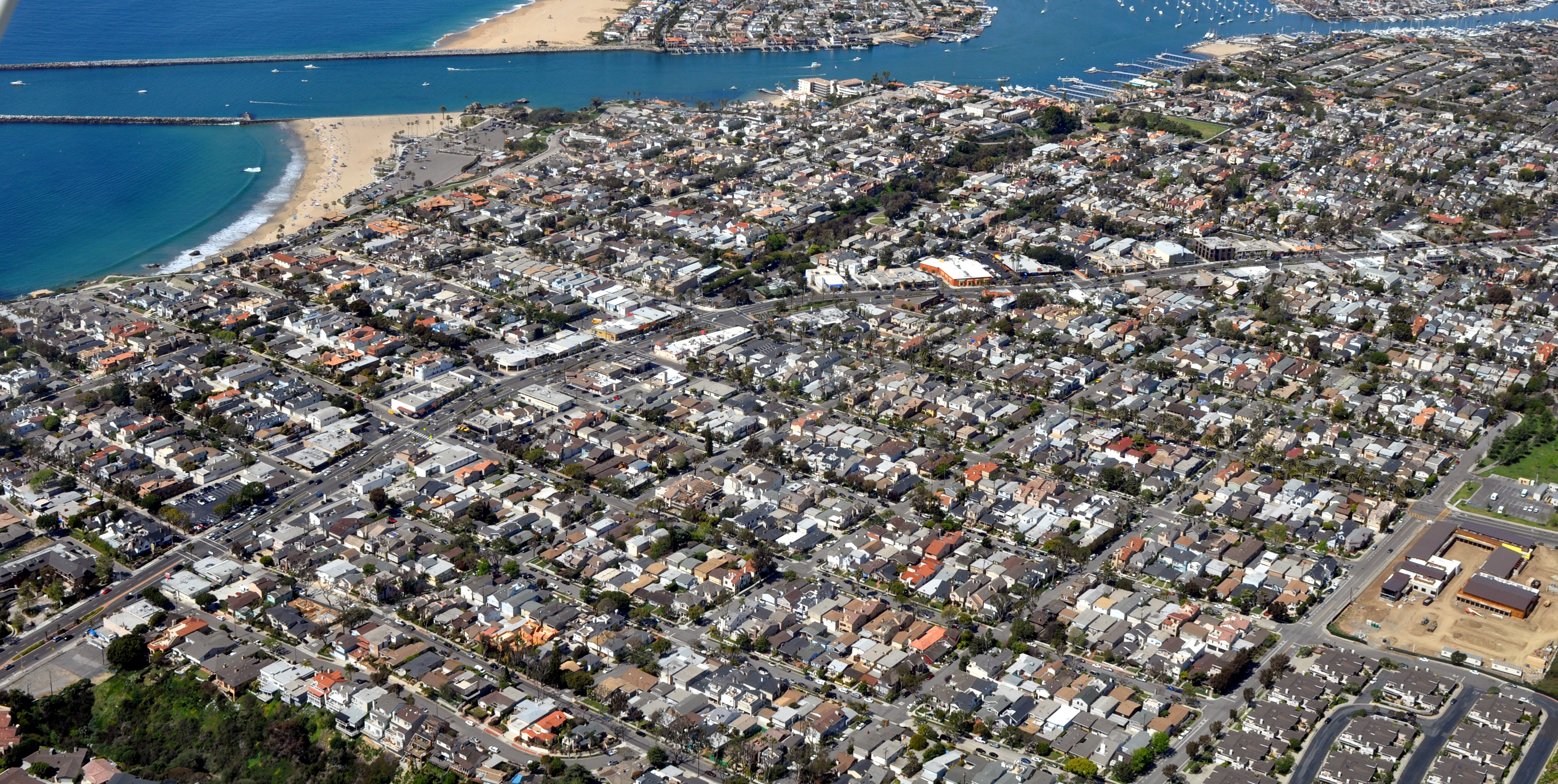
- Aerial view of Corona del Mar
- Interactive map of Corona del Mar
- Coordinates: 33.588633°N 117.878945°W
- Country: United States
- State: California
- County: Orange
- City: Newport Beach
- Time zone: UTC−8 (PST)
  - Summer (DST): UTC−7 (PDT)
- ZIP Code: 92625

Corona del Mar (Spanish for "Crown of the Sea") is a seaside neighborhood in the city of Newport Beach, California. It generally consists of all the land on the seaward face of the San Joaquin Hills south of Avocado Avenue to the city limits, as well as the development of Irvine Terrace, just north of Avocado. Corona del Mar is known for its beaches, tide pools, cliffside views and village shops. Beaches in the area include Corona del Mar State Beach and Crystal Cove State Park south of Corona del Mar. They are accessible by paths winding down a steep hillside. Corona del Mar has a representative to the Newport Beach City Council. Residents use a mailing address of Corona del Mar with the 92625 ZIP code.

== History ==
The Tongva village or landmark site of Moyongna was located at or near Corona del Mar. Some researchers have placed the location at the Newporter Inn, while others have disputed this location.

The region of Corona Del Mar was initially purchased for $150,000 by James Irvine in 1875. Almost 30 years later in 1904, the 700 acres of land was sold to Corona Del Mar's founder, George E. Hart. The community of Corona Del Mar grew to establish its own post office on July 16, 1926, with Mrs. Edna L. Stuckey assuming duties as the first postmistress. A development consisting of unsold land in Corona del Mar was established in 1915 and named Balboa Palisades.

The older area of Corona del Mar known as the Flower Streets consists mostly of closely spaced, free-standing, detached single-family houses of varying architecture, concentrated along Pacific Coast Highway (also known as "PCH" or State Route 1). Newer developments in Harbor View Hills consist of California ranch-style houses, many with expansive ocean views. Irvine Terrace is another neighborhood in Corona Del Mar located slightly north of Avocado, including a mix of newly developed homes as well as original mid-1950 homes many with views of Balboa Island and Newport harbor.

== Demographics ==
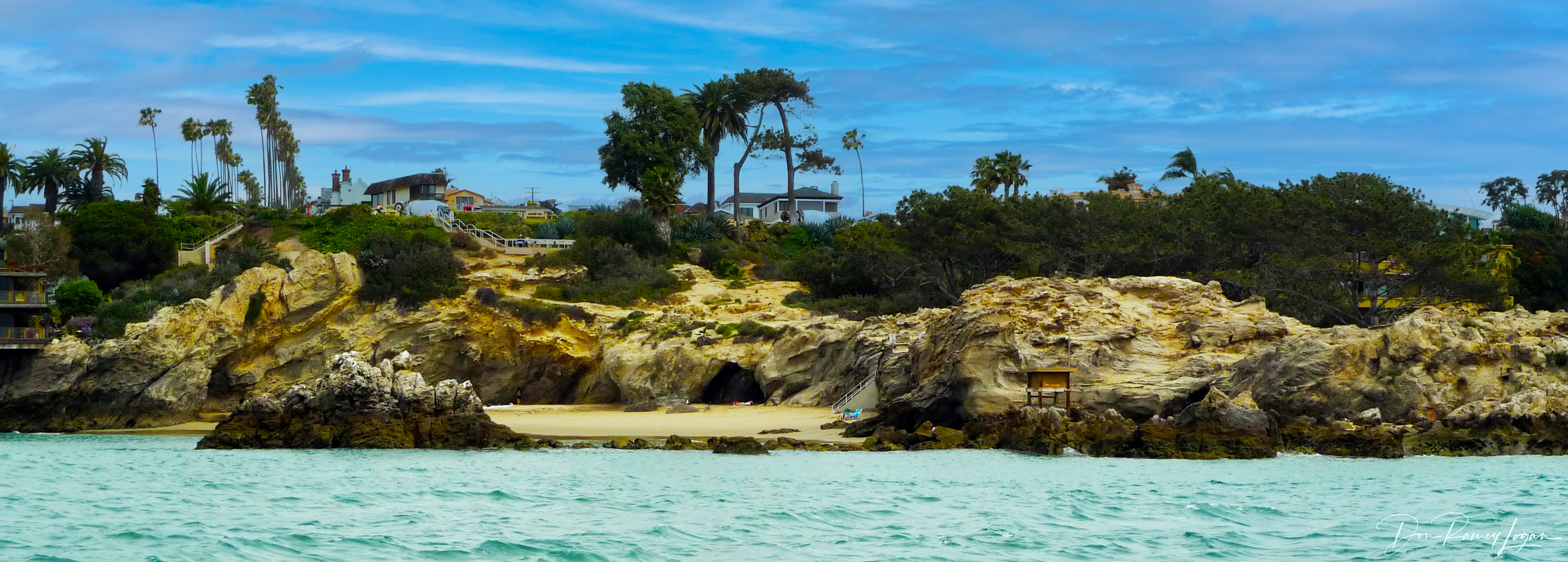
Corona del Mar Cliffs in Newport Beach

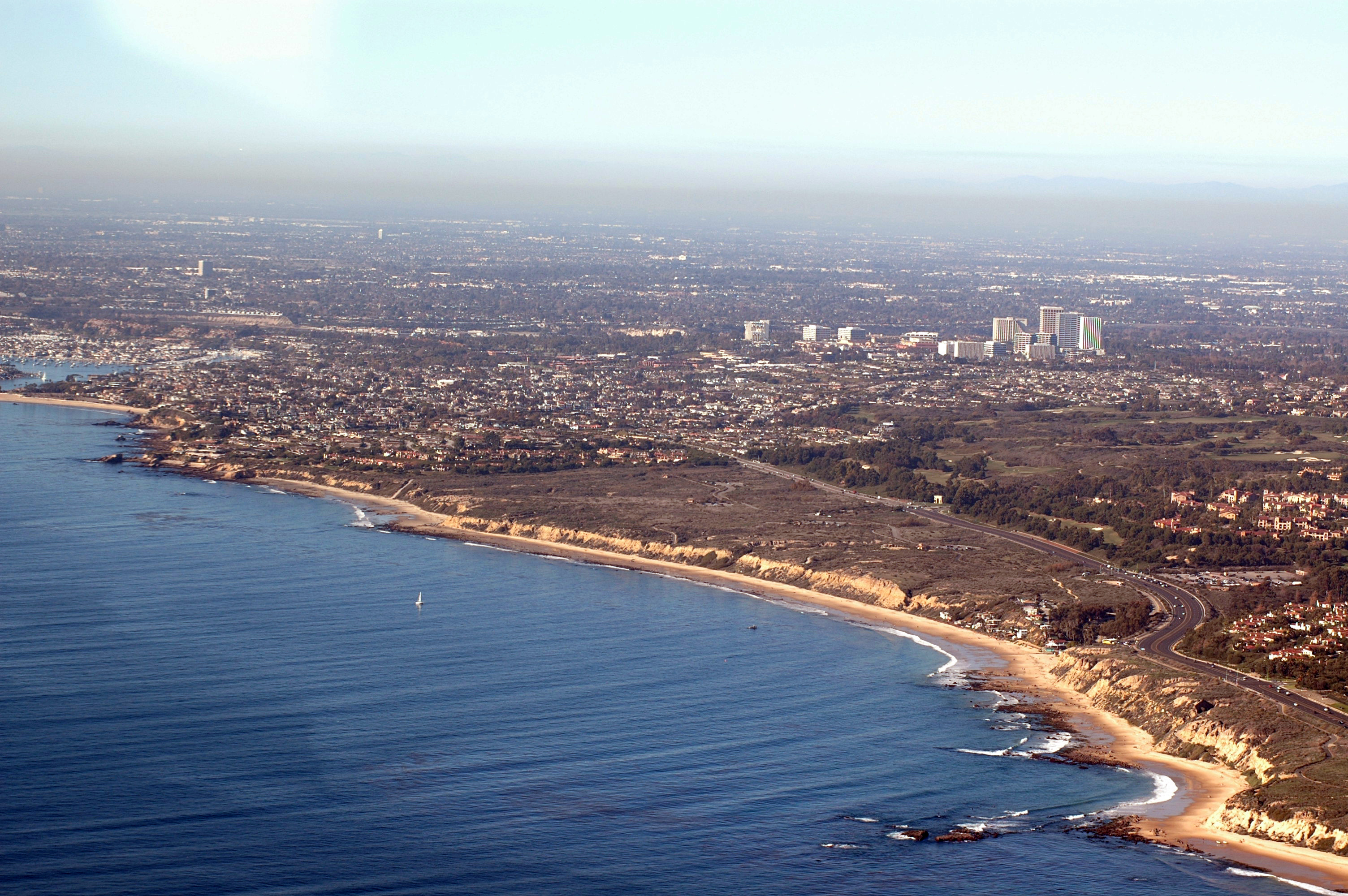
Corona del Mar, Newport Beach

As of the census of 2020, for Corona del Mar (zip code 92625), there were 12,017 people, 5,895 households, 3,602 families in the city. The population density was 5,174 per square mile (1,997.8/km^{2}). The racial makeup of the city was 85.5% White, 0.6% African American, 0.23% Native American, 6.0% Asian, 0.27% Pacific Islander, 3.7% from other races, and 3.5% from two or more races. Hispanic or Latino of any race were 8.9% of the population.

There were 6,885 households, out of which 18.5% had children under the age of 18 living with them, 52.3% were married couples living together, 4.7% were cohabiting couples, 16.8% had a male householder with no spouse or partner present, and 26% had a female householder with no spouse or partner present. The average household size was 2.23 with families accounting for 61% of households with the average family size of 2.81.

In the city the population was spread out, with 14.5% under the age of 18, 1.9% from 18 to 24, 204% from 25 to 44, 33.6% from 45 to 64, and 32.8% who were 65 years of age or older. The median age was 56.2 years. For every 100 females, there were 94.8 males. For every 100 females, there were 90.9 males.

The median income for a household in the city was $162,250. The per capita income for the city was $132,576. About 5.0% of families and 6% of the population were below the poverty line, including 1% of those under age 18 and 1.2% of those age 65 or over.

Corona del Mar High School is located in the neighborhood of Eastbluff.

== Points of interest ==
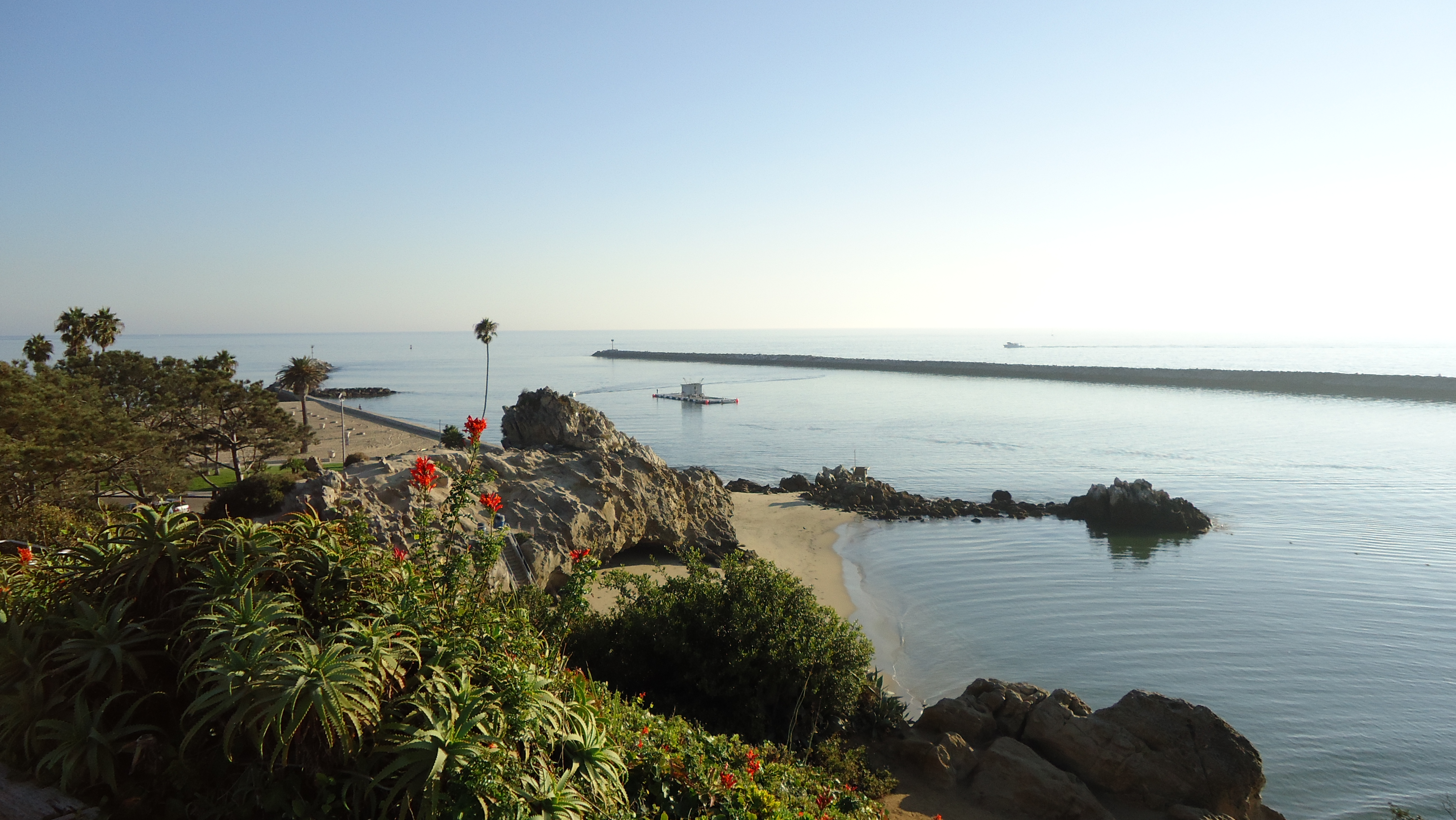
"Big Corona" Beach and Pirates Cove from Lookout Point

Corona Del Mar includes two state beaches: Big Corona Beach and Crystal Cove State Park is the larger of the two Corona Del Mar state beaches, stretching half a mile long. The botanical gardens at Sherman Library and Gardens have a wide range of flowers, vegetation, and a greenhouse. Other points of interest include:

- Fashion Island
- Crystal Cove State Park
- The Goldenrod Footbridge
- China Cove
- The Port Theater

== In popular culture ==
The Oscar-winning film, All Quiet on the Western Front, was filmed in Corona Del Mar.

It is the setting for the Fox series Arrested Development (mentioned by name in Season 2, Episode 14, "The Immaculate Election") as well as residence of Martine and Dustin Rhodes in the Dean Koontz novel False Memory.

The Lost Dogs mentioned Corona del Mar on their 2006 album, The Lost Cabin and the Mystery Trees, in the song "Only One Bum in Corona del Mar".

Main Beach in Corona del Mar served as the backdrop for part of the 2017 "Would You Ever" music video featuring Skrillex and Poo Bear.

The O.C. used places, such as Corona del Mar High School, in Corona del Mar as a reference point for the show.

Gilligan's Island was filmed at Pirate's Cove in Corona Del Mar.

Famous residents of Corona Del Mar have included Wayne Gretzky, Donna Reed, Rod Laver, Chuck Jones, Diane Keaton and James Brolin.

== Parking ==
Parking in Corona Del Mar is governed by Newport Beach parking policies except for at the state beaches. Many nonresidential areas have parking meters. Paid parking at the beach is allowed between 6 a.m. and 10 p.m.
