= Gift Horse =

Gift Horse may refer to:

- Gift Horse (album), by roots music band Lost Dogs
- Gift Horse (film), 1952 British film starring Trevor Howard and Richard Attenborough
- "Gift Horse", song by The Jealous Girlfriends from The Jealous Girlfriends (album)
- Gift Horse, sculpture by Hans Haacke positioned on the fourth plinth of Trafalgar Square, London, in 2015–2016

== See also ==
- "The Gift Horse", an episode of Frasier
- Trojan horse
