= The 77s (album) =

Studio album by The 77s
- Released: 1987
- Recorded: Exit Studios (Sacramento, California)
- Genre: Rock
- Label: Island
- Producer: Robert Musso

The 77s chronology
All Fall Down (1984)	The 77s (1987)	Sticks and Stones (1990)

Professional ratings
Review scores
Source	Rating
Allmusic	4.5/5 stars

The 77s is the third album by The 77s, released in 1987 on the Exit and Island Records labels.

The album contains the band's biggest hit single to date, which was "The Lust, The Flesh, The Eyes and the Pride of Life." Years later, the song would be covered by Roe's other band The Lost Dogs (on the album, MUTT), and the band 311 would even "borrow" a few lines from the song for one of their own singles.

The album was listed at No. 82 in the 2001 book, CCM Presents: The 100 Greatest Albums in Christian Music.

== Track listing ==
Side one

1. "Do It for Love"
2. "I Can't Get Over It"
3. "What Was in That Letter"
4. "Pearls Before Swine"

Side two

1. "The Lust, the Flesh, the Eyes & the Pride of Life"
2. "Frames Without Photographs"
3. "Don't Say Goodbye"
4. "Bottom Line"
5. "I Could Laugh"

CD bonus tracks†

1. "Do It For Love (Demo)
2. "I Can't Get Over It" (Live 8-track Demo)
3. "What Was in That Letter" (Live 8-track Demo)
4. "The Lust, the Flesh, the Eyes & the Pride of Life" (Live 8-track Demo)
5. "Frames Without Photographs" (Live 8-track Demo)
6. "Don't Say Goodbye" (Demo)
7. "MT" (Unreleased Alternative Mix)
8. "Don't, This Way" (Single Version)

† Bonus tracks originally found on CDs in the 123 boxset.

== Personnel ==
- Mike Roe – guitars, lead vocals
- Mark Tootle – keyboards, guitars, vocals
- Jan Eric – bass, backing vocals
- Aaron Smith – drums
