= Echos o' Faith =

Echoes O' Faith

Live album by The 77s
- Released: 1996
- Recorded: Echoes O' Faith
- Genre: Rock
- Label: Fools of the World
- Producer: Brian Healy

The 77s chronology
Tom Tom Blues (1995)	Echoes O' Faith (1996)	ep (1999)

Professional ratings
Review scores
Source	Rating
Allmusic	3/5 stars

Echoes O' Faith is the title of The 77s' second live album, released in 1996 on the band's own Fools of the World label. This album was recorded live at Echoes Of Faith Church in Ontario, California on November 28, 1992.

This performance was a rare acoustic "unplugged" performance of the 77s, which prompted producer Brian Healy to start recording. Everyone involved was happy enough with the overall sound of the recording that it was decided to make it into a live album.

== Track listing ==
1. "MT" (Mike Roe, Bob Smith) – 4:20
2. "Nowhere Else" (Mark Tootle) – 4:35
3. "Ba-Ba-Ba-Ba" (Gene Mascoli, Roe, Saterlee) – 5:39
4. "The Treasure In You" (Roe) – 4:03
5. "Hard To Say" (Bill Harmon, Mark Harmon) – 4:34
6. "The Rain Kept Falling In Love" (Roe) – 4:34
7. "Bottom Line" (Roe) – 4:29
8. "A Different Kind of Light" (Steve Scott) – 3:23
9. "The Lust, The Flesh, The Eyes & The Pride of Life (Roe) – 3:52
10. "Caught In An Unguarded Moment" (Mark Proctor, Mike Roe, Jan Eric Volz) – 3:54
11. "Do It For Love" (Steve Griffith, Tootle) – 4:40
12. "Look" (Harmon) – 3:41
13. "UUUU" (Roe) – 5:18
14. "Happy Roy" (David Leonhardt, Roe) – 4:10
15. "God Sends Quails" (Roe) – 5:50
16. "Kites Without Strings"

== Personnel ==
- Mike Roe - guitars, lead vocals
- Mark Harmon - bass, background vocals
- David Leonhardt - guitars, vocals
- Steve Hindalong - drums, percussion

== Production notes ==
Produced - Brian Healy

- Executive Producers – The 77s.
- Recorded by Pete Tessitore.
- Mixed by Don McKenney.
