= Aaron Smith (musician) =

American drummer (born 1950)

- Also known as: The A-Train
- Born: September 3, 1950 (age 76)
- Origin: Durham, North Carolina, U.S.
- Genres: Soul; new wave; Christian alternative rock
- Occupations: Drummer; percussionist
- Years active: 1970–present

Aaron "The A-Train" Smith (born September 3, 1950) is a Nashville-based drummer and percussionist who has played as a member of multiple bands, and as a studio musician, starting in 1970. Smith played drums on several hit Motown recordings in the 1970s, including The Temptations' "Papa Was a Rollin' Stone". In the 1980s, he was a member of the new wave band Romeo Void and the Christian alternative rock band the 77s.

== History ==
With a singular focus, Aaron Smith began his career playing drums in marching band during the sixth grade practicing using the cafeteria tables since there were so many kids wanting to play that instrument and not enough instruments available for all the students. Smith has stated that his influences include James Brown, Aretha Franklin, Stax, RCA, Motown, Ringo Starr and the Beatles' appearance on the Ed Sullivan Show. On his first recording session for the song "Push, Push", Smith was paid with "all the hamburgers he could eat".

At the age of 20, Smith played drums on The Temptations' recording of "Papa Was a Rollin' Stone" which reached No. 1 on the Billboard Hot 100. The song also won two Grammy Awards at the 15th Annual Awards ceremony - one for Best R&B Vocal Performance by a Duo, Group Or Chorus and the other for Best R&B Instrumental Performance. Although not formally a member of the Funk Brothers, he performed with them on several Motown albums as a part of the rhythm section. These records include Sky's the Limit (Temptations 71), Solid Rock (Temptations 71), All Directions (Temptations 72), Face to Face with the Truth (The Undisputed Truth 72), Masterpiece (73), The Temptations in Japan (Temptations 73), Keep on Trucking (Eddie Kendricks 73), Me and Rock and Roll Are Here to Stay (David Ruffin 74). He has also worked on Renaissance (Ray Charles 76), Prime Time (Grey And Hanks 80), A Girl In Trouble (Romeo Void 84). Smith was also a member of the progressive rock group Vector from 1983 through 1985.

In 1984, he joined the new wave group Romeo Void. Although his stint in the band was relatively brief (with the band breaking up the following year), he did perform on their most commercially successful single, "A Girl in Trouble (Is a Temporary Thing)" (along with the rest of the tracks on the accompanying Instincts album) and was even interviewed and invited back to perform with the group for their Bands Reunited episode. Also in 1984, Smith contributed to the 77s' album All Fall Down. He later joined the group officially in 1987, taking part in their albums The 77s (1987), Sticks and Stones (1990), Eighty Eight (1991), The Seventy Sevens (also known as Pray Naked - 1992), and Drowning with Land in Sight (1994) leaving the group in 1995.

Smith has also appeared on the following recordings: Simple House (Margaret Becker, 1991), Love Life (Charlie Peacock, 1991), Listen (Cindy Morgan, 1996), The Loving Kind (Cindy Morgan, 1998), Brother's Keeper (Rich Mullins, 1995), Hope Is Born Again (Jim Brickman/Point of Grace, 1997), The Jesus Record (Rich Mullins, 1998), Prayers of a Ragamuffin (A Ragamuffin Band, 2000), A Long Way Back (Kim Richey, 2020) and many more.

In his career, Smith has done many live tours as well with artists he has recorded with: Chuck Jackson, The Undisputed Truth, The Temptations, Mirosla Vitous, Club Nouveau, Miroslav Vitous, The 77's, Michael Card, Engelbert Humperdinck, Michael W. Smith, Charlie Peacock, Rich Mullins and Kevin Max.

An autographed pair of Smith's drumsticks, part of the Peter Lavinger collection which was on display in the Main Exhibition Level through Feb. 2002 at the Rock and Roll Hall of Fame, can be found next to a pair of sticks used by Ringo Starr, one of his early influences.

Smith is married and has two daughters.

== Selected discography ==
- Sky's the Limit, The Temptations, 1971 album
- Solid Rock, The Temptations, 1972 album
- All Directions, The Temptations, 1972 album
- Boogie Down!, Eddie Kendricks, 1972 album
- Masterpiece, The Temptations, 1973 album
- Law of the Land, The Undisputed Truth, 1973 album
- Down to Earth, The Undisputed Truth, 1974 album
- Mannequin Virtue, Vector, 1983 album
- Instincts, Romeo Void, 1984 album
- All Fall Down, The 77s, 1984 album
- The 77s, The 77s, 1987 album
- Special The Temptations, 1989 album
- Sticks and Stones, The 77s, 1990 album
- Eighty Eight, The 77s, 1991 album
- The Seventy Sevens, The 77s, 1992 album
- Drowning with Land in Sight, The 77s, 1994 album
- Emperors of Soul The Temptations, 1994 boxed set
- Brother's Keeper, Rich Mullins, 1995 album
- The Jesus Record, Rich Mullins, 1998 album
- Prayers of a Ragamuffin, A Ragamuffin Band, 2000 album
