= Drowning with Land in Sight =

Studio album by The 77s
- Released: 1994
- Studio: Mom's Sewing Room, Paradise Studio
- Genre: Rock
- Length: 55:07
- Label: Myrrh
- Producer: The 77s

The 77s chronology
Pray Naked (1992)	Drowning with Land in Sight (1994)	Tom Tom Blues (1995)

Professional ratings
Review scores
Source	Rating
AllMusic	2/5 stars

Drowning with Land in Sight is the seventh studio album by American rock band The 77s. It was released in 1994 on Myrrh Records. The music, their heaviest up to that point, ranged from the opening note-for-note Led Zeppelin cover to the straightforward Rolling Stones homage "Cold Cold Night" to Roy Orbison-influenced ballads "Film at 11", "The Jig Is Up", and "Alone Together". The lyrics primarily reflected the stress of singer Michael Roe's divorce, except for "Dave's Blues", about guitarist David Leonhardt's illness with cancer. At the record label's insistence, the final track was written and added to provide a more upbeat conclusion. Also, a vulgarity in "Dave's Blues" was backward masked into unintelligibility.

== Track listing ==
1. "Nobody's Fault but Mine"
2. "Snowblind"
3. "Snake"
4. "Indian Winter"
5. "Film at 11"
6. "Mezzo"
7. "Cold Cold Night"
8. "Dave's Blues"
9. "Sounds O' Autumn"
10. "The Jig Is Up"
11. "Alone Together"
12. "For Crying Out Loud"

== Personnel ==
The band

- Mike Roe on guitars and lead vocals.
- David Leonhardt on guitars.
- Mark Harmon on bass guitars and background vocals.
- Aaron Smith on Drums.

Production notes

- Gene Eugene – executive producer
- Ojo Taylor – executive producer
