= Sticks and Stones (The 77s album) =

Studio album by The 77s
- Released: 1990
- Studio: Exit Studios, Sacramento, California
- Genre: Rock
- Label: Broken
- Producer: Mike Roe, Steve Griffith

The 77s chronology
The 77s (1987)	Sticks and Stones (1990)	Eighty Eight (1991)

Professional ratings
Review scores
Source	Rating
AllMusic	4.5/5 stars

Sticks and Stones is the 77s' fourth album, released in 1990 on Broken Records.

The record is primarily a collection of previously recorded, unreleased songs.

The band's song "MT" was featured a number of times on the popular television series Beverly Hills, 90210.

== Track listing ==
All tracks written by Mike Roe, Mark Tootle, Jan Eric and Aaron Smith unless otherwise noted.

No.	Title	Writer(s)	Length
1.	"MT"	Bongo Bob Smith; Michael Roe	4:02
2.	"Nowhere Else"		4:18
3.	"This Is the Way Love Is"		5:11
4.	"Perfect Blues"	Mike Roe	6:11
5.	"Don't, This Way"		7:38
6.	"You Walked in the Room"		4:29
7.	"The Days to Come"		4:28
8.	"The Loop"		3:56
9.	"God Sends Quails"		6:40
10.	"Love Without Dreams"		5:01
11.	"Do It for Love"	Steve Griffith; Mark Tootle	3:16
12.	"The Lust, the Flesh, the Eyes and the Pride of Life"	Mike Roe	3:30
13.	"Pearls Before Swine"	Mike Roe	8:20
14.	"Bottom Line"	Mike Roe	5:51
Total length:			1:12:51

Tracks 11–14 are only available on the CD.

== Personnel ==
The band

- Mike Roe – guitar, lead vocals, producer
- Mark Tootle – keyboards, guitar, vocals
- Jan Eric – bass guitar, background vocals
- Aaron Smith – drums

Additional musicians

- Chris Hillman (of The Byrds) – mandolin, bass guitar, background vocals
- Steve Griffith – bass guitar
- Mark Harmon – bass guitar
- Steve Griffith – producer, recording engineer, mixing
- Daryl Zachman – recording engineer, mixing
