= Little Red Riding Hood (album) =

Studio album by Lost Dogs
- Released: 1993
- Studio: The Green Room, Huntington Beach, California
- Genre: Roots music
- Label: WAL
- Producer: Terry Scott Taylor; Gene Eugene; Derri Daugherty; Michael Roe

Lost Dogs chronology
Scenic Routes (1992)	Little Red Riding Hood (1993)	The Green Room Serenade, Part One (1996)

Professional ratings
Review scores
Source	Rating
AllMusic	4.5/5 stars

Little Red Riding Hood is an album by American roots music band Lost Dogs. It was released on WAL Records in 1993.

== Track listing ==
1. "No Ship Coming In" (Taylor) (3:56)
2. "Imagine That" (Words by Taylor/Daugherty, Music by Daugherty) (4:03)
3. "You Satisfy" (Roe) (4:06)
4. "Bad Indigestion" (Taylor) (3:25)
5. "Dunce Cap" (Words by Eugene/Taylor, Music by Eugene/Daugherty) (3:47)
6. "Jesus Loves You, Brian Wilson" (Roe) (3:16)
7. "Precious Memories" (Traditional) (3:10)
8. "Rocky Mountain Mines" (Taylor) (4:11)
9. "Jimmy" (Eugene) (2:49)
10. "Eleanor, It's Raining Now" (Taylor) (6:16)
11. "Free At Last" (Words by the Lost Dogs, Music by Roe) (4:58)
12. "Red, White and Blue" (Taylor) (2:44)
13. "I'm A Loser" (John Lennon/Paul McCartney) (2:51)
14. "No Room For Us" (Taylor) (4:11)
15. "Pray Where You Are" (Words by the Lost Dogs, Music by Taylor) (3:46)
16. On the Good Ship Lollipop (Richard A. Whiting/Sidney Clare) (1:06) (hidden track)

== Personnel ==
- Derri Daugherty — guitars, bass, and vocals
- Gene Eugene — guitars, piano, bass, and vocals
- Mike Roe — guitars, bass, harmonica, and vocals
- Terry Scott Taylor — guitars and vocals

=== Additional musicians ===
- Jerry Chamberlain — background vocals on "No Ship Coming In" and "Rocky Mountain Mines"
- Tim Chandler — bass on "Dunce Cap", "Eleanor, It's Raining Now" and "Pray Where You Are". Also on "Imagine That" (uncredited)

== Production notes ==
- Produced by Terry Scott Taylor, Gene Eugene, Derri Daugherty and Mike Roe.
- Executive Producers: Ojo Taylor and Gene Eugene.
- Recorded the Dogs way at The Green Room, Huntington Beach by Gene Eugene with David Hackbarth and Mark Rodriguez and the Dogs.
- Mixed at Mixing Lab, Garden Grove.
- Produced for the WAL by Brainstorm Productions.
- Art Direction, Design and Photography by Anna Cardenas.
- Additional Layout and Production by Ed McTaggart.
