= Christian alternative rock =

Alternative rock music lyrically grounded in a Christian worldview

- Stylistic origins: Alternative rock; Christian rock; contemporary Christian; Christian punk
- Cultural origins: Early 1980s, United States

Christian alternative rock is a form of alternative rock music that is lyrically grounded in a Christian worldview. Some critics have suggested that unlike CCM and older Christian rock, Christian alternative rock generally emphasizes musical style over lyrical content as a defining genre characteristic, though the degree to which the faith appears in the music varies from artist to artist.

== History ==
Christian alternative music has its roots in the early 1980s, as the earliest efforts at Christian punk and new wave were recorded by artists like Andy McCarroll and Moral Support, Undercover, the 77s, Steve Scott, Adam Again, Quickflight, Daniel Amos, Youth Choir (later renamed the Choir), Lifesavers Underground, Michael Knott, the Prayer Chain, Altar Boys, Breakfast with Amy, Steve Taylor, 4-4-1, David Edwards and Vector. Early labels, most now-defunct, included Blonde Vinyl, Frontline, Exit, and Refuge.

By the 1990s, many of these bands and artists had disbanded, were no longer performing, or were being carried by independent labels because their music tended to be more lyrically complex (and often more controversial) than mainstream Christian pop. The modern market is currently supported by labels such as Tooth & Nail, Gotee and Floodgate. These companies are often children of, or partially owned, by general market labels such as Warner, EMI, and Capitol Records, giving successful artists an opportunity to "cross over" into mainstream markets.

== See also ==
- 7ball
- HM: The Hard Music Magazine
- True Tunes News
