= Ralph Stover State Park =

State park in Bucks County, Pennsylvania

- Location within Pennsylvania Location within the United States
- Interactive map of Ralph Stover State Park
- Location: Bucks County, Pennsylvania, United States
- Coordinates: 40°26′04″N 75°05′53″W
- Area: 45 acres (18 ha)
- Elevation: 256 feet (78 m)
- Established: 1931
- Administrator: Pennsylvania Department of Conservation and Natural Resources
- Website: Official website
- Pennsylvania State Parks

Ralph Stover State Park is a Pennsylvania state park on 45 acres (18 ha) in Plumstead and Tinicum Townships, Bucks County, Pennsylvania in the United States. It is a very popular destination for whitewater kayaking on Tohickon Creek and rock climbing on High Rocks (Triassic sandstone of the Newark Group). Ralph Stover State Park is two miles (3.2 km) north of Point Pleasant near Pennsylvania Route 32.

== History ==
Tohickon Creek was named by the Lenape, some of the first inhabitants of the area. "To-Hick-Hanne" means "Deer-Bone-Creek". Ralph Stover State Park was the site of an 18th-century gristmill that was built on Tohickon Creek by the park's namesake, Ralph Stover. Remnants of the mill and mill race can still be seen near Tohickon Creek.

The Stover family gave their land to the Commonwealth of Pennsylvania in 1931. The recreational facilities were built during the Great Depression by the Federal Works Progress Administration created by U.S. President Franklin D. Roosevelt to provide work for the unemployed. Author James A. Michener donated the High Rocks area to the park in 1956. Although "High Rocks State Park" is listed in the United States Geological Survey Geographic Names Information System and the coordinates given in USGS GNIS are located here, it was never an official name according to the Pennsylvania Department of Conservation and Natural Resources or a separate park.

== Recreation ==
High Rocks is a 200-foot (60 m) sheer rock face, composed of smooth red Lockatong Formation argillite interspersed with friable Brunswick Formation shale. Since slippery and crumbly rock makes climbing somewhat difficult here, High Rocks is notable mostly to local climbers. Over sixty routes have been put up here over seventeen walls, with difficulties up to 5.12c/d and V7. Most are used for trad climbing and top roping, with some bouldering and sport routes present as well.

Tohickon Creek offers whitewater conditions for kayaking in the spring with the winter snow melt and several times a year when water is released from Lake Nockamixon. The creek is also a warm water fishery with smallmouth bass, sunfish, carp and catfish. The Pennsylvania Fish and Boat Commission also stocks the creek with trout.

A hiking trail of 1 mile (1.6 km) passes the millrace. There is a shaded picnic area along Tohickon Creek and a scenic vista at the top of High Rocks.

== Climate ==
According to the Trewartha climate classification system, Ralph Stover State Park has a Temperate Continental climate (Dc) with hot summers (a), cold winters (o) and year-around precipitation. Dcao climates are characterized by at least one month having an average mean temperature ≤ 32.0 °F (0 °C), four to seven months with an average mean temperature ≥ 50.0 °F (10 °C), at least one month with an average mean temperature ≥ 72.0 °F (22 °C) and no significant precipitation difference between seasons. Although most summer days are slightly humid at Ralph Stover State Park, episodes of heat and high humidity can occur with heat index values > 105 °F (41 °C). Since 1981, the highest air temperature was 102.0 °F (39 °C) on 07/22/2011, and the highest daily average mean dew point was 74.3 °F (24 °C) on 08/13/2016. The average wettest month is July which corresponds with the annual peak in thunderstorm activity. Since 1981, the wettest calendar day was 6.91 inches (176 mm) on 08/27/2011. During the winter months, the plant hardiness zone is 6b with an average annual extreme minimum air temperature of −1.7 °F (−19 °C). Since 1981, the coldest air temperature was −14.2 °F (−26 °C) on 01/22/1984. Episodes of extreme cold and wind can occur with wind chill values < −13 °F (−25 °C). The average annual snowfall (Nov-Apr) is between 30 and 36 inches (76 and 91 cm), and the average snowiest month is February which corresponds with the peak in nor'easter activity.

Climate data for Ralph Stover State Park (Ranger Station), 1981-2010 normals, extremes 1981-2018
Month	Jan	Feb	Mar	Apr	May	Jun	Jul	Aug	Sep	Oct	Nov	Dec	Year
Record high °F (°C)	70.2 (21.2)	77.9 (25.5)	86.7 (30.4)	93.5 (34.2)	94.5 (34.7)	95.0 (35.0)	102.0 (38.9)	98.9 (37.2)	97.0 (36.1)	89.0 (31.7)	80.1 (26.7)	74.4 (23.6)	102.0 (38.9)
Mean daily maximum °F (°C)	38.4 (3.6)	41.8 (5.4)	50.2 (10.1)	62.5 (16.9)	72.5 (22.5)	81.0 (27.2)	85.2 (29.6)	83.4 (28.6)	76.6 (24.8)	65.2 (18.4)	54.1 (12.3)	42.7 (5.9)	62.9 (17.2)
Daily mean °F (°C)	29.6 (−1.3)	32.4 (0.2)	40.0 (4.4)	51.0 (10.6)	60.7 (15.9)	69.8 (21.0)	74.3 (23.5)	72.7 (22.6)	65.4 (18.6)	53.8 (12.1)	44.1 (6.7)	34.2 (1.2)	52.4 (11.3)
Mean daily minimum °F (°C)	20.8 (−6.2)	23.0 (−5.0)	29.8 (−1.2)	39.4 (4.1)	48.9 (9.4)	58.5 (14.7)	63.4 (17.4)	61.9 (16.6)	54.1 (12.3)	42.3 (5.7)	34.1 (1.2)	25.7 (−3.5)	41.9 (5.5)
Record low °F (°C)	−14.2 (−25.7)	−5.7 (−20.9)	0.5 (−17.5)	16.3 (−8.7)	31.7 (−0.2)	39.5 (4.2)	46.0 (7.8)	40.4 (4.7)	33.5 (0.8)	22.6 (−5.2)	10.0 (−12.2)	−3.0 (−19.4)	−14.2 (−25.7)
Average precipitation inches (mm)	3.45 (88)	2.79 (71)	3.86 (98)	4.10 (104)	4.29 (109)	4.35 (110)	5.01 (127)	4.04 (103)	4.46 (113)	4.29 (109)	3.73 (95)	4.05 (103)	48.42 (1,230)
Average relative humidity (%)	67.3	63.8	59.4	58.1	62.7	68.3	68.3	70.9	72.2	70.1	69.3	69.3	66.7
Average dew point °F (°C)	20.1 (−6.6)	21.5 (−5.8)	27.0 (−2.8)	36.8 (2.7)	47.9 (8.8)	58.9 (14.9)	63.2 (17.3)	62.7 (17.1)	56.2 (13.4)	44.3 (6.8)	34.7 (1.5)	25.2 (−3.8)	41.6 (5.3)
Source: PRISM

== Ecology ==
According to the A. W. Kuchler U.S. potential natural vegetation types, Ralph Stover State Park would have a dominant vegetation type of Appalachian Oak (104) with a dominant vegetation form of Eastern hardwood forest (25).
