= Vector (band) =

American rock band

- Origin: Sacramento, California, U.S.
- Genres: Christian rock, new wave
- Years active: 1983–1995, 2020–present
- Labels: Exit; GaGa; Liquid Disc; Mezzo
- Members: Steve Griffith; Jimmy Abegg; Bruce Spencer
- Past members: Aaron Smith

Vector was an American rock band formed in Sacramento, California, in the early 1980s by Jimmy Abegg and Steve Griffith. The band had several drummers over the years, including Aaron Smith and Bruce Spencer, both of whom also played drums for the 77s.

Although the lyrics of Vector's music did not always contain the overt lyrics of contemporary Christian music with which the band was sometimes associated, Vector's albums were released under Christian labels, and were an example of Christian rock.

After a lengthy hiatus, Vector released a new album, Vital, in August 2021.

== Discography ==
=== Albums ===
- Mannequin Virtue (1983)
- Please Stand By (1985)
- Simple Experience (1989)
- Temptation (1995)
- Vital (2021)

=== Compilations ===
- Mannequin Virtue / Please Stand By (album) (1990) This Gaga Records CD contains Vector's first two albums: Mannequin Virtue and Please Stand By.
- Time Flies (album) (1995) This Liquid Disc Records two-disc box set contains all of Vector's first three albums: Mannequin Virtue, Please Stand By and Simple Experience, with five previously unavailable bonus tracks
