= Ping Pong over the Abyss =

Ping Pong Over The Abyss

Studio album by The 77s
- Released: 1982
- Studio: Exit Studios, Sacramento, California
- Genre: Rock, new wave
- Label: Exit
- Producer: Steven Soles

The 77s chronology
Rock and Religion Radio Show (1980)	Ping Pong Over The Abyss (1982)	All Fall Down (1984)

Professional ratings
Review scores
Source	Rating
AllMusic	2/5 stars
Cross Rhythms	9/10 stars
Trouser Press	Highly negative

Ping Pong over the Abyss is the debut album by the 77s, released in 1982 on the Exit Records label.

One song from that album, "Renaissance Man", was later recorded by the Ocean Blue. "It's So Sad" was later rerecorded, with a drastically different arrangement, by Roe's other band, the Lost Dogs, for their album MUTT.

The title comes from Allen Ginsberg's poem "Howl", section 3: "I'm with you in Rockland / where you scream in a straight jacket that you're losing the game of the actual ping pong of the abyss."

== Track listing ==
=== Side one ===
1. "A Different Kind of Light"'
2. "How Can You Love"
3. "It's So Sad"
4. "Falling Down a Hole"

=== Side two ===
1. "Someone New"
2. "Renaissance Man"
3. "Ping Pong Over the Abyss"
4. "Time Is Slipping Away"
5. "Denomination Blues (That's All)"

=== Bonus tracks (CD) ===
Bonus tracks originally found on CDs in the 123 boxset.

1. "A Different Kind of Light" (Live)
2. "How Can You Love" (4-track demo)
3. "It's So Sad" (Live)
4. "Falling Down a Hole" (Live)
5. "Ping Pong Over the Abyss" (4-track demo)
6. "Denomination Blues" (Live)

== Band members ==
- Mike Roe - guitar, lead vocals
- Mark Tootle - keyboards, guitar, vocals
- Jan Eric - bass, background vocals
- Mark Proctor - drums, vocals
