= Alternative Records =

American independent record label

- Founded: 1989
- Founder: Randy Layton
- Status: Active
- Genre: Christian, rock
- Country of origin: U.S.
- Location: Eugene, Oregon

Alternative Records is an independent record label based in Eugene, Oregon. The label started in 1989.

Formed from its previous incarnation as a mail order record company starting in 1979, Randy Layton started the label as an outlet for former Exit Records artists Steve Scott and The 77s to release back catalogue and unreleased works. The label took on other artists over time, and after distribution deals with BMG and Word Canada ended, the company would begin to focus more on fan club releases and reissues.

Since 1998, Alternative Records has been known for its many collector's versions of its albums. More Miserable Than You'll Ever Be by The 77s was issued as a box set with a 7" single, a 3-track CD single, and a 4-track cassette as a numbered, signed edition of 1,000 before being reconfigured for CD with a different track listing.

A successful fundraising campaign allowed Layton to reissue the 1977 Pantano-Salsbury Hit The Switch album on CD in the early 2020s. Despite poor health issues, Randy would also continue record sales through online sales forums. His speaking engagements would include TrueTunes podcasts and others.

Along with continued fundraising campaigns for reissue projects, Randy Layton announced in 2024 via social media that his son Matthias would be taking over direction of the label in the future. Plans would include a future release of the previously unavailable Steve Scott LP Emotional Tourist (not the artist's retrospective by the same name.) Randy Layton died of multiple myeloma on June 28, 2024.

== Artists ==
- 7&7iS (side-project for members of The 77s)
- The 77s
- Au Go-Gos
- The Commodores (1950s)
- Roy Cordell
- Daniel Amos
- Pantano-Salsbury
- Sonny Richter
- Steve Scott
- The Scratch Band
- Two Pound Planet
- Robert Vaughn & The Shadows
- The Western Gentlemen
- Sam White

== Discography ==
- Steve Scott - Lost Horizon (ES 4001) (1989)
- 7&7iS; The 77s - More Miserable Than You'll Ever Be (ES 4002) (1989 box set, 1990, 1992, 2014 reissues)
- Various Artists - The Summer Sampler (ES PR-4006) (1990)
- Steve Scott - Magnificent Obsession (ES 4007) (1991)
- Robert Vaughn & The Shadows - Songs From The Riverhouse (ES 4009) (1991)
- Two Pound Planet - Songs From The Hydrogen Jukebox (ES 4010) (1992)
- Robert Vaughn & the Shadows - White Trash Supper Club (ES 4011) (1992, 2024 reissue as bonus CD with Riverhouse album package)
- Various Artists - No Sense of History/Shirley, Goodness, & Misery (ES 4013 A/B) (1992, released with Stunt Records)
- Various Artists - Bootlevel (ES 4014) (LP version, 1992)
- Two Pound Planet - Whispering Delicious (ES 4015) (1993)
- Various Artists - Bootlevel (ES 4017) (1994, cd version; aka "Bootlevel 2")
- Robert Vaughn - Decayed (ES 4018) (1994)
- Skeleton Closet - Skeleton Closet (ES 4019;SW 9501) (1996)
- Lightweight - Lightweight (ES 4020) (1996)
- Eagle Park Slim - Northwest Blues (ES 4029) (1998)
- Robert Vaughn & The Shadows - Love And War (ES-4023) (2000 reissue, Special Edition)
- Au Go-Go's - All Over Town - Rare & Unreleased (AR PRO AU-66) (2005 compilation reissue)
- Roy Cordell - The Melody Lingers On: The Roy Cordell Archive Project (RC 001) (2014 archival compilation)
- Robert Vaughn - Decayed: 1979-1992 (AR RV4001-4003) (2014 archival compilation)
- Sonny Richter - Sonny Sings! Standards & Practices (AltNote 84152) (2018 reissue)
- The Commodores (1950s) - Unfinished Dream: The Complete Commodores, Cutups, & Harper Valley P.T.A. Sessions (AR ES-01) (2018 compilation)
- Sam White - Sweet Dreams: The Sam White Anthology (SW 4001 PRO) (2018 compilation)
- Sonny Richter - Sonny Richter's Guitar Lounge Volume Two: 1958-1992 (SS-1929) (2020 live compilation)
- The Western Gentlemen - Live At The Cowboy Bar, 1958 (AR WG 4002-RM) (2020 live release)
- Robert Vaughn & The Shadows - Love And War (ES-4030) (2022 reissue, 35th Anniversary Edition)
- Josh Rude - A Rock So Big I Cain't (PR 101, not AR) (2023, Randy Layton guest appearances)
- Pantano-Salsbury - Hit The Switch (ARSRA-2008) (2023, CD reissue of 1977 Solid Rock release)
- Josh Rude - Australia EP (2023 EP) (PR-103, not AR) (2023, Randy Layton guest appearance)
- Josh Rude - Workin' For A Livin' (PRS-04, not AR) (2024 digital single) (2024, Randy Layton guest appearance)
- Josh Rude - Gotta Go To Church! (Josh Rude Vs. The Churchgoers) (PRS-06, not AR) (2024 digital single, remix) (2024, collaborative work and Layton family benefit single)
- Robert Vaughn & The Shadows - Songs From The Riverhouse (ESLP 4010) (2024 vinyl/digital reissue of 1991 AR release)
- Josh Rude - Painted Eyelids (PRS-08, not AR) (2024 digital single) (2024, Randy Layton guest appearance)

== See also ==
- List of record labels
