= Paul and Silas in Jail =

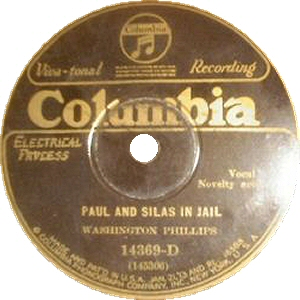

Single by Washington Phillips
- Recorded: Dallas, Texas, December 2, 1927
- Genre: Gospel blues
- Length: 2:43
- Label: Columbia
- Songwriter(s): Washington Phillips
- Producer(s): Frank B. Walker

"Paul and Silas in Jail" is a gospel blues song written by Washington Phillips (1880–1954), and recorded by him (vocals and zither) in 1927.

== Description ==
The song is in strophic form, and consists of five quatrains in rhyming couplets. According to the Acts of the Apostles, St. Paul and Silas were in Philippi (a former city in present-day Greece), where they were arrested, flogged, and imprisoned for causing a public nuisance. The song relates what happened next, as recorded in Acts 16:25-31:

25. And at midnight Paul and Silas prayed, and sang praises unto God: and the prisoners heard them.
26. And suddenly there was a great earthquake, so that the foundations of the prison were shaken: and immediately all the doors were opened, and every one's bands were loosed.
27. And the keeper of the prison awaking out of his sleep, and seeing the prison doors open, he drew out his sword, and would have killed himself, supposing that the prisoners had been fled.
28. But Paul cried with a loud voice, saying, Do thyself no harm: for we are all here.
29. Then he called for a light, and sprang in, and came trembling, and fell down before Paul and Silas,
30. And brought them out, and said, Sirs, what must I do to be saved?
31. And they said, Believe on the Lord Jesus Christ, and thou shalt be saved, and thy house.

== Recordings ==
- 1927 – Washington Phillips, Columbia Records single

== Other songs ==
- "Paul and Silas (Bound in Jail)", an unrelated gospel song about the same Biblical story; it has sometimes been called "Paul and Silas in Jail"
