= All Fall Down (The 77s album) =

Studio album by The 77s
- Released: 1984
- Studio: Exit Studios, Sacramento, California
- Genre: Rock
- Label: Exit
- Producer: Charlie Peacock

The 77s chronology
Ping Pong over the Abyss (1983)	All Fall Down (1984)	The 77s (1987)

Professional ratings
Review scores
Source	Rating
AllMusic	2.5/5 stars

All Fall Down is the 77s' second album, released in 1984 on the Exit Records label.

== Track listing ==
Side one

1. "Ba-Ba-Ba-Ba"
2. "Under the Heat"
3. "Mercy Mercy"
4. "You Don't Scare Me"
5. "Make a Difference Tonight"

Side two

1. "Caught In an Unguarded Moment"
2. "Someone New"
3. "Somethings Holding On"
4. "Your Pretty Baby"
5. "Another Nail"

Bonus tracks (CD)†

1. "Locked Inside This Moment" (Ballad Version)
2. "Locked Inside This Moment" (Rock Version)
3. "Someone New" (12-inch Version)
4. "Jesus"
5. "Tattoo"

†Bonus tracks on CDs in the 123 boxset

== The band ==
- Mike Roe — guitars and lead vocals
- Mark Tootle — keyboards, guitars and vocals
- Jan Eric — bass guitars and background vocals
- Aaron Smith — drums
