= The Church Needs Good Deacons =

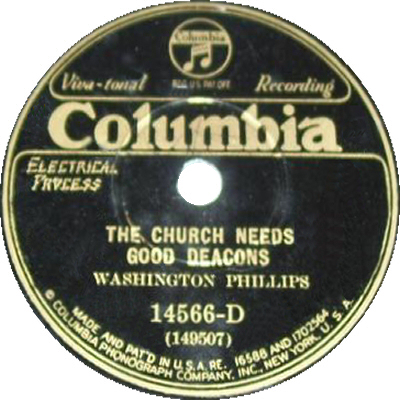

Single by Washington Phillips
- Recorded: Dallas, Texas, December 2, 1929
- Genre: Gospel blues
- Length: 3:02
- Label: Columbia
- Songwriter: Washington Phillips
- Producer: Frank B. Walker

"The Church Needs Good Deacons" is a gospel blues song written by Washington Phillips (1880–1954) and recorded by him in 1929 (vocals and zither).

A deacon is a Christian minister associated with service of some kind, which varies among theological and denominational traditions. Phillips refers to the great example of St. Stephen, one of the seven deacons appointed to distribute food and charitable aid to poorer members of the community in the early church. He goes on to say:

A deacon he must be a clean man,
And he must live a mighty smooth life,
He must have his children under good control,
And be the husband of one wife.

He condemns deacons of his time who "won't put up with one honest woman, but tries to live with two or three", and concludes with a reference to the description of what the character of a deacon should be in the First Epistle to Timothy (traditionally attributed to St. Paul) at 3:8–13.

== Recordings ==
- 1929 – Washington Phillips, 10-inch 78 rpm single Columbia 14566-D
