= Ralph Stanley (album) =

Studio album by Ralph Stanley
- Released: June 11, 2002
- Genre: Country
- Length: 40:57
- Label: DMZ / Columbia
- Producer: Bob Neuwirth, T Bone Burnett, Larry Ehrlich

Ralph Stanley chronology
Live at the Smithsonian (2002)	Ralph Stanley (2002)	Live at the Smithsonian, Vol. 2 (2002)

Professional ratings
Review scores
Source	Rating
AllMusic	3/5 stars
The Guardian	4/5 stars

Ralph Stanley is an album by American country singer Ralph Stanley, released in 2002. It was produced by Bob Neuwirth, Larry Ehrlich and T Bone Burnett.

== Track listing ==
1. "Lift Him Up, That's All" – 4:41
2. "False Hearted Lover's Blues" – 4:52
3. "Henry Lee" – 4:43
4. "Girl from the Greenbriar Shore" – 3:59
5. "Twelve Gates to the City" – 1:57
6. "Little Mathie Grove" – 4:30
7. "Look on and Cry" – 3:38
8. "I'll Remember You Love in My Prayers" – 1:31
9. "Calling You" – 3:25
10. "The Death of John Henry" – 3:59
11. "Great High Mountain" – 3:42

== Personnel ==
- Ralph Stanley – vocals
- Stuart Duncan – banjo, violin
- Dennis Crouch – bass
- Norman Blake – guitar, lap steel guitar, mandocello
- Mike Compton – mandolin
- Evelyn Cox – harmony vocals
- Suzanne Cox – harmony vocals

== Chart performance ==
Chart (2002)	Peak position
US Billboard 200	163
US Top Bluegrass Albums (Billboard)	3
US Top Country Albums (Billboard)	22
US Heatseekers Albums (Billboard)	5
