= Mark Herzig =

American cinematographer

Mark Herzig is an American cinematographer and professor of the cinematic arts and the Director of the Short Film Program of the Sacramento French Film Festival. He has also taught at the Academy of Art University in San Francisco, California, California State University in Sacramento, California, and the Prague Film School in Prague, Czech Republic. He was born in Pasadena, California.
