= Real Men Cry =

Studio album by Lost Dogs
- Released: 2001
- Studio: Neverland Studios, Nashville, Tennessee
- Genre: Roots music
- Label: BEC
- Producer: Terry Scott Taylor, Derri Daugherty, Mike Roe

Lost Dogs chronology
Gift Horse (1999)	Real Men Cry (2001)	Nazarene Crying Towel (2003)

Professional ratings
Review scores
Source	Rating
AllMusic	4/5 stars

Real Men Cry is an album by roots music band Lost Dogs, released on BEC Records in 2001.

This was the first album by the Lost Dogs after Gene Eugene's death in March 2000 and is a tribute to him.

The song "Lovely Man" is not listed on the back cover of the CD. It was intended to go between the songs "Three Legged Dog" and "When The Judgement Comes," but was moved and drastically edited by the label, BEC Records. The label objected to the lyric "right by damn," and completely edited it from the recording on the final album. The song, in its unedited form, has been released on CD on a Paste magazine CD sampler.

== Track listing ==
1. "A Certain Love" (Taylor) (2:58)
2. "Gates of Eden" (Taylor) (5:08)
3. "Real Men Cry" (Taylor) (3:36)
4. "Three Legged Dog" (Taylor) (2:10)
5. "When the Judgment Comes" (Taylor) (2:40)
6. "In the Distance" (Taylor) (4:24)
7. "The Great Divide" (Taylor) (2:31)
8. "The Mark of Cain" (Taylor) (3:35)
9. "Dust on the Bible" (Bailes) (2:59)
10. "Wild Ride" (Taylor) (3:35)
11. "Golden Dreams" (Taylor) (4:51)
12. "No Shadow of Turning" (Taylor) (2:33)
13. "Lovely Man" (Roe) (3:45)

== The band ==
- Derri Daugherty — guitars and vocals
- Mike Roe — guitars and vocals
- Terry Scott Taylor — guitars and vocals

== Additional musicians ==
- Tim Chandler — bass
- Frank Lenz — drums, percussion
- Mike Knott — vocal on "A Certain Love"
- Doctor Love — bass
- Phil Madeira — pull-string Telecaster, B3 organ, accordion
