= The Green Room Serenade, Part One =

Studio album by Lost Dogs
- Released: 1996
- Recorded: The Green Room (Huntington Beach, California)
- Genre: Roots music
- Label: BAI
- Producer: Terry Scott Taylor; Gene Eugene; Derri Daugherty; Mike Roe

Lost Dogs chronology
Little Red Riding Hood (1993)	The Green Room Serenade, Part One (1996)	Gift Horse (1999)

Professional ratings
Review scores
Source	Rating
AllMusic	3/5 stars

Green Room Serenade, Part One is an album by American roots music band Lost Dogs. Named after Gene Eugene's Huntington Beach recording studio, The Green Room, it was released on BAI Records in 1996.

== Track listing ==
1. "The Green Room Serenade" (Taylor) (1:42)
2. "Up in the Morning" (Taylor) (5:19)
3. "Cry Baby" (Eugene) (3:01)
4. "Love Takes Over The World" (Taylor) (4:37)
5. "Close But No Cigar" (Taylor) (2:57)
6. "All That Remains" (Taylor) (5:21)
7. "Sweet Work of Love" (Taylor) (5:26)
8. "If it Be Your Will" (Leonard Cohen) (3:59)
9. "Mexico" (Eugene) (4:10)
10. "The Prodigal Bride (I'll Wait For You)" (Taylor) (4:48)
11. "Hey, You Little Devil" (Taylor/Daugherty/Eugene) (3:40)
12. "I Don't Love You" (Roe) (2:51)
13. "Reasonable Service" (Taylor) (5:01)
14. "Waiting For You to Come Around" (Daugherty/Eugene) (5:55)
15. "Breathe Deep (The Breath of God) - 1996" (Taylor) (4:15)

== The band ==
- Derri Daugherty — vocals, electric and acoustic guitars, bass
- Gene Eugene — vocals, Fender Rhodes electric piano, B-3 organ, guitars, bass
- Mike Roe — vocals, lead guitar, acoustic guitar, bass
- Terry Scott Taylor — vocals, acoustic guitars

== Additional musicians ==
- Tim Chandler — bass
- Burleigh Drummond — drums
- Greg Kellogg — pedal steel, banjo, dobro
- James Sitterly — violin

== Production notes ==
- Recorded and Mixed by Gene Eugene and Lost Dogs at The Green Room, Huntington Beach.
- B-3 Recorded at Desert Moon, Anaheim.
- Additional Engineering by Eric Tokle.
- Art Direction, Design, Concepts, Photography and Clay Sculptures by the "Fabulous" Anna Cardenas.
