= Train Your Child =

Single by Washington Phillips
- Recorded: Dallas, Texas, December 4, 1928
- Genre: Gospel blues
- Length: 3:09
- Label: Columbia
- Songwriter: Washington Phillips
- Producer: Frank B. Walker

"Train Your Child" was recorded in 1928 by Washington Phillips (1880–1954). It is remarkable in that it divides into two distinct parts: (1) a spoken homily by him about child-rearing, and (2) an instrumental solo in gospel blues style on his unique zither-like instrument.

The homily comments on the Book of Proverbs (attributed to King Solomon) at 22:6:

Train up a child in the way he should go
And when he is old, he will not depart from it

== Recordings ==
- 1928 – Washington Phillips, 78 rpm single Columbia 14448-D
