= Love Coma =

- Origin: San Antonio, U.S.
- Genres: Christian rock
- Label: R.E.X.

Love Coma is a Christian rock/alternative group in the early 1990s based in the San Antonio area of Texas. The group disbanded in 1997 following the bankruptcy of its record label.

Critics have compared the band's sound to that of Simple Minds and The Mission UK, and band members cite other influences such as The Waterboys and The 77s. The Dallas Morning News, reviewing the album Language of Fools, wrote that the music is "[s]mart and subtle, seductive even."

Lead singer Chris Taylor later undertook a solo career. He won the grand prize in a Dove soap jingle contest in 1997 with a song he called Lather Up which was written to the Rolling Stones tune Start Me Up. Taylor's 2000 album, Worthless Pursuit of Things on the Earth, was nominated as Rock Album of the Year for the 2001 Dove Awards. Chris Taylor and Dave Stewart have co-written a song called "Here and Gone (But Everlasting)".

In 2019, the band reformed to begin work on their first album in over two decades. The result, Love Coma, was released on October 26, 2020.

== Members ==
- Chris Dodds – drums went on play for Two Tons of Steel
- Matt Slocum – guitar left to pursue opportunities with Sixpence None the Richer
- Chris Taylor – lead vocals
- Chris Mattingly – lead guitar
- Jeff Duncan – bass guitar
- TJ Behling – bass guitar
- Matt Odom – bass guitar
- Curtis Saunier – bass guitar

== Discography ==
- Soul Rash (1993)
- Language of Fools (R.E.X. Records, 1996)
