= Gift Horse (album) =

Studio album by Lost Dogs
- Released: 2000
- Recorded: The Green Room (Huntington Beach, California)
- Genre: Roots music
- Label: BEC
- Producer: Terry Scott Taylor; Gene Eugene; Derri Daugherty; Mike Roe

Lost Dogs chronology
| The Green Room Serenade, Part One (1996) | Gift Horse (2000) | Real Men Cry (2001) |

Professional ratings
Review scores
| Source | Rating |
|---|---|
| AllMusic | 4.5/5 stars |

Gift Horse is a studio album by the folk rock band Lost Dogs. It was released in 1999 on BEC Records.

This turned out to be Gene Eugene's last album with the band, as he died in The Green Room shortly after its release. BEC Records retitled one song as "A Vegas Story" for the album's artwork. To this day, fans of the band continue to call it by its real name, "Free Drinks and a Dream". The song also goes by that name during concert performances and on later live albums and videos.

== Track listing ==
1. "Ghost Train (To Nowhere)" (Taylor) (4:38)
2. "Free Drinks and a Dream (A Vegas Story)" (Taylor) (4:53)
3. "If You Loved Here (You'd Be Home By Now)" (Taylor) (3:09)
4. "Diamonds to Coal" (Taylor) (3:44)
5. "A Blessing In Disguise" (Taylor) (4:37)
6. "Loved and Forgiven" (Taylor) (4:47)
7. "Rebecca Go Home" (Taylor) (4:03)
8. "Honeysuckle Breeze" (Taylor) (2:56)
9. "Ditto" (Taylor) (4:18)
10. "The Wall of Heaven" (Taylor) (4:35)
11. "Farther Along" (Traditional, Arranged by The Lost Dogs) (4:11)

== Personnel ==
- Derri Daugherty — guitars and vocals
- Burleigh Drummond — drums and percussion
- Gene Eugene — guitars, piano, and vocals
- Mike Roe — guitars and vocals
- Terry Scott Taylor — guitars and vocals

Additional musicians

- Melissa Hasin — cello
- John McDuffie — pedal steel

Production notes

- Recorded and mixed by Gene Eugene and Lost Dogs at The Green Room, Huntington Beach, California.
