= True Tunes News =

American Christian music magazine

- Editor: John J. Thompson
- Categories: Christian alternative rock
- Frequency: Irregular
- Circulation: 50,000
- Founded: 1989
- Final issue: Winter 1998
- Country: United States

True Tunes News is a magazine which covered alternative Christian music. It was published between 1989 and Winter 1998.

== Background ==
John J. Thompson founded in 1998 True Tunes News out of his Wheaton, Illinois Christian record shop, True Tunes. The store itself, founded in 1989, with Chris Langill, was relatively unique because it focused exclusively on alternative Christian music at a time when Christian bookstores wouldn't carry products based on rock, hip hop, or other hard forms of music. In 1995 Thompson founded a live music club for Christian acts called True Tunes Upstairs. In 1997 the store, magazine, and related assets were bought by the Charlottesville, VA based company Journey Communications. Journey closed the shop in early 1998 citing lagging sales due to the spread of alternative Christian music to larger retailers, and turned operations to the printed magazine and the internet.

Despite competition from CCM, HM, and 7ball magazines True Tunes News was extremely successful, achieving a worldwide circulation of 50,000 issues by 1993. This made it the largest Christian rock magazine by circulation, a title it held through the late 1990s. In the late 1990s the magazine ran into financial trouble when several of the record labels whose advertising financed it and it went defunct in 1998. When it ceased publishing the editors turned to the internet for distribution, but this effort has now been disbanded.
