= Lift Him Up That's All =

Single by Washington Phillips
- Recorded: Dallas, Texas, December 2, 1927
- Genre: Gospel blues
- Length: 3:31
- Label: Columbia
- Songwriter: Unknown
- Producer: Frank B. Walker

"Lift Him Up That's All" is a gospel blues song recorded in 1927 by Washington Phillips. It is a solo performance, with Phillips' vocals and zither.

== Description ==
The verses tell the story of Jesus and the Samaritan woman at the well, found in the Gospel of John at 4:4-30.

The refrain draws from the Gospel of John at 12:32, often interpreted as a prophecy of the Crucifixion and/or the Resurrection of Jesus:

And I, if I be lifted up from the earth, will draw all men unto me.

and runs as follows:

Oh, lift Him up, that's all,
Lift Him up in His word,
If you'll tell the name of Jesus everywhere,
If you'll keep His name a-ringin' everywhere that you go,
He will draw men unto Him.

The song seems to have fallen into obscurity until revived in 2002 by the bluegrass musician Ralph Stanley.

The song was played during the last scene of Episode 2 of the HBO series Perry Mason 2020.

== Recordings ==
- 1927 – Washington Phillips, Columbia Records single
- c. 1928 – Blind Benny Paris and Wife, Victor Records(?) single
- 2002 – Ralph Stanley, "Lift Him Up, That's All" on the album Ralph Stanley
- 2011 – Ralph Stanley, "Lift Him Up, That's All" on the album A Mother's Prayer

== Other songs ==
The refrain has some resemblances to that of the 1903 hymn "Lift Him Up" by Johnson Oatman, Jr., but the music and verses are different.

== See also ==
- "Jesus Met the Woman at the Well", a different gospel song on the same Biblical story
