= Lost Dogs =

American band

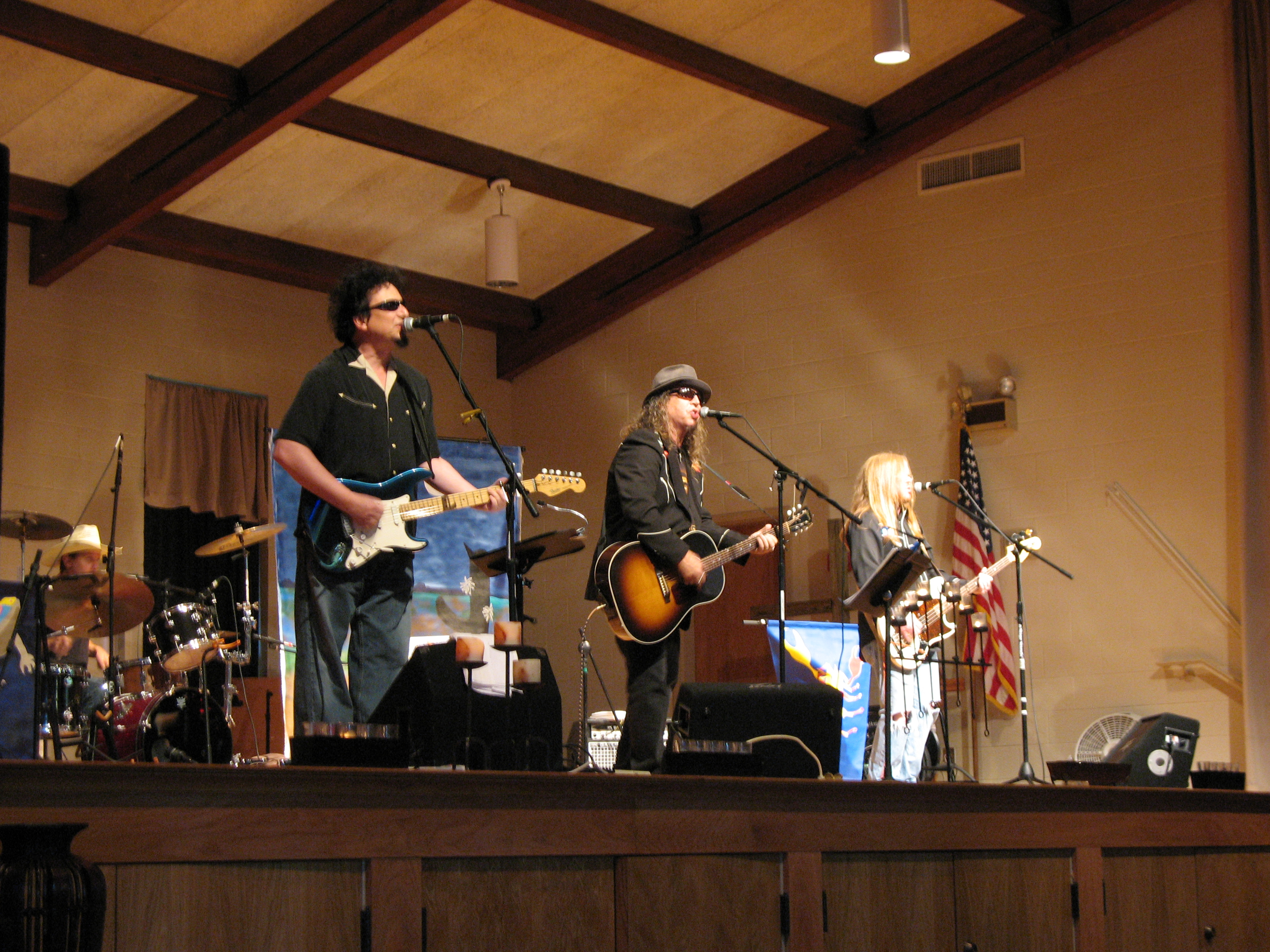
- Lost Dogs performing in 2007

Background information
- Origin: California, US
- Genres: Roots music, Americana, folk, rock, blues
- Years active: 1991–present
- Members: Terry Scott Taylor; Michael Roe; Derri Daugherty; Steve Hindalong
- Past members: Gene Eugene

Lost Dogs are an American musical supergroup formed in 1991, comprising vocalists, songwriters, and guitarists from multiple Christian alternative rock bands. Their current lineup includes Terry Scott Taylor (Daniel Amos, The Swirling Eddies), Michael Roe (The 77s), Derri Daugherty and Steve Hindalong (The Choir). The original lineup included Gene Eugene (Adam Again), who died in 2000. The band's eclectic blending of folk, blues, country, and rock has been characterized as "a sort of CCM equivalent to the Traveling Wilburys". The band released their debut album Scenic Routes in 1992 as a one-time collaboration.

Lost Dogs concert performances are filled with between-song jokes and one-liners between the band members (usually poking fun at each other). Many Lost Dogs albums include at least one or two cover songs. Songs covered by Lost Dogs on an album or in concert include Bob Dylan's "Lord Protect My Child", Leonard Cohen's "If It Be Your Will", The Beatles' "I'm A Loser", "The Chipmunk Song (Christmas Don't Be Late)", and Stephen Foster's "Hard Times, Come Again No More".

In March 2000, shortly after the release of their Gift Horse album, Gene Eugene died.

In 2004, the band got together with Steve Hindalong to produce a special album for their summer tour. The result was entitled Mutt, and included new acoustic versions of ten songs originally written and recorded for each band member's regular rock bands. The following year, the band would release the almost entirely instrumental Island Dreams. The Lost Cabin and the Mystery Trees was released July 2006.

In 2008, the Lost Dogs traveled down historic Route 66 with cinematographer Jimmy Abegg. Abegg filmed the band's experiences. The band then wrote and recorded 14 songs inspired by their journey, which was released as Old Angel in May 2010.

== Discography ==
- Scenic Routes (1992)
- Little Red Riding Hood (1993)
- The Green Room Serenade, Part One (1996)
- Gift Horse (1999)
- Real Men Cry (2001)
- Nazarene Crying Towel (2003)
- Mutt (2004)
- The Lost Cabin and the Mystery Trees (2006)
- Old Angel (2010)
- Trick of the Light (2025)

=== Live albums ===
- The Green Room Serenade, Part Tour (2002)
- It Came from the Basement! (2011)

=== Instrumental albums ===
- Island Dreams (2005)

=== Holiday albums ===
- We Like to Have Christmas (2007)

=== Compilations and special releases ===
- Surfonic Water Revival, Various Artists, (1998)
- The Best of the Lost Dogs, The Lost Dogs, (1999)
- Happy Christmas Vol. 2, Various Artists, (1999)
- Making God Smile: An Artists' Tribute to the Songs of Beach Boy Brian Wilson, Various Artists, (2002)
- August & Everything Remastered (2012)
- There's a Rainbow Somewhere: The Songs of Randy Stonehill, Various Artists, (2022)

== Videography ==
- The Lost Dogs...Via Chicago, 2003 DVD (plus bonus CD)
- Via Chicago (All We Left Unsaid), 2006 DVD (plus bonus CD)
- It Came from the Basement!, DVD/CD (2011)

=== Further reading ===
- "Lost Dogs". 7ball (6). May–June 1996.
