= Denomination Blues =

Song composed by Washington Phillips

Single by Washington Phillips
- Recorded: Dallas, Texas, December 5, 1927
- Genre: Gospel blues
- Length: 3:07 (Part 1); 2:40 (Part 2)
- Label: Columbia
- Songwriter: Washington Phillips
- Producer: Frank B. Walker

"Denomination Blues" is a gospel blues song composed by Washington Phillips (1880–1954), and recorded by him (vocals and zither) in 1927.

In 1938, Sister Rosetta Tharpe (1915–1973) recorded a gospel version of the song under the title "That's All". She subsequently recorded several versions with orchestral accompaniment.

In 1972, Ry Cooder recorded the song on his album Into the Purple Valley.

== The songs ==
=== Denomination Blues ===
Phillips' song is in two parts, occupying both sides of a 78rpm single (it is over five minutes long, and could not have fit on a single side because of technical limitations). In 1928, it sold just over 8,000 copies; a considerable number at a time when a typical single by Bessie Smith, "The Empress of the Blues", sold around 10,000.

The tune is that of "Hesitation Blues", but the words are very different.

The song is in strophic form: it consists of 17 verses sung to essentially the same music, all with a similar last line. In Part 1, Phillips gently mocks several Christian denominations for their particular obsessions (Primitive Baptists, Missionary Baptists, A.M.E. Methodists, African Methodists, Holiness People, and Church of God); and in Part 2, several types of people he felt were insincere in their beliefs (preachers who want your money, preachers who insist that a college education is needed to preach the gospel, and people who "jump from church to church"). Phillips is known to have attended several churches of different denominations, and the lyrics likely reflect his personal experience. His own faith was uncomplicated, as these extracts from the lyrics show:

I want to tell you, an actual fact,
Every man don't understand the Bible alike,
But that's all, I tell you that's all,
But you'd better have Jesus, I tell you that's all.

Well, denominations have no right to fight,
They ought to just treat each other right. That's all.
...
You're fightin' each other, and think you're doing well,
And the sinners on the outside are going to hell. And that's all.
...
It's right to stand together, it's wrong to stand apart,
'Cause none's going to heaven but the pure in heart. And that's all.

The song appears to have been thereafter completely neglected until 1972, when Ry Cooder included a version (with verses omitted and rearranged) on his album Into the Purple Valley. It has since been covered several times. Many cover versions omit some of, or rearrange, or add to, or rewrite, Phillips' words; perhaps for artistic reasons, or perhaps to support the artist's own beliefs; sometimes contradicting the message Phillips had tried to convey. Some cover artists, negligently or otherwise, have claimed the song to be their own composition.

=== That's All ===
"That's All"

Single by Sister Rosetta Tharpe
- A-side: "My Man and I"
- Recorded: New York City, October 31, 1938
- Genre: Gospel
- Length: 2:34
- Label: Decca
- Songwriter: Washington Phillips

In 1938, Sister Rosetta Tharpe recorded a version of the song entitled "That's All" for Decca Records. She recorded four songs that day, the first gospel songs recorded by Decca; all were immediate successes. The tune is similar to but not identical to Phillips'; the lyrics include some of Phillips' words (notably the striking phrase "educated fool", and the words "that's all" repeated at the end of each verse), but differ in several ways. That, and her choice of title, suggests that she may have learned the song through oral tradition rather than from Phillips' recording. In 1941, she re-recorded the song, accompanied by Lucky Millinder's Jazz Orchestra. She continued to perform it throughout her career.

Although Tharpe's "That's All" had gained an independent life, the recording history suggests that it and Phillips' "Denomination Blues" have merged back into a single stream following Cooder's 1972 cover of the latter song; for example, The 77s' 1982 version uses both titles.

== Recordings ==
=== Denomination Blues ===
- 1927 – Washington Phillips, Columbia single
- 1969-74 – Perry Tillis
- 1972 – Ry Cooder, on the album Into the Purple Valley
- 1975 – Barry McGuire, 2nd Chapter of Acts and a band called David, on the album To the Bride
- 1975 – Parchment, on the album Shamblejam
- 1982 – The 77s, "Denomination Blues (That's All)" on the album Ping Pong over the Abyss
- 1992 – Marianne Antonsen, on the album Pickin' Up the Spirit
- 1996 – Michael Hakanson-Stacy, "Denomination Blues, Pt. 2" on the album Sanctuary Blues
- 1999 – Geoff Bartley, on the album Hear That Wind Howl
- 2000 – The 77s, on the album Late
- 2005 – Taylor Grocery Band, on the album Taylor Grocery Band
- 2006 – Rodney Crowell, on the album Voice of the Spirit, Gospel of the South
- 2008 – Buddy Greene, on the DVD A Campfire Homecoming
- 2009 – Ashley Cleveland, on the album God Don't Never Change
- 2010 – Blue Rhythm Boys, on the album Come On If You're Comin'
- 2011 – Kenny Brown, on the album Can't Stay Long

=== That's All ===
- 1938 – Sister Rosetta Tharpe, Decca single
- 1941 – Sister Rosetta Tharpe with Lucky Millinder's Jazz Orchestra, Decca single
- 1943 – Sister Rosetta Tharpe with Lucky Millinder's Jazz Orchestra (live)
- 1943 – Sister Rosetta Tharpe with (probably) Noble Sissle and His Orchestra (live)
- 1961 – Sister Rosetta Tharpe
- 2013 – Brick Fields and The Chosen Ones (feat. Rj Mischo), on the MP3 album Go Ahead and Sang the Blues
