= Michael Roe =

American musician

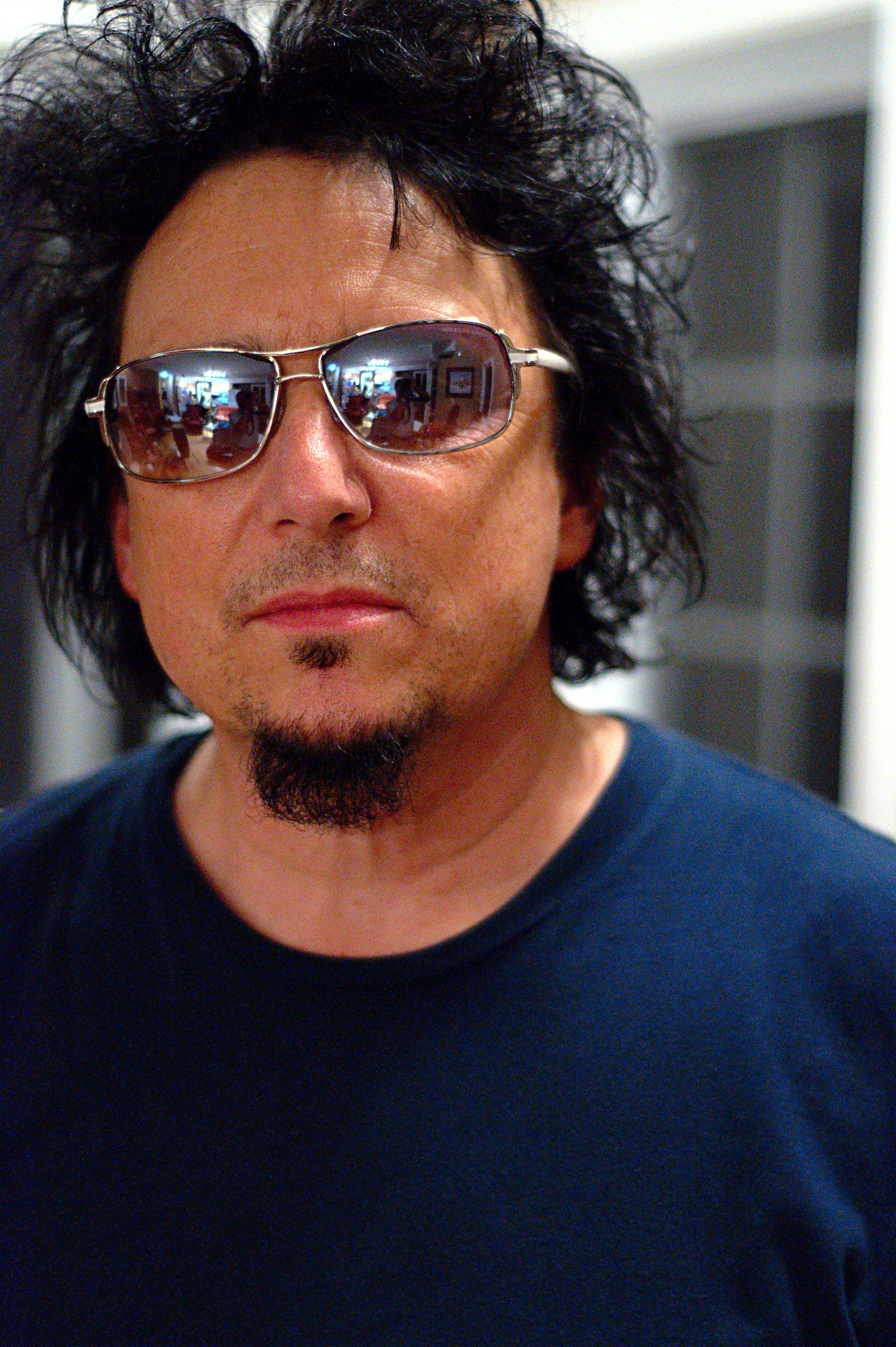
- Roe in 2009

Background information
- Born: October 12, 1954 (age 71); San Jose, California, U.S.
- Genres: Christian alternative rock; rock
- Occupations: Musician; singer; songwriter; record producer
- Instruments: Guitar; vocals
- Labels: Exit; Lo-Fidelity; Fools of the World
- Website: www.michaelroe.com

Michael Roe (born October 12, 1954) is an American, singer, songwriter, and record producer. He is a founding member of the band the 77s and the Lost Dogs and has recorded several solo albums.

== Career ==
Although he has released several solo albums since the mid-1990s, Roe is primarily known as the lead singer and lead guitarist for the Christian alternative rock band the 77s. In addition to releasing albums under the moniker 7&7iS, he has recorded several instrumental albums with bandmate Mark Harmon. Roe is also a founding member of Lost Dogs.

== Discography ==
Solo

- More Miserable Than You'll Ever Be, 7&7is (1989)
- Fun with Sound with Mark Harmon, 7&7iS (2004)
- RoesBuds (Fools of the World, 1994)
- Safe as Milk (Via, 1995)
- The Boat Ashore (Innocent Media, 1996)
- Safe as Milk Live – Cornerstone 1997 (Millenium Eight, 1999)
- Orbis with Mark Harmon (Fools of the World, 1999)
- Daydream with Mark Harmon (Fools of the World, 1999)
- Say Your Prayers (Fools of the World, 2002)
- All Day Sing and Dinner on the Ground with Terry Scott Taylor (Stunt/Fools of the World, 2003)
- We're All Gonna Face the Rising Sun (Lo-Fidelity, 2009)
- Michael Roe (Fools of the World, 2010)
- Kerosene Halo, with Derri Daugherty (2011)
- Guadalupe (Lo-Fidelity, 2014)
- Gimme a Kickstart ... and a Phrase or Two (Lo-Fidelity, 2014)
- Live in Torrance (Lo-Fidelity, 2014)
- Gothic (2016)

With the 77s

- Ping Pong over the Abyss (Exit, 1982)
- All Fall Down (Exit, 1984)
- The 77s (Island, 1987)
- 7&7iS More Miserable Than You'll Ever Be (1989, 1990, 2014)
- Sticks and Stones (Broken, 1990)
- Eighty Eight (Brainstorm Artists International, 1991)
- The 77s (a.k.a. Pray Naked) (Brainstorm, 1992)
- Drowning with Land in Sight (Myrrh, 1994)
- Tom Tom Blues (Brainstorm, 1995)
- Echos o' Faith (Fools of the World, 1996)
- EP
- A Golden Field of Radioactive Crows (Fools of the World, 2001)
- 7&7iS Fun with Sound (Fools of the World, 2004)
- Ninety Nine (Lo-Fidelity, 2007)
- Holy Ghost Building (Lo-Fidelity, 2008)
- Seeds and Stems (Lo-Fidelity, 2012)
- 7&7iS Misery Loves Company (Lo-Fidelity, 2014)
- Gimme a Kickstart ... and a Phrase or Two (Lo-Fidelity, 2014)
- Naked & Unashamed (2017)

With Lost Dogs

- Scenic Routes (1992)
- Little Red Riding Hood (1993)
- The Green Room Serenade, Part One (1996)
- Gift Horse (1999)
- Real Men Cry (2001)
- Nazarene Crying Towel (2003)
- MUTT (2004)
- Island Dreams (2005)
- The Lost Cabin and the Mystery Trees (2006)
- Old Angel (2010)
