= Ralph Stover =

American politician and judge (1760–1811)

Ralph Stover (January 10, 1760 – November 7, 1811), son of the immigrant Henry Stauffer, was an American Justice of the Peace and politician in Pennsylvania. He was a member of the Pennsylvania House of Representatives, 1793–99.

== History of Bucks County, Pennsylvania ==
We quote from W. W. H. Davis The History of Bucks County, Pennsylvania published in 1876 (2nd edition 1905). For a more complete quote see the article on his father Henry Stauffer.

The most prominent members of the Stover family were Ralph, youngest son of Henry, the immigrant, and his eldest son, Abraham F. Stover. The former, born January 10, 1760, married Catharine, daughter of Abraham Funk, owned a farm on the Tohickon where the Easton road crosses that stream, and died there November 7, 1811. He was many years a Justice of the Peace, when a much more important office than now, and member of the Assembly, 1793–99, inclusive. While a member of Assembly, he had an act passed changing the name "Stauffer" to "Stover." His son Abraham F. Stover, born May 10, 1786, married Rachel Fretz, of Warwick, and died 1854. He followed in his father's footsteps; was several years a Justice of Peace and Surveyor, and three years a member of Assembly, 1817–1820; removed to Farquier County, Virginia, 1833, purchased a 300-acre (1.2 km^{2}) farm and died there. The late Ralph Stover, Point Pleasant, was one of his children.

— W. W. H. Davis, THE HISTORY OF BUCKS COUNTY, PENNSYLVANIA, CHAPTER XXXV, BEDMINSTER,

== History of Ralph Stover State Park ==
Tohickon Creek was named by the Lenape some of the first inhabitants of the area. "To-Hick-Hanne" means "Deer-Bone-Creek". Ralph Stover State Park was the site of an 18th-century gristmill that was built on Tohickon Creek by the park's namesake, Ralph Stover. Remnants of the mill and mill race can still be seen near Tohickon Creek, Pennsylvania.

The Stover family gave their land to the Commonwealth of Pennsylvania in 1931. The recreational facilities were built during the Great Depression by the Federal Works Progress Administration created by U.S. President Franklin D. Roosevelt to provide work for the unemployed. Author James A. Michener donated the High Rocks area to the park in 1956. Although "High Rocks State Park" is listed in the United States Geological Survey Geographic Names Information System and the coordinates given in USGS GNIS are located here, it was never an official name according to the Pennsylvania Department of Conservation and Natural Resources or a separate park.

== Literature ==
- Fretz, A. J. A Genealogical Record of the Descendants of Henry Stauffer. Milton, NJ, 1899.
