= Lord Protect My Child =

Song written by Bob Dylan

Song by Bob Dylan

from the album The Bootleg Series Volumes 1–3 (Rare & Unreleased) 1961–1991
- Language: English
- Released: March 26, 1991
- Recorded: May 2, 1983
- Genre: Blues; Contemporary Christian
- Label: Columbia
- Songwriter: Bob Dylan

"Lord Protect My Child" is a song written by Bob Dylan, who recorded it at New York City's The Power Station in ten takes on May 2, 1983. The song is an outtake from Dylan's album Infidels that was later included in The Bootleg Series Volumes 1–3 (Rare & Unreleased) 1961–1991 on Volume 3. It is not known why Dylan decided not to include "Lord Protect My Child" on Infidels. It is a Christian song, the lyrics of which express concern for Dylan's child. Reviewer Jonathan Lethem called the song "an achingly candid blues-plea which [provides] a rare glimpse of Bob Dylan-the-parent". Susan Tedeschi, Derek Trucks, and Dave Brubeck performed a cover version of "Lord Protect My Child", which was produced by Chris Brubeck and used as the theme song for the human trafficking documentary film Not My Life.
