= Washington Phillips =

American musician

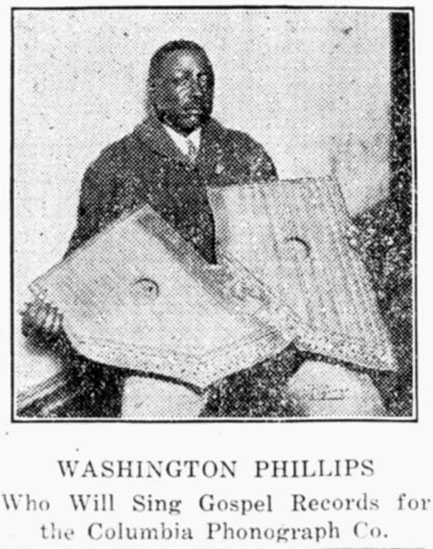

Background information
- Born: George Washington Phillips; January 11, 1880; Texas, U.S. (probably Freestone County)
- Died: September 20, 1954 (aged 74) Teague, Texas, U.S.
- Genres: Gospel; Gospel blues
- Occupations: Musician; Songwriter; Preacher
- Instruments: Voice; Zither
- Years active: 1927–29

George Washington "Wash" Phillips (January 11, 1880 – September 20, 1954) was an American gospel and gospel blues singer and instrumentalist. The exact nature of the instrument or instruments he played is uncertain, being identified only as "novelty accompaniment" on the labels of the 78 rpm records released during his lifetime.

== Biography ==
He was born in Texas, on January 11, 1880, the son of Tim Phillips (from Mississippi) and Nancy Phillips (née Cooper, from Texas).

People who knew him as an adult recalled him as standing about 5 ft 8 in (1.73 m) or 5 ft 9 in (1.75 m) tall, and being "stocky" or about 180 lb (82 kg); and that he was a snuff-dipper. He farmed 30–40 acres (12–16 ha) of land by the settlement of Simsboro near Teague, Texas. He was described as a "jack-leg preacher" – i.e. someone not necessarily an ordained minister, who would attend regular services at churches hoping for an opportunity to preach, but who would more often address spontaneous gatherings in the street, or set up their own storefront churches. He was a member of Pleasant Hill Trinity Baptist Church in Simsboro, but is also known to have attended the "sanctified" St. Paul Church of God In Christ, and the St. James Methodist Church, Teague. His song "Denomination Blues" criticizes sectarianism in organized religion and hypocritical preachers. His uncomplicated and sincere faith is summarized in the last two lines of that song:

It's right to stand together, it's wrong to stand apart,
'Cause none's going to heaven but the pure in heart. And that's all.

Between 1927 and 1929, he recorded 18 songs for Columbia Records in a makeshift recording studio in Dallas, Texas, under the direction of Frank B. Walker. Six of those songs were the first and second parts of three two-part songs, intended for opposite sides of one record. Four songs were unreleased at the time, and two are thought to have been lost.

On September 20, 1954, he died of head injuries, sustained in a fall down a flight of stairs at the welfare office in Teague. He was buried in an unmarked grave in Cotton Gin Cemetery, six miles west of Teague. His wife Marie outlived him.

Some sources suggest his birthdate as c. 1892 and/or his date and place of death as December, 1938 in Austin State Hospital. Research has shown that this was likely a different George Washington Phillips, the son of Houston Phillips and Emma Phillips (née Titus); he too farmed near Teague.

In September 2023, a headstone was placed for Washington Phillips by the Killer Blues Headstone Project in Cotton Gin Cemetery outside Teague, Texas.

== Phillips' instruments ==
A photograph in The Louisiana Weekly of January 14, 1928, shows Phillips holding two fretless zither-like instruments. That date lies between the second and third of his five recording sessions. The instrument in his right hand has been identified as a celestaphone and that in his left as a phonoharp, both manufactured by the Phonoharp Company; in both cases with the hammer attachment missing (the instruments as sold were a type of hammered dulcimer).

In the 1960s, Frank B. Walker identified Phillips' instrument to musicologist and author Paul Oliver as a "dulceola", saying that "nobody else on earth could use it except him". Before a recording session, Phillips would spend half an hour or more assembling it. It has often been assumed that Walker meant a dolceola, but that cannot be so: the dolceola was manufactured, sold, and recorded commercially, and did not need assembly before use. It seems more likely that the name "dulceola" was coined specifically for unusual instruments made by Phillips himself from broken discarded ones.

The aural evidence suggests Phillips strummed and plucked the strings of his instrument, and did not hammer them. Some listeners have claimed to discern differences between the instruments he used in different songs.

In 2016, the journalist Michael Corcoran discovered a 1907 newspaper article which reported that Phillips' name for his instrument was a "manzarene", and further described it as "a box about 2×3 feet, 6 inches deep, [on] which he has strung violin strings, something on the order of an autoharp... He uses both hands and plays all sorts of airs. Others were influenced by Mike Ferguson's references that Washington had created his music on a simple 6 string, but Ferguson later discredited that after further review". This newly discovered name for the instrument was factored into the title of a 2016 collection of Phillips' surviving recordings, Washington Phillips and His Manzarene Dreams.

== Grammy nominations ==
The album, Washington Phillips and His Manzarene Dreams, received two nominations for the 2018 Grammy Awards, for Best Historical Album and Best Album Notes.

== Cultural legacy ==
Numerous compilations of Washington Phillips' complete recorded work have been released, such as The Key to the Kingdom on Yazoo Records in 2005. His songs have been covered by a variety of artists:

- Sister Rosetta Tharpe recorded "That's All" in 1938 (Decca 2503B): it is "Denomination Blues" with altered words and with a different title, taken from the refrain
- Ry Cooder recorded Phillips' "Denomination Blues" on his 1971 album Into the Purple Valley and "You Can't Stop a Tattler", as "Tattler", on his album Paradise and Lunch (1974). Linda Ronstadt covered Cooder's "Tattler" arrangement on her 1976 Hasten Down The Wind album.
- "Denomination Blues" has also been recorded by the contemporary Christian groups 2nd Chapter of Acts on their 1975 live album To the Bride with Barry McGuire, and The 77s on their debut album Ping Pong over the Abyss (1983).
- Jorma Kaukonen recorded "What Are They Doing in Heaven Today" as the closing song of his 2002 album Blue Country Heart.
- Will Oldham recorded Phillips' "I Had a Good Father and Mother" on the Palace Brothers album There Is No-One What Will Take Care of You (1993). Gillian Welch also recorded this song on her 2003 album entitled Soul Journey.
- The Be Good Tanyas recorded "What are They Doing in Heaven Today" on Hello Love.
- "What Are They Doing in Heaven Today" was used in a scene in the movie, Elizabethtown, where the main character visits The Survivor Tree in Oklahoma.
- Mogwai perform a version of "What Are They Doing in Heaven Today" on the Les Revenants original soundtrack, for the French TV series of the same name.
- Phillips' "I Am Born to Preach the Gospel" features on the soundtrack of Werner Herzog's 2009 film My Son, My Son, What Have Ye Done?. It was also featured in the song "The Dyslexic Porn Star Who Funked in Her Space" by the British band Morcheeba.
- Ralph Stanley recorded Phillips' "Lift Him Up That's All" on his 2011 album A Mother's Prayer.
- Ashley Cleveland included Denomination Blues on her 2009 album God Don’t Never Change.
- In 2009, Atlas Sound sampled Phillips' "Lift Him Up That's All" for the song "Washington School" on the Logos album.
- Phillips' song "Mothers Last Word to Her Son" was featured in the film We Need to Talk About Kevin.
- Montreal-based saxophonist Colin Stetson covered "What Are They Doing in Heaven Today" on New History Warfare Vol. 3: To See More Light. The track features Bon Iver's Justin Vernon on vocals.
- Mavis Staples recorded "What Are They Doing in Heaven Today" on her 2015 EP, Your Good Fortune.
- Kate Wolf recorded "I Had A Good Father and Mother" on her 1994 live album, Looking Back At You. The track includes a spoken introduction about listening to Washington Phillips' records.
- Animal Collective do a short rendition of "I've Got the Key to the Kingdom" as a prelude to "The Purple Bottle" on the live album, Live at 9:30.
- Advance Base recorded Phillips' "Lift Him Up That's All", "Mother's Last Word to Her Son", "Train Your Child", "Paul & Silas in Jail", "I Had a Good Father & Mother", and "What a Friend We Have In Jesus" in a 2013 EP titled The World Is In a Bad Fix Everywhere
