= Exit Records =

- Founded: 1982
- Founder: Mary Neely
- Defunct: 1987
- Status: Inactive
- Distributors: A&M Records, Island Records
- Country of origin: U.S.
- Location: Sacramento, California

Exit Records was an independent record label founded in 1982 and run by Mary Neely, a veteran of the music business and a host of several national rock and roll radio shows, including Rock Scope. The label folded in 1987.

Based in a large building on the west side of Sacramento, California, Neely set up her label with the hopes of encouraging art and creativeness over commercial success. Exit began with two small releases from the 77s and Vector before signing a production and distribution deal with A&M Records and Island Records. Included in the arrangement was a promotion deal with Bill Graham Productions.

== Artists ==
- The 77s
- Charlie Peacock
- Steve Scott
- Vector

== Catalogue ==
- The 77s – Ping Pong Over the Abyss (1983, released with A&M Records)
- Steve Scott – Love in the Western World (1983, released with A&M Records)
- Vector – Mannequin Virtue (1983, released with A&M Records)
- Thomas Goodlunas and Panacea – Take Me Away (1983, released with A&M Records)
- The 77s – All Fall Down (1984, released with A&M Records)
- Charlie Peacock – Lie Down in the Grass (1984, released with A&M Records)
- First Strike – Rock of Offense (1984, released with A&M Records)
- Vector - Please Stand By (1985, released with A&M Records)
- Charlie Peacock – Charlie Peacock (1986, released with Island Records)
- The 77s – The 77s (1987, released with Island Records)
- Robert Vaughn and the Shadows – Love and War (1987, released with Island Records)

== See also ==
- List of record labels
