= Bruce Spencer =

American drummer

- Origin: United States
- Occupations: Drummer; singer; session musician; record producer; instructor
- Member of: The 77s

Bruce Spencer is an American drummer, drumming instructor and clinician, singer and session musician, songwriter, record producer, best known for his work with the rock and roll trio The 77s and Jackie Greene.

Spencer has also played the drums for artists including Wynonna Judd, Charlie Peacock, Brent Bourgeois, Larry Tagg, Roger Smith, JGB, Agnes Stone (Qwest), Zoppi (MCA), Chris Webster, Vector, MindX, Nathan Dale, Alloy Field, The Unauthorized Rolling Stones and many others.
