= The 77s =

American rock band

- Origin: Sacramento, California, U.S.
- Genres: Rock; Christian rock; Christian alternative rock; new wave
- Years active: 1979–present
- Labels: Exit; Island; Broken; Myrrh; Brainstorm Artists, Intl; Galaxy21; Fools of the World; Lo-Fidelity
- Members: Michael Roe; Mark Harmon; Bruce Spencer
- Past members: Mark Proctor; Jan Eric Volz; Mark Tootle; Aaron Smith; David Leonhardt
- Website: www.77s.com

The 77s (alternatively spelled the Seventy Sevens, the 77's, or simply 77's) is an American rock band consisting of Michael Roe on vocals/guitar, Mark Harmon on bass guitar, and Bruce Spencer on drums.

== History ==
The group was "formed at a church by a church" under the name Scratch Band in Sacramento, California, during the late 1970s according to Mike Roe. Accompanying him were Mark Tootle on guitar and keyboards, Jan Eric Volz on bass guitar, and Mark Proctor on drums. They were occasionally joined by singer Sharon McCall and guitarist Jimmy A. Their repertoire included originals and songs by English poet Steve Scott among others. The "church" that brought the players together was Sacramento's Warehouse Christian Ministries with the band being a part of the ministry’s artistic outreach, performing every weekend at the Warehouse. The name of the band was changed to the Seventy Sevens before the release of their first album, Ping Pong Over the Abyss in 1982, on WCM’s own Exit label. While the meaning of the group's name has never been revealed, it is thought to be derived from either Matt 18:22, Daniel 9 or, simply, a year – possibly 1977 – which holds some significance to the band. In 1984, the group toured with labelmate Vector and Resurrection Band with all three bands playing the very first Cornerstone festival.

When Proctor left the band, he was replaced by Aaron Smith, who appeared on the album All Fall Down (1984) and remained with the band until 1995. Smith had been a former sideman with Ray Charles and the Temptations and a member of Vector. The next album, The Seventy Sevens, was released by Island Records in 1987. While the album received favorable reviews, it did not sell as well as it might; the reason being The Joshua Tree by labelmate U2 was released that same year. In his article on the subject, John Thompson (True Tunes) thought it likely that Island put most of its resources into promoting The Joshua Tree while others on the label received less promotional support. The album received a positive review by Rolling Stone critic, Margot Mifflin: "the 77s have come up with a sound that suggests not only that they know where they’re coming from, but also that they're going places". Mark Alan Powell called it "an artistic masterpiece – probably one of the ten best albums of the year not simply in the Christian market but in rock and roll, period".

A compilation album – Sticks and Stones (1990) and a live album – 88 (1991) (which contained a manic version of Over, Under, Sideways, Down) were released after their eponymous Island Records release. At some point in 1992 Tootle and Volz left the band which left Roe as the only original member. David Leonhardt (guitar) joined in early 1992 with Mark Harmon (bass) joining that year also, replacing Tootle and Volz.

Pray Naked was released in 1992 but the title was changed by the label, Word Records, to The Seventy Sevens. The album title change would cause confusion in the minds of consumers and marketers since the 1987 album on Island bore the same name. This was followed by Drowning with Land in Sight in 1994. Leonhardt and Smith left the band soon after, with Smith being replaced by former bandmate Bruce Spencer of Vector. This change brought about a new version of the band, namely a power trio line up with Harmon, Roe and Spencer which started referring to itself as "the band that won't go away". It also brought the release of Tom Tom Blues (1995).

At the end of the 1996, the 77s started the label Fools of the World and reissued some of its albums. New material was also released following the label's formation: Echos o' Faith (1996 live acoustic material), EP (1999) and A Golden Field of Radioactive Crows (2001). Also, Scott Reams occasionally played in the band during concerts beginning in 2000.

In 2010, the 77's participated in the tribute album Mister Bolin's Late Night Revival, a compilation of 17 unreleased tracks written by Tommy Bolin.

Critically, the 77s are considered by fans and music critics; such as Dwight Ozzard (Prism magazine), Brian Quincy Newcomb (HM) and John Thompson (True Tunes), as the greatest—or "best" depending on whom one might quote, rock and roll band in the world.

== Discography ==
- 1982 Ping Pong over the Abyss
- 1984 All Fall Down
- 1987 The 77s
- 1990 Sticks and Stones
- 1991 88
- 1992 Pray Naked
- 1994 Drowning with Land in Sight
- 1995 Tom Tom Blues
- 1996 Echos o' Faith
- 1999 EP
- 2000 Late
- 2000 88/When Numbers Get Serious, re-release of 88 w/bonus disc containing various live tracks (1987–1998)
- 2001 A Golden Field of Radioactive Crows
- 2002 Direct
- 2003 Guilty Pleasures
- 2006 77s DVD Collection
- 2008 Holy Ghost Building
- 2014 Gimme a Kickstart.... (part of a two-disc set packaged with .....And a Phrase or Two by Michael Roe)
- 2025 7

=== Promotional singles ===
Year	Single	CCM Rock peak pos	Album
1983	"Renaissance Man"	1	Ping Pong over the Abyss
1983	"Ping Pong over the Abyss"	5	Ping Pong over the Abyss
1983	"A Different Kind of Light"	—	Ping Pong over the Abyss
1984	"Someone New"	18	Ping Pong over the Abyss
1984	"Mercy Mercy"	—	All Fall Down
1985	"Ba-Ba-Ba-Ba"	4	All Fall Down
1985	"Caught in an Unguarded Moment"	14	All Fall Down
1987	"Do It for Love"	13	The 77s
1987	"I Can't Get Over It"	—	The 77s
1990	"Miserable"	12	More Miserable Than You'll Ever Be
1990	"This Is the Way Love Is"	1	Sticks and Stones
1990	"M.T."	1	Sticks and Stones
1991	"You Walked in the Room"	6	Sticks and Stones
1991	"The Lust, the Flesh, the Eyes & the Pride of Life"	6	The 77s
1992	"Woody"	4	Pray Naked
1992	"Phony Eyes"	7	Pray Naked
1993	"Nuts for You"	6	Pray Naked
1994	"Snake"	1	Drowning with Land in Sight
1994	"Nobody's Fault But Mine"	3	Drowning with Land in Sight
1995	"Cold, Cold Night"	14	Drowning with Land in Sight
1996	"Rocks in Your Head"	7	Tom Tom Blues
2001	"Related"	6	A Golden Field of Radioactive Crows
2001	"Mr. Magoo"	—	A Golden Field of Radioactive Crows
2001	"Genuine"	20	A Golden Field of Radioactive Crows
"—" denotes singles that did not chart.

== 7&7iS ==
Members of the 77s have used the moniker 7&7is to release projects that they do not see as fitting under their regular band name. The name comes from "7 and 7 Is", a song by the 60s music group Love.

The name was first used for Alternative Records' 1989 collection of rarities and outtakes (later released as More Miserable Than You'll Ever Be). The name was revived in 2004 for Fun with Sound, a collaboration between lead singer Michael Roe and bassist Mark Harmon. Harmon and Roe also toured that year under the name. In 2014 a special wooden box set was released that contained a vinyl 7-inch single pressing of "Hey Little Girl" & "I Saw the Light", a T-shirt, two guitar picks, two buttons, and three CD versions of More Miserable Than You'll Ever Be including a limited two-CD version, and two special collector versions under the title Misery Loves Company. Both collector versions include different tracks.

=== 7&7iS discography ===
- 7&7iS (collector's edition box set - vinyl record, cassette, 3-inch CD, 1989)
- More Miserable Than You'll Ever Be (album, 1990)
- Fun with Sound (album, 2004)
- 7&7iS More Miserable wooden box set (2014)
- Hymnshow (album, 2021)
