= Mark Harmon (musician) =

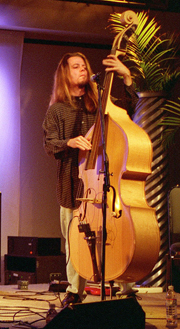
- Harmon performing on January 14, 2011

Background information
- Genres: Rock; bluegrass; jazz
- Occupations: Musician; songwriter; record producer
- Instrument: Bass guitar
- Member of: The 77s; 7&7iS

Mark Harmon is an American record producer, songwriter, and bassist, best known for his work with the rock group the 77s.

Harmon and 77s lead singer Michael Roe collaborated on the instrumental releases, DayDream and Orbis. Roe and Harmon also teamed up under the moniker 7&7iS to release their Fun with Sound album in 2004.

Harmon also currently performs with Jimmy Pailer & the Prophets, as well as being a member of Mind(X).

== 7&7iS Discography ==
- More Miserable Than You'll Ever Be, 1989, collector's edition box set
- More Miserable Than You'll Ever Be, 1990, album
- Fun with Sound, 2004, album

== Instrumental albums with Michael Roe ==
- Daydream, 1999, album, original release (re-released in 2002)
- Orbis, 2002, album
