= List of songs recorded by Blind Willie Johnson =

This is a list of all 30 songs recorded by the gospel blues musician Blind Willie Johnson (1897–1945), arranged both in alphabetical order by title and in chronological order by recording date. All were originally released by Columbia Records as 10-inch 78-rpm singles. Additional information is given in parentheses.

== Alphabetic list ==
- "Bye and Bye I'm Goin' to See the King" (December 10, 1929, New Orleans, Louisiana; Columbia 14504-D)
- "Can't Nobody Hide from God" (April 20, 1930, Atlanta, Georgia; Columbia 14556-D)
- "Church, I'm Fully Saved To-Day" (April 20, 1930, Atlanta, Georgia; Columbia 14582-D)
- "Dark Was the Night, Cold Was the Ground" (December 3, 1927, Dallas, Texas; Columbia 14303-D)
- "Everybody Ought to Treat a Stranger Right" (April 20, 1930, Atlanta, Georgia; Columbia 14597-D)
- "Go with Me to That Land" (April 20, 1930, Atlanta, Georgia; Columbia 14597-D)
- "God Don't Never Change" (December 10, 1929, New Orleans, Louisiana; Columbia 14490-D)
- "God Moves on the Water" (December 11, 1929, New Orleans, Louisiana; Columbia 14520-D)
- "I Know His Blood Can Make Me Whole" (December 3, 1927, Dallas, Texas; Columbia 14276-D)
- "I'm Gonna Run to the City of Refuge" (December 5, 1928, Dallas, Texas; Columbia 14391-D)
- "If I Had My Way I'd Tear the Building Down" ("Oh Lord if I Had My Way") (December 3, 1927, Dallas, Texas; Columbia 14343-D)
- "If It Had Not Been For Jesus" (April 20, 1930, Atlanta, Georgia; Columbia 14556-D)
- "It's Nobody's Fault but Mine" (December 3, 1927, Dallas, Texas; Columbia 14303-D)
- "Jesus Is Coming Soon" (December 5, 1928, Dallas, Texas; Columbia 14391-D)
- "Jesus Make Up My Dying Bed" (December 3, 1927, Dallas, Texas; Columbia 14276-D)
- "John the Revelator" (April 20, 1930, Atlanta, Georgia; Columbia 14530-D)
- "Keep Your Lamp Trimmed and Burning" (December 5, 1928, Dallas, Texas; Columbia 14425-D)
- "Let Your Light Shine on Me" (December 10, 1929, New Orleans, Louisiana; Columbia 14490-D)
- "Lord I Just Can't Keep From Crying" (December 5, 1928, Dallas, Texas; Columbia 14425-D)
- "Motherless Children" ("Mother's Children Have a Hard Time") (December 3, 1927, Dallas, Texas; Columbia 14343-D)
- "Praise God I'm Satisfied" (December 11, 1929, New Orleans, Louisiana; Columbia 14545-D)
- "Sweeter as the Years Roll By" (December 10, 1929, New Orleans, Louisiana; Columbia 14624-D)
- "Take Your Burden to the Lord and Leave It There" (December 11, 1929, New Orleans, Louisiana; Columbia 14520-D)
- "Take Your Stand" (December 11, 1929, New Orleans, Louisiana; Columbia 14624-D)
- "The Rain Don't Fall on Me" (April 20, 1930, Atlanta, Georgia; Columbia 14537-D)
- "The Soul of a Man" (April 20, 1930, Atlanta, Georgia; Columbia 14582-D)
- "Trouble Will Soon Be Over" (April 20, 1930, Atlanta, Georgia; Columbia 14537-D)
- "When the War Was On" (December 11, 1929, New Orleans, Louisiana; Columbia 14545-D)
- "You'll Need Somebody on Your Bond" (December 11, 1929, New Orleans, Louisiana; Columbia 14504-D)
- "You're Gonna Need Somebody on Your Bond" (April 20, 1930, Atlanta, Georgia; Columbia 14530-D)

== Alphabetic list by recording date ==
December 3, 1927, Dallas, Texas

- "Dark Was the Night, Cold Was the Ground" (Columbia 14303-D)
- "I Know His Blood Can Make Me Whole" (Columbia 14276-D)
- "If I Had My Way I'd Tear the Building Down" ("Oh Lord If I Had My Way") (Columbia 14343-D)
- "It's Nobody's Fault but Mine" (Columbia 14303-D)
- "Jesus Make Up My Dying Bed" (Columbia 14276-D)
- "Motherless Children" ("Mother's Children Have a Hard Time") (Columbia 14343-D)

December 5, 1928, Dallas, Texas

- "I'm Gonna Run to the City of Refuge" (Columbia 14391-D)
- "Jesus Is Coming Soon" (Columbia 14391-D)
- "Keep Your Lamp Trimmed and Burning" (Columbia 14425-D)
- "Lord I Just Can't Keep From Crying" (Columbia 14425-D)

December 10, 1929, New Orleans, Louisiana

- "Bye and Bye I'm Goin' to See the King" (Columbia 14504-D)
- "God Don't Never Change" (Columbia 14490-D)
- "Let Your Light Shine on Me" (Columbia 14490-D)
- "Sweeter As the Years Roll By" (Columbia 14624-D)

December 11, 1929, New Orleans, Louisiana

- "God Moves on the Water" (Columbia 14520-D)
- "Praise God I'm Satisfied" (Columbia 14545-D)
- "Take Your Burden to the Lord and Leave It There" (Columbia 14520-D)
- "Take Your Stand" (Columbia 14624-D)
- "When the War Was On" (Columbia 14545-D)
- "You'll Need Somebody on Your Bond" (Columbia 14504-D)

April 20, 1930, Atlanta, Georgia

- "John the Revelator" (Columbia 14530-D)
- "The Rain Don't Fall on Me" (Columbia 14537-D)
- "Trouble Will Soon Be Over" (Columbia 14537-D)
- "You're Gonna Need Somebody on Your Bond" (Columbia 14530-D)
- "Can't Nobody Hide from God" (Columbia 14556-D)
- "Church, I'm Fully Saved To-Day" (Columbia 14582-D)
- "Everybody Ought to Treat a Stranger Right" (Columbia 14597-D)
- "Go with Me to That Land" (Columbia 14597-D)
- "If It Had Not Been For Jesus" (Columbia 14556-D)
- "The Soul of a Man" (Columbia 14582-D)
