= The Complete Blind Willie Johnson =

Compilation album by Blind Willie Johnson
- Released: April 27, 1993
- Recorded: December 3, 1927 – April 20, 1930
- Genre: Gospel blues; gospel
- Length: 93:59
- Label: Columbia/Legacy

The Complete Blind Willie Johnson is a compilation album of all the known recordings by American gospel blues singer-guitarist Blind Willie Johnson. As part of the Roots N' Blues series, it was released jointly by Columbia Records and Legacy Recordings, on April 27, 1993. All of the tracks on the two-compact disc set were originally issued by Columbia on the then-standard two-sided 78 rpm record format.

Over the years, many of the songs were included on other compilations, such as Blind Willie Johnson – His Story (1957) and Praise God, I'm Satisfied (1977); however, this album marks the first time all of Johnson's recordings were compiled on one set. In 2013, Columbia reissued the album as The Essential Blind Willie Johnson.

== Background ==
The tracks on the album originate from five recording dates between December 3, 1927, and April 20, 1930. Johnson, who provided lead vocals and guitar accompiment, was sometimes backed by female vocalists, most commonly his first alleged wife Willie B. Harris. Blues historian Samuel Charters provided the information in album's liner booklet, correcting some biographical errors he made from his first project featuring Johnson's recordings, titled Blind Willie Johnson 1927–1930.

== Track listing ==
See List of songs recorded by Blind Willie Johnson for sessionography information.

=== Disc one ===
1. "I Know His Blood Can Make Me Whole" – 3:03
2. "Jesus Make Up My Dying Bed" – 3:12
3. "It's Nobody's Fault but Mine" – 3:09
4. "Mother's Children Have a Hard Time" – 3:21
5. "Dark Was the Night, Cold Was the Ground" – 3:20
6. "If I Had My Way I'd Tear the Building Down" – 3:08
7. "I'm Gonna Run to the City of Refuge" – 3:23
8. "Jesus Is Coming Soon" – 3:11
9. "Lord I Just Can't Keep From Crying" – 3:01
10. "Keep Your Lamp Trimmed and Burning" – 3:03
11. "Let Your Light Shine on Me" – 3:09
12. "God Don't Never Change" – 2:57
13. "Bye and Bye I'm Goin' to See the King" – 2:52
14. "Sweeter as the Years Roll By" – 2:46

=== Disc two ===
1. "You'll Need Somebody on Your Bond" – 3:05
2. "When the War Was On" – 3:02
3. "Praise God I'm Satisfied" – 3:11
4. "Take Your Burden to the Lord and Leave It There" – 2:56
5. "Take Your Stand" – 3:01
6. "God Moves on the Water" – 2:59
7. "Can't Nobody Hide from God" – 3:21
8. "If It Had Not Been For Jesus" – 3:23
9. "Go with Me to That Land" – 3:04
10. "The Rain Don't Fall on Me" – 3:18
11. "Trouble Will Soon Be Over" – 3:07
12. "The Soul of a Man" – 3:13
13. "Everybody Ought to Treat a Stranger Right" – 3:05
14. "Church, I'm Fully Saved To-Day" – 3:07
15. "John the Revelator" – 3:17
16. "You're Gonna Need Somebody on Your Bond" – 3:10
