= The Soul of a Man (album) =

Studio album by Blind Willie Johnson
- Released: 18 November 2003
- Recorded: 3 December 1927–20 April 1930
- Genre: Gospel, gospel blues, blues
- Length: 74:50
- Label: Charly Records

Professional ratings
Review scores
Source	Rating
AllMusic	4/5 stars

The Soul of a Man is an album of "twenty haunting spiritual blues songs" recorded in the late 1920s and the early 1930s by the American gospel blues singer and guitarist Blind Willie Johnson that was released by Charly Records in 2003.

All of the songs have religious themes and are notable for Johnson’s distinctive combination of a raw and powerful vocal style with a fluid and melodic slide guitar technique. Their influence can be heard in the music of Taj Mahal, Led Zeppelin and Ry Cooder. The 2003 Wim Wenders documentary film The Soul of a Man is a tribute to Johnson.

The songs were recorded for Columbia Records in Dallas, Texas, in December 1927 and December 1928, in New Orleans in December 1929 and in Atlanta, Georgia, in April 1930. Johnson ceased recording in 1930 and became a Baptist preacher. He died of malarial fever in Beaumont, Texas, in 1945, aged 48, after being forced to sleep outdoors when his home burned down.

== Cover versions ==
Taj Mahal recorded a cover version of "You're Gonna Need Somebody on Your Bond" on his 1969 album Giant Step. Led Zeppelin covered the song "It's Nobody's Fault but Mine" on their 1976 album Presence.

"Dark Was the Night, Cold Was the Ground", an instrumental that showcases Johnson's slide guitar playing, is reported to have been the inspiration for Ry Cooder's soundtrack for the 1984 Wim Wenders film Paris, Texas.

== Track listing ==
All songs written by Blind Willie Johnson except where noted.

1. "Keep Your Lamp Trimmed and Burning" (3:06)
2. "You're Gonna Need Somebody On Your Bond" (3:12)
3. "God Moves on the Water" (3:01)
4. "Jesus Is Coming Soon" (3:12)
5. "John the Revelator" (Trad.) (3:19)
6. "Dark Was the Night, Cold Was the Ground" (3:22)
7. "Trouble Will Soon Be Over" (3:09)
8. "Let Your Light Shine on Me" (3:11)
9. "It's Nobody's Fault But Mine" (3:11)
10. "The Soul of a Man" (3:15)
11. "If I Had My Way I'd Tear the Building Down" (3:10)
12. "Praise God I'm Satisfied" (3:13)
13. "I'm Gonna Run to the City of Refuge" (3:25)
14. "Can't Nobody Hide from God" (3:23)
15. "Motherless Children Have a Hard Time" (3:24)
16. "I Know His Blood Can Make Me Whole" (3:05)
17. "The Rain Don't Fall on Me" (Trad./arr. Johnson) (3:20)
18. "Sweeter as the Years Roll By" (Trad./arr. Johnson) (2:49)
19. "Jesus Make Up My Dying Bed" (3:13)
20. "Bye and Bye I'm Goin' to See the King" (Trad./arr. Johnson) (2:54)

== Personnel ==
- Blind Willie Johnson – vocals, slide guitar
- Willie (Wilhemina) B. Harris – vocals
