= American Epic: The Best of Blind Willie Johnson =

Compilation album by Blind Willie Johnson
- Released: June 16, 2017
- Recorded: 1927–1930
- Genres: Gospel, gospel blues
- Length: 51:09
- Labels: Lo-Max, Sony Legacy, Third Man

American Epic chronology
American Epic: The Best of Lead Belly (2017)	American Epic: The Best of Blind Willie Johnson (2017)	American Epic: The Best of the Memphis Jug Band (2017)

American Epic: The Best of Blind Willie Johnson is a compilation album released to accompany the award-winning American Epic documentary film series. It collects performances from Blind Willie Johnson's five recording sessions for Columbia Records in Dallas, Atlanta, and New Orleans between 1927 and 1930. The album was released as a 16-track download and a vinyl LP.

== Background ==
During production on the American Epic films it was decided to close the historical documentaries with a piece on Blind Willie Johnson and the placing of his song "Dark Was the Night, Cold Was the Ground" on a golden record fastened to the sides of the two Voyager space probes. The success of the audio restoration of "Dark Was the Night, Cold Was the Ground" inspired the filmmakers to source the best surviving masters of their favorite Johnson performances and reissue them on an album.

== Compilation ==
Blind Willie Johnson was first recorded by Columbia Records scout Frank Buckley Walker at a temporary studio in the Deep Ellum neighborhood of Dallas, Texas on December 3, 1927. Johnson performed a gospel repertoire within a blues framework. His powerful bass vocal had a unique gravelly timbre and was accompanied by his distinctive and highly influential slide guitar. On five of the performances on the album he was accompanied by the female vocal of his wife, Willie B. Harris. By his final recording session in 1930, Johnson's records, released in the midst of the Great Depression, were "selling almost twice as many copies as Bessie Smith, and three and four times as many as most of the country blues artists"

The album features gospel call and response songs like "John the Revelator", about John of Patmos, the writer of the Book of Revelation who recounts the opening of seven seals and the ensuing apocalyptic events and "Keep Your Lamp Trimmed and Burning" about the Parable of the Ten Virgins from the Gospel of Matthew, 25:1–13. It includes traditional biblical songs like "If I Had My Way, I'd Tear the Building Down" that relates the story of Samson and Delilah. It contains songs about twentieth century events like the sinking of RMS Titanic in "God Moves on the Water", songs based on hymns like "Church, I'm Fully Saved To-Day", autobiographical songs like "Mother's Children Have a Hard Time" which deals with Johnson's mother dying when he was very young and traditional gospel blues songs like "Lord I Just Can't Keep From Crying", "Trouble Will Soon Be Over" and "Praise God I'm Satisfied". It closes with his most famous composition a wordless moan accompanied by slide guitar entitled "Dark Was the Night, Cold Was the Ground" that was included by NASA on the Voyager Golden Record.

The songs featured on the compilation have been hugely influential to subsequent musicians and have been covered by Reverend Gary Davis, Son House, Sister Rosetta Tharpe, Bob Dylan, Tom Waits, Eric Clapton, Lucinda Williams, Dorothy Love Coates, Led Zeppelin, John Sebastian, Eric Burdon, The Grateful Dead, Willie Nelson, Tom Jones, Rosanne Cash, The Staples Singers, Ry Cooder, Bruce Springsteen and Nina Simone.

== Restoration ==
New sound restoration techniques developed for the American Epic film series were utilized to restore the sixteen recordings on the album. The 78rpm record transfers were made by sound engineer Nicholas Bergh using reverse engineering techniques garnered from working with the restored first electrical sound recording system from the 1920s in The American Epic Sessions. This was followed by meticulous sound restoration on these 1920s recordings, by sound engineers Peter Henderson and Joel Tefteller, to reveal greater fidelity, presence, and clarity than had been heard before.

== Release ==
The album was released on June 16, 2017, one month after the US broadcast of American Epic. The album was issued as a download by Sony Legacy and a vinyl LP by Third Man Records.

== Critical reception ==
The work was described by The Village Voice as "re-mastering I can only call profound. Performances you might think you knew sound as if you've never heard them before — never apprehended them." Ian Anderson in fRoots said "you haven't really heard these tracks at all. Not like this. Forget bad dubs of worn-out 78s pressed on poor vinyl. The 'reverse engineering' transfers by Nicholas Bergh and subsequent restorations are so startlingly better, practically everything you will ever have experienced from this era can be discounted. And there's none of that fog of 78 surface noise which many people find too much of a distraction: suddenly, legendary artists are in the room with you."

== Track listing ==
All tracks are written by Blind Willie Johnson.

No.	Title	Original Release	Length
1.	"John the Revelator"	Columbia 14530-D, 1930	3:20
2.	"It's Nobody's Fault but Mine"	Columbia 14303-D, 1927	3:13
3.	"If I Had My Way, I'd Tear the Building Down"	Columbia 14343-D, 1927	3:12
4.	"God Moves on the Water"	Columbia 14520-D, 1929	3:02
5.	"The Soul of a Man"	Columbia 14582-D, 1930	3:17
6.	"I Know His Blood Can Make Me Whole"	Columbia 14276-D, 1927	3:07
7.	"Church, I'm Fully Saved To-Day"	Columbia 14582-D, 1930	3:09
8.	"Let Your Light Shine on Me"	Columbia 14490-D, 1929	3:11
9.	"Mother's Children Have a Hard Time"	Columbia 14343-D, 1927	3:24
10.	"Lord I Just Can't Keep From Crying"	Columbia 14425-D, 1928	3:05
11.	"Trouble Will Soon Be Over"	Columbia 14537-D, 1930	3:10
12.	"Jesus Make Up My Dying Bed"	Columbia 14276-D, 1927	3:15
13.	"Bye and Bye I'm Goin' to See the King"	Columbia 14504-D, 1929	2:59
14.	"Praise God I'm Satisfied"	Columbia 14545-D, 1929	3:15
15.	"Keep Your Lamp Trimmed and Burning"	Columbia 14425-D, 1928	3:07
16.	"Dark Was the Night, Cold Was the Ground"	Columbia 14303-D, 1927	3:25
Total length:			51:09

== Personnel ==
- Blind Willie Johnson – vocals and guitar
- Willie B Harris – backing vocals (tracks 1,5,7,11,14)
- Bernard MacMahon – editor, compiler, producer
- Allison McGourty – producer
- Nicholas Bergh – 78 rpm transfers, mastering
- Peter Henderson – restoration, mastering, producer
- Duke Erikson – restoration, mastering, producer
- Joel Tefteller – restoration, mastering
- John Polito – mastering
- Ellis Burman – mastering
- Adam Block – producer
- Patrick Ferris – associate producer
- Jack McLean – associate producer
- Nat Strimpopulos – artwork
