= God Don't Never Change: The Songs of Blind Willie Johnson =

Compilation album by various artists
- Released: February 26, 2016
- Length: 41:50
- Producer: Jeffrey Gaskill

God Don't Never Change: The Songs of Blind Willie Johnson (Alligator Records) earned Grammy Award nominations for Best Roots Gospel Album and Best American Roots Performance for Blind Boys of Alabama recording of Mother's Children Have a Hard Time. The compilation was produced by Jeffrey Gaskill of Burning Rose Productions. The package features extensive historical liner notes by author Michael Corcoran.

== Background ==
The album was funded via a Kickstarter campaign that featured cigar box guitars made of wood from Willie Johnson's 1920s/1930s Marlin, Texas, home that he shared with wife Willie B Harris. These ten unique folk instruments are individually numbered and collectively known as the Blind Pilgrim Collection.

== Reception ==
Thom Jurek, in his review for AllMusic, said the album "Reflects the enduring, mercurial influence of the artist, but also the weight the Christian gospel imposes on questions of the human condition as it encounters suffering, joy, mercy, loneliness, death, and resurrection." The Associated Press praised the album saying "Producer Jeffrey Gaskill's able guidance has resulted in 11 stirring renditions which replicated the soul of the songs not just the sounds."

== Track listing ==
1. "The Soul of a Man" – Tom Waits (3:29)
2. "It's Nobody's Fault but Mine" – Lucinda Williams (3:55)
3. "Keep Your Lamp Trimmed and Burning" – Derek Trucks & Susan Tedeschi (3:12)
4. "Jesus Is Coming Soon" – Cowboy Junkies (4:17)
5. "Mother's Children Have a Hard Time" – Blind Boys of Alabama (4:42)
6. "Trouble Will Soon Be Over" – Sinead O'Connor (3:18)
7. "Bye and Bye I'm Going to See the King" – Luther Dickinson featuring The Rising Star Fife & Drum Band (3:54)
8. "God Don't Never Change" - Lucinda Williams (4:24)
9. "John the Revelator" – Tom Waits (2:50)
10. "Let your Light Shine on Me" – Maria McKee (3:59)
11. "Dark Was the Night—Cold Was the Ground" – Rickie Lee Jones (3:52)

== Personnel ==
- Executive Producers: Jeffrey Gaskill, Mila Bagry
- Produced by Jeffrey Gaskill
- Associate Producer: Michael B Borofsky
