= Georgia Street Singer =

Studio album by Blind Pearly Brown
- Released: February 1961
- Genre: Gospel blues
- Label: Folk Lyric
- Producer: Harry Oster

Blind Pearly Brown chronology
Georgia Street Singer (1961)	It's a Mean Old World to Try to Live In (1975)

Georgia Street Singer is a studio album by American gospel blues musician Pearly Brown (1915–86, vocals and guitar, active in Macon, Georgia) and was released on the Folk Lyric label in 1961. On the original release, he is credited as Blind Pearly Brown. On a re-release on the same label, and subsequently, he is credited as Reverend Pearly Brown. The album comprises 15 tracks, all of which are Brown's interpretations of known (mostly, well known) songs, all on religious topics.

== Track listing ==
Side 1

1. "God Don't Ever Change"
2. "Just a Closer Walk with Thee"
3. "You're Gonna Need That Pure Religion"
4. "Savior Don't Pass Me By"
5. "Motherless Children"
6. "Oh What a Mourning"
7. "I Must See Jesus"

Side 2

1. "Nobody's Fault but Mine"
2. "I Know It Was the Blood"
3. "By and By I'm Gonna See the King"
4. "Keep Your Lamp Trimmed and Burning"
5. "If I Never See You Anymore"
6. "Ninety-Nine and a Half Won't Do"
7. "It's a Mean Old World"
8. "The Great Speckled Bird"
