= Soul of a Man =

Soul of a Man may refer to:

- The Soul of a Man, a 2003 documentary film
- DMX: Soul of a Man, a reality television series
- Soul of a Man (Eric Burdon album), a 2006 album
- "Soul of a Man" (song), a 1930 song by Blind Willie Johnson, covered by various artists
- Soul of a Man, an album by DJ Mathematics
- Soul of a Man, an album by Knut Reiersrud
- Soul of a Man, a song by Beck off his 2008 album Modern Guilt
- The Soul of a Man (album), an album of blues songs recorded in the late 1920s and 1930 by Blind Willie Johnson, released in 2003

== See also ==
- Soul Man (disambiguation)
- Soul of a Woman (disambiguation)
- Soul of Man
