= It's a Mean Old World to Try to Live In =

Studio album by Reverend Pearly Brown
- Released: 1975
- Recorded: 1973; Americus, Georgia
- Genre: Gospel blues
- Length: 32:57 (LP) 48:49 (CD)
- Label: Rounder Records
- Producer: Bruce Kaplan, Bill Nowlin

Reverend Pearly Brown chronology
Georgia Street Singer (1961)	It's a Mean Old World to Try to Live In (1975)

It's a Mean Old World to Try to Live In is a 1975 gospel blues LP by American street-performing musician Reverend Pearly Brown (1915–86, vocals, guitar and harmonica, active in Macon, Georgia) on the Rounder label.

== Track listing ==
Side 1

1. "How Long Has It Been Since You've Been Home"
2. "The Day Is Past and Gone"
3. "It's a Mean Old World to Try to Live In"
4. "What a Time"
5. "Pure Religion"
6. "Help Me to Understand"

Side 2

1. "How About You"
2. "Nothin' but Joy"
3. "Another Child of God Gone Home"
4. "Keep Your Lamp Trimmed and Burnin'"
5. "Please Mommy Stay Home with Me"
6. "Peace Will Prevail"
7. "Goodbye"

Bonus tracks on CD re-release Rounder 82161-0221-2

These are placed between "Peace Will Prevail" and "Goodbye" in the original release order.

1. "Steal Away"
2. "You Got to Move"
3. "I Know the Lord Will Make a Way"
4. "Sometimes I Feel Like My Time Ain't Long"
5. "Motherless Children"
6. "When I Take My Vacation"
