= William J. Henry =

American hymn writer and evangelist

- Born: December 2, 1867; Ohio, U.S.
- Died: November 26, 1955 (aged 87)
- Occupations: Hymn writer, evangelist, pastor
- Known for: Leadership in the Holiness movement; author of over 300 hymns
- Notable work: "Fully Saved Today" (1911)
- Movement: Holiness movement

William J. Henry (December 2, 1867 – November 26, 1955) was an American hymn writer and evangelist.

He originated from Ohio. He was an early leader in the Holiness Movement near Boyertown, Pennsylvania. From 1889 to 1895, he toured eastern Pennsylvania and New Jersey for several months each year, holding revival meetings. In 1893, he traveled to Liverpool, England, and founded a small congregation there. He later founded a congregation in Springfield, Missouri, which he served as pastor for 13 years.

He wrote more than 300 hymns, several of which continue to be included in hymnals. Some have been translated into German and Scandinavian languages. One of his hymns, "Fully Saved Today" (1911), is the basis of the gospel blues song "Church, I'm Fully Saved To-Day" (1930) by the Texan Blind Willie Johnson.
