= Traditional gospel music =

Traditional gospel music is older forms of gospel music.

- Traditional black gospel, which originated among African-Americans in the early 20th century
- Gospel blues, whose popularity peaked in the 1940s and 1950s
- Southern gospel, also known as "white gospel"
- Bluegrass gospel, religious songs out of the bluegrass folk music traditions
