= Pearly Brown =

Reverend Pearly Brown

Background information
- Also known as: Blind Pearly Brown
- Born: Pearly Brown; August 15, 1915; Abbeville, Georgia, United States
- Died: June 28, 1986 (aged 70) Plains, Georgia, U.S.
- Genres: Gospel blues
- Occupations: Musician, evangelist
- Years active: 1939–79

Reverend (or Blind) Pearly Brown (August 18, 1915 – June 28, 1986) was an American singer and guitarist, known primarily as a street performer. He also played harmonica and accordion. Brown's repertoire included gospel blues, blues, country, and spirituals. His bottleneck style of slide guitar inspired Georgia rock and roll musicians. He performed at the Newport Folk Festival, Carnegie Hall, and—as one of the first African American performers—the Grand Ole Opry.

== Biography and legacy ==
He was born in Abbeville, Wilcox County, Georgia, and was blind from birth. While still young, he relocated with his family to Americus, Sumter County, Georgia. A schoolteacher, recognizing his determination to succeed, arranged a place for him at the Georgia Academy for the Blind in Macon, Georgia, where he completed eight years of formal education and learned Braille. After graduating, he was ordained as minister by the Friendship Baptist Church of Americus.

Brown spent the 1930s in Florida and Georgia as a minister, a bean picker, and—by 1939—as a street musician. His early career as a street musician spanned multiple Georgia cities "from Atlanta to Thomasville". He worked with other blind musicians who were the target of police harassment. Brown himself was jailed himself in Macon for singing on the street. For most of his career, Brown lived in a one-story house at 816 Ashby Street in Americus with his first wife, Willie Mae. He relied on the Trailways Bus Station to split is time between home and the larger city of Macon.

Brown's career predated, permeated, and postdated the long civil rights era. He was influenced by earlier musicians such as Blind Willie Johnson, whose recording of the song "If I Had My Way" he plays and listens to in It's a Mean Old World. He referred to spirituals like "I'm on My Way to the Canaan Land" as "slave songs." He reported that he learned these songs from his grandmother who was born into slavery and lived into the twentieth century. Recalling the physical scars of slavery, Brown recalled, "She had stripes on her as big as my finger." His children were active in the Americus Movement. In 1963, the Browns daughter, Pearl, was one of the African American children arrested for protesting segregation at the Martin Theater. She was imprisoned for weeks at the Leesburg Stockade.

Photographs and videos show him playing both six-string guitar (both conventional acoustic and resonator, often using a bottleneck) and twelve-string guitar. The 1977 documentary It's a Mean Old World captures the style of his street performance: walking slowly along the sidewalk, singing and playing, with a handwritten sign around his neck reading "I am a blind preacher. Please help me, thank you. Rev. Pearly Brown, Americus, GA". There is a collection cup attached to the neck of his guitar. Most passers-by ignore him; but one stops to put something in the cup, and to talk briefly with him.

Brown played at the Newport Folk Festival, accompanied on backing vocals by his wife, Christine; and at the Monterey Jazz Festival. In 1966, he played at Carnegie Hall, where he won a twelve-string guitar for his performance in a competition. In the early 1970s, he presented a regular weekly 15-minute program on the Macon, GA radio station WIBB. He inspired Duane Allman and Dickey Betts (both of the Allman Brothers) with his bottleneck style of slide guitar. The Allman Brothers song, "Everybody's Got a Mountain to Climb," in Where It All Begins (1994) honors Brown.

He ceased performing on the streets in 1979, due to ill health. He died in Plains Nursing Home, Plains, Georgia in 1986, and is buried in Eastview Cemetery in Americus near his home on Ashby Street. The Pearly Brown house is still owned by his descendants.

Steve Leggett, Allmusic reviewer, has called him "Quite possibl[y] the last of the great blues street singers". Charles Farmer said in the liner notes to a 2011 re-release of the 1975 album It's a Mean Old World to Try to Live In, "He played what he called the holy blues with every bit of the rawness of the rural blues and every bit of the energy of the church".

In 2010, Brown was inducted into the Georgia Music Hall of Fame.

== Discography ==
Brown recorded and released two LPs:

- 1961 – Georgia Street Singer
- 1975 – It's a Mean Old World to Try to Live In

Live performances of two of his songs, "Keep Your Lamp Trimmed and Burning" and "What a Time", with his wife Christine singing backing vocals, are included on the 1995 album Gospel at Newport. They may have been recorded in 1966.

In 2002, Arhoolie released the compilation You're Gonna Need That Pure Religion.
