= Mother's Last Word to Her Son =

Single by Washington Phillips
- Recorded: Dallas, Texas, December 2, 1927
- Genre: Gospel blues
- Length: 2:50
- Label: Columbia
- Songwriter(s): Washington Phillips
- Producer(s): Frank B. Walker

"Mother's Last Word to Her Son" is a gospel blues song written by Washington Phillips (1880–1954) and recorded by him (vocals and zither) in 1927.

The song is in strophic form, and consists of five quatrains in rhyming couplets. The mother advises her son as he leaves home to always remember Jesus. The fourth verse contains the line, "And you have a burden, He'll make them light", alluding to Christ's words in the Gospel of Matthew at 11:30:

For my yoke is easy, and my burden is light.

The same Biblical verse is alluded to in Phillips' song "Take Your Burden to the Lord and Leave It There", recorded on the same day; that song is a Christian hymn written in 1916 by Charles Albert Tindley.

In 1929, Phillips recorded a companion song, "A Mother's Last Word to Her Daughter".

== Recordings ==
- 1927 – Washington Phillips, Columbia Records single
- 2013 – Advance Base, "The World Is In a Bad Fix Everywhere"
