= When the War Was On =

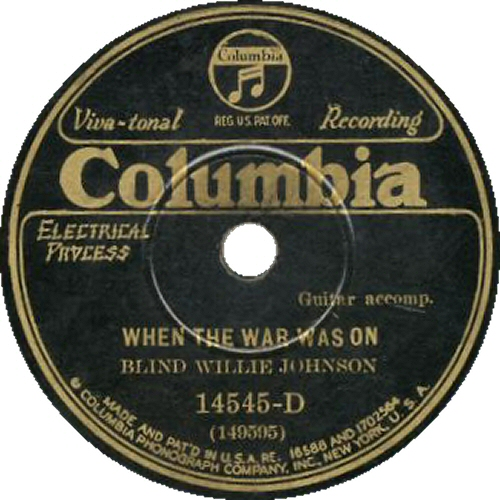

Single by Blind Willie Johnson
- Released: 1929
- Recorded: December 11, 1929, New Orleans, Louisiana
- Genre: Gospel blues
- Length: 3:04
- Label: Columbia
- Songwriter(s): Unknown

"When the War Was On" is a call and response blues song recorded in 1929 by Blind Willie Johnson and Willie B. Harris, who is thought to have been his first wife. Johnson plays bottleneck guitar, and sings throughout in his "growl" (false bass) voice; Harris sings soprano.

== Lyrics ==
The war referred to is World War I (1914–18). The lyrics reference U.S. President Wilson (1913–21) and the German Kaiser; the U.S. entered the war in 1917.

Unusually for Johnson, the song deals with a temporal rather than a spiritual subject. It shares tune and lyrics with "Everybody Help the Boys Come Home" (1927) by William and Versey Smith, husband and wife. The other side of that record by the Smiths is "When That Great Ship Went Down", which relates to the sinking of RMS Titanic. Johnson recorded his only other song on a temporal subject, "God Moves on the Water" (about the Titanic disaster), on the same day as he recorded "When the War Was On". It therefore seems likely that he knew that record.
