= Can't Nobody =

Can't Nobody may refer to:

== Music ==
=== Songs ===
- "Can't Nobody (Kelly Rowland song)", 2003
- "Can't Nobody (2NE1 song)", 2010

== Other uses ==
- "Can't Nobody Hide from God", by Blind Willie Johnson, 1930
- "Can't Nobody Hold Me Down", by Puff Daddy, 1997
- "Can't Nobody Love You (Like I Do)", by Wynonna, 1999
