= Church, I'm Fully Saved To-Day =

Single by Blind Willie Johnson
- Released: 1930
- Recorded: Atlanta, Georgia, April 20, 1930
- Genre: Gospel blues
- Length: 3:13
- Label: Columbia
- Songwriter(s): Unknown

"Church, I'm Fully Saved To-Day" is a gospel blues song recorded by Blind Willie Johnson in 1930, with backing vocals by Willie B. Harris, sometimes identified as his first wife. It was released on Columbia 14582-D, as B-side to "The Soul of a Man". The song is derived from the hymn "Fully Saved Today" by William J. Henry (words) and Clarence E. Hunter (music), published in 1911, and follows a call-and-response format.

The subject-matter is said to be Psalm 96:2, "Sing unto the Lord, bless his name; shew forth his salvation from day to day". The words of the verses of hymn and song differ, but the refrains are similar. This is the refrain of the hymn:

I am fully saved today,
I am in the narrow way;
And no evil can betide,
For I’m walking by my Savior’s side.
