= A. C. and Mamie Forehand =

American gospel musicians

A. C. Forehand
- Born: August 9, 1890 or 1893; Columbus, GA
- Died: May 9, 1972 (aged 79 or 81); Memphis, TN
- Occupation: Gospel musician
- Years active: 1927

Mamie Forehand
- Born: June 8, 1895(?); Alabama(?)
- Died: c. 1936 (aged 41); Memphis, TN
- Occupation: Gospel musician
- Years active: 1927

A. C. (also, "Asey" or "Asa") Forehand and (Blind) Mamie Forehand were husband and wife American gospel musicians. They recorded four songs for Victor Records in 1927. A. C. is credited with the two songs recorded on February 25, and Mamie with the two recorded on February 28 – according to which one of them sang, but both played on all four: A. C. guitar and harmonica, Mamie an instrument variously identified as triangle or finger cymbals.

A. C. was born in Columbus, Georgia on August 9, 1890 (according to his second wife, Frances) or 1893 (according to the Social Security Death Index). He lost his sight in 1904. Mamie is said to have been born on June 8, 1895; she too was blind. In the 1920 Census, A. C. gave his age as 29 (which is consistent with the 1890 birth date) and his profession as "None". Mamie was registered as being 23, and their daughter Rideth Mae as being three years old. The family was at that time residing in Birmingham, Alabama.

Around 1930, the family moved to Memphis, Tennessee. Mamie died; and in 1936, A. C. married Frances Forest (born July 5, 1920, in New Orleans), a blind pianist and organist. In the 1960s, the couple were active in the Church of God in Christ. A. C. died on May 9, 1972, and is buried in Rose Hill Cemetery in Memphis, in an unmarked grave. Frances outlived him.

== Discography ==
- A. C. Forehand: "I'm So Glad Today, Today", Victor 20547, released July 1927
- A. C. Forehand: "Mother's Prayer", Victor 20547
- Mamie Forehand: "Honey in the Rock" (composed by F. A. Graves), Victor 20574, released August 1927
- Mamie Forehand: "Wouldn't Mind Dying, If Dying Was All", Victor 20574
