= Soul of a Woman =

Soul of a Woman may refer to:

- Soul of a Woman (Kelly Price album), a 1998 album by Kelly Price
- Soul of a Woman (Sharon Jones & the Dap-Kings album), a 2017 album by Sharon Jones & the Dap-Kings

== See also ==
- Soul of a Man (disambiguation)
