= Take Your Stand =

Song performed by Blind Willie Johnson

Single by Blind Willie Johnson
- Released: October 1931
- Recorded: New Orleans, Louisiana, December 11, 1929
- Genre: Gospel blues
- Length: 3:02
- Label: Columbia
- Songwriter(s): Unknown

"Take Your Stand" is a gospel blues song recorded in 1929 by Blind Willie Johnson on vocals and acoustic guitar and an unidentified female singer.

Music historian Samuel Charters describes it as "another of the white gospel songs that he [Johnson] was singing during this period, and the accompaniment was the same chorded strum that he used for 'Sweeter as the Years Go By' [which was used as the record flip-side]." Charters also notes that the record was the last to be released from Johnson's New Orleans sessions (at the end of October 1931) and only 900 copies were pressed.

The lyrics contain several verses with slightly varied words. The singer exhorts the listener to "take a stand, pray for me, shake my hand, tell the truth, keep the faith, preach the Word, and run the race". He then promises to meet him or her on the Kingdom's shore. In context, the Word is the Word of God as revealed in the Bible, and the Kingdom is the Kingdom of God.
