= Boyd Rivers =

American gospel blues musician

Boyd Rivers (December 25, 1934 – November 22, 1993) was an American gospel blues singer and guitarist. He was born near Pickens in Madison County, Mississippi and started playing blues guitar at the age of 13, but three years later switched into spirituals. After moving to Canton, Mississippi he was first recorded by Alan Lomax, John Bishop and Worth Long in 1979. In 1979 he played at the Mississippi Delta Blues Festival.

He died in Jackson, Mississippi on November 22, 1993.

In 2012, an album of Rivers work that had been recorded in 1991 and 1993, You Can't Make Me Doubt, was released on Mississippi Records.
