= Everybody Ought to Treat a Stranger Right =

Single by Blind Willie Johnson
- Released: c. 1930
- Recorded: Atlanta, Georgia, April 20, 1930
- Genre: Gospel blues
- Label: Columbia
- Songwriter: Unknown

"Everybody Ought to Treat a Stranger Right" is a gospel blues song recorded in 1930 by Blind Willie Johnson with backing vocals by Willie B. Harris, who may have been his first wife. The song was released in 1930 on Columbia 14597 as B-side to "Go with Me to That Land".

In 2018, Ry Cooder recorded the song for his album The Prodigal Son. He commented that it was "one of Blind Willie Johnson’s great songs – he’s the go to guy".
