= I Know His Blood Can Make Me Whole =

Single by Blind Willie Johnson
- Released: 1928
- Recorded: Dallas, Texas, December 3, 1927
- Genre: Gospel blues
- Length: 3:03
- Label: Columbia
- Songwriter(s): Unknown

"(I Know) His Blood Can (or, Will) Make Me Whole" is a traditional gospel blues song recorded by Blind Willie Johnson in 1927. It was released on his first single, with the flip side "Jesus Make Up My Dying Bed".

As is common with traditional songs, the lyrics differ among performers. One common theme is the evil of gambling, which the singer has now forgone. The line "If I touched the hem of His garment, His blood has made me whole" alludes to the story of the woman whose issue of blood was healed by touching Jesus' garment, in the Gospel of Luke at 8:43–48. She had been ritually unclean for so long as it persisted, according to the Book of Leviticus at 15:25–27.

The song is sometimes called "Jesus' Blood Can Make Me Whole", "(I Know) His Blood Has Made Me Whole", etc. Barbecue Bob recorded the former title earlier in 1927.
