= If It Had Not Been For Jesus =

Single by Blind Willie Johnson
- Recorded: Atlanta, Georgia, April 20, 1930
- Genre: Gospel
- Length: 3:25
- Label: Columbia (14556-D)
- Songwriter: Unknown

"If It Had Not Been For Jesus" is an American Christian hymn (or, gospel song) of unknown authorship. It was included in four hymnals published between 1905 and 1938. The title is taken from the first line of the refrain. An alternative title is the first line of the first verse, namely "I Was a Deep Dyed Sinner". The song is unusual in that it is in triple metre, with three beats to the bar. That suggests that the song may have been composed by an individual whose name has been lost, rather than being ascribable only to "traditional".

The song was recorded in 1930 for Columbia Records by Blind Willie Johnson (backing vocals and guitar) with Willie B. Harris (lead vocals), who may have been his first wife.

== Recordings ==
- 1930 – Blind Willie Johnson, 10" 78prm single Columbia 14556-D
- 2004 – Leon Watson on the album We Win at the End

== Other songs ==
- 2006 – Irene Stevenson on the album Como Now: The Voices of Panola Co., Miss, a different gospel song
- "If It Had Not Been (For the Lord on My Side)", one or more different gospel songs

== See also ==
- Goodnight, Irene, a secular song to the same tune
