= Go with Me to That Land =

Single by Blind Willie Johnson
- Released: 1930
- Recorded: Atlanta, Georgia, April 20, 1930
- Genre: Gospel blues
- Length: 3:07
- Label: Columbia (14597-D)
- Songwriter: Unknown

"Go with Me to That Land" or "Come and Go with Me (to That Land)" is a traditional gospel blues song recorded on April 20, 1930 by Blind Willie Johnson with backing vocals by Willie B. Harris, who may have been his first wife. It was released as a single on Columbia 14597-D, backed with "Everybody Ought to Treat a Stranger Right".

== Lyrics ==
The lyrics express a Christian believer's expectation of a better life after this mortal one. The chorus, in call-and-response format, runs:

Come and go with me to that land (3×)
Where I'm bound

== Recordings ==
The following recordings are by people with Wikipedia articles:

- 1930 – Blind Willie Johnson
- 1960 – "Come and Go with Me to That Land" by Hally Wood on the album Hootenanny at Carnegie Hall
- 1965 – "Come and Go with Me" by Peter, Paul and Mary on the album A Song Will Rise
- 1972 – "Come and Go with Me to That Land" by Bernice Johnson Reagon on the album River of Life/Harmony: One
- 1984 – "Come and Go with Me to That Land" by Rune Larsen on the album Flammen
- 1999 – "Come and Go with Me to That Land" by Jesse L. Martin in an episode of the TV series The X-Files called "The Unnatural"
- 2013 – "Freedom Suite: Oh Freedom/Come and Go with Me to That Land/I'm on My Way to Freedom Land/Glory, Glory Hallelujah" by Sweet Honey in the Rock on the album A Tribute: Live! Jazz at Lincoln Center
