= The Rain Don't Fall on Me =

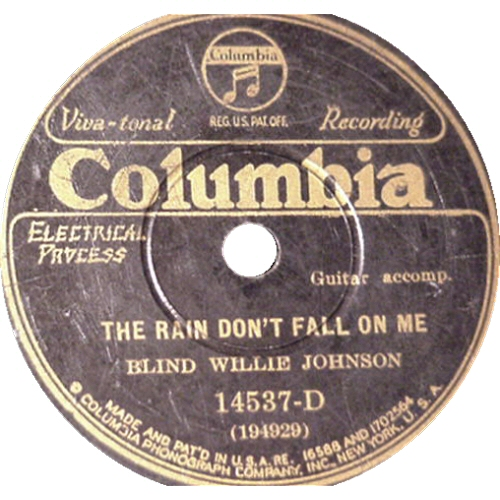

Single by Blind Willie Johnson
- Recorded: Atlanta, Georgia; April 20, 1929
- Genre: Gospel blues
- Length: 3:19
- Label: Columbia
- Songwriter(s): Traditional

"The Rain Don't Fall on Me" is a gospel blues song recorded in 1929 by Blind Willie Johnson (vocals and guitar) and Willie B. Harris (vocals), who is thought to have been Johnson's first wife.

== Other recordings ==
- 1963 – Geoff Muldaur, on his debut album, Sleepy Man Blues (1964)
- 2009 – Eden & John's East River String Band, on the album, Drunken Barrel House Blues (2009)
