= Sweeter as the Years Go By =

"Sweeter as the Years Roll By"

Single by Blind Willie Johnson
- Released: October 1931
- Recorded: New Orleans, Louisiana, December 10, 1929
- Genre: Gospel blues
- Length: 2:48
- Label: Columbia
- Songwriter: Lelia N. Morris

"Sweeter as the Years Go By" is a Christian hymn written by Lelia N. Morris in 1912. It has been included in 87 hymnals. Its subject-matter is expressed in the refrain:

Sweeter as the years go by,
Sweeter as the years go by,
Richer, fuller, deeper, Jesus’ love is sweeter,
Sweeter as the years go by

It has been recorded in various, mostly gospel, styles. In 1929, it was recorded by Blind Willie Johnson on vocals and acoustic guitar in a gospel blues style under the title "Sweeter as the Years Roll By" (even though he sings "Go" throughout). Columbia Records released the song at the end of October 1931, on n the then-standard 78 rpm record format, with "Take Your Stand" as the flip-side.
