= Soul Man =

Soul Man may refer to:

== People ==
- Soulman Alex G, nickname of professional wrestler Alex Gibson
- "Soul Man" Rocky Johnson (1944–2020), American professional wrestler
- Soulman, a memoir by Rocky Johnson with Scott Teal
- Soul music aficionado

== Music ==
- The Soul Man!, a 1966 album by Bobby Timmons
- Soul Man - Live in Japan, by Otis Clay
- Soul Man (album), a 2006 album by X Factor runner-up Andy Abraham
- "Soul Man" (song), a 1967 hit song by Sam & Dave
- "Ben l'Oncle Soul" ("Soulman"), a 2010 song by French musician Ben L'Oncle Soul

== Film and television ==
- Soul Man (film), a 1986 film starring C. Thomas Howell
- Soul Man (TV series), a sitcom starring Dan Aykroyd
- The Soul Man, a sitcom starring Cedric the Entertainer

== See also ==
- Soul Men, an American musical comedy film
- The Soulmen, a Slovak rock band
- Soul Men, alternative title of the Booker T. & the MG's album Play the 'Hip Hits'
