= John the Revelator (folk/blues song) =

1930 traditional American folk song

Single by Blind Willie Johnson
- Released: 1930
- Recorded: Atlanta, Georgia, April 20, 1930
- Genre: Gospel blues
- Length: 3:17
- Label: Columbia
- Songwriter: Not listed

"John the Revelator" is a gospel blues call and response song. Music critic Thomas Ward describes it as "one of the most powerful songs in all of pre-war acoustic music ... [which] has been hugely influential to blues performers". American gospel-blues musician Blind Willie Johnson recorded "John the Revelator" in 1930. Subsequently, a variety of artists, including the Golden Gate Quartet, Son House, Jerry Garcia Band, The White Stripes, Depeche Mode, The Forest Rangers, The Sword, The Silencers, and Santana have recorded their renditions of the song, often with variations in the verses and music.

The song's title refers to John of Patmos in his role as the author of the Book of Revelation. A portion of that book focuses on the opening of seven seals and the resulting apocalyptic events. In its various versions, the song quotes several passages from the Bible in the tradition of American spirituals.

== Blind Willie Johnson version ==
Blind Willie Johnson recorded "John the Revelator" during his fifth and final recording session for Columbia Records in Atlanta, Georgia on April 20, 1930. Accompanying Johnson on vocal and guitar is Willie B. Harris (sometimes identified as his first wife), who sings the response parts of the song. Their vocals add a "sense of dread and foreboding" to the song, along with the chorus line "Who's that a writin', John the Revelator" "repeated like a mantra".

Johnson's lyrics reference a number of passages from the Bible:

[call] Well who's that writin'? [response] John the Revelator
Who's that writin'? John the Revelator
Who's that writin'? John the Revelator
A book of the seven seals

[call] Tell me what's John writin'? [response] Ask the Revelator
What's John writin'? Ask the Revelator
What's John writin'? Ask the Revelator
A book of the seven seals

Well who art worthy, thousands cried holy
Bound for some, Son of our God
Daughter of Zion, Judah the Lion
He redeemeth, and bought us with his blood

[Repeat verses 1 & 2]

John the Revelator, great advocator
Gets 'em on the battle of Zion
Lord, tellin' the story, risin' in glory
Cried, "Lord, don't you love some I"

[Repeat verses 1 & 2]

Well Moses to Moses, watchin' the flock
Saw the bush where they had to stop
God told Moses, "Pull off your shoes"
Out of the flock, well you I choose

[Repeat verses 1 & 2]

The song was released as one of the last singles by Johnson and is included on numerous compilations, including the 1952 Anthology of American Folk Music.

== Golden Gate Quartet version ==
In 1938, the Golden Gate Quartet recorded an a capella version. It was inducted into the United States National Recording Registry in 2005, which recognizes recordings that are "culturally, aesthetically, or historically significant". The song is included on several compilation albums, such as Our Story (2001, Columbia Records).

== Son House rendition ==
Delta blues musician Son House recorded several a cappella versions of "John the Revelator" in the 1960s. His lyrics for a 1965 recording explicitly reference three theologically important events: the Fall of Man, the Passion of Christ, and the Resurrection.

[call] Who's that writin'? [response] John the Revelator
Tell me who's that writin'? John the Revelator
Tell me who's that writin'? John the Revelator
Wrote the book of the seven seals

[call] Who's that writin'? [response] John the Revelator
Tell me who's that writin'? John the Revelator
Well who's that writin'? John the Revelator
Wrote the book of the seven seals

You know God walked down in the cool of the day
Called Adam by his name
And he refused to answer
Because he's naked and ashamed

[Repeat verses 1 & 2]

You know Christ had twelve apostles
And three he led away
He said, "Watch with me one hour,
'till I go yonder and pray."

[Repeat verses 1 & 2]

Christ came on Easter morning
Mary and Martha went down to see
He said, "Go tell my disciples
To meet me in Galilee."

[Repeat verses 1 & 2]

This version was included on the 1965 album The Legendary Son House: Father of the Folk Blues (Columbia). An alternate version from the same session is found on the 1992 reissue Son House — Father of the Delta Blues: The Complete 1965 Sessions (Columbia).
