= I'm Gonna Run to the City of Refuge =

Single by Blind Willie Johnson
- Recorded: Dallas, Texas, December 5, 1928
- Genre: Gospel blues
- Length: 3:21
- Label: Columbia
- Songwriter(s): Unknown

"(I'm Gonna Run to) The City of Refuge" is a gospel blues song recorded in 1928 by Blind Willie Johnson, with backing vocals by Willie B. Harris, who may have been his first wife. It is an adaptation of the traditional song "You Better Run".

The earliest known recording of the song (titled "You Better Run") was by Wiseman Sextette, c.1923.

The title relates to the Biblical concept of Cities of Refuge, where people accused of manslaughter could escape vengeance. The chorus consists of the title, repeated several times, often in call-and-response format. The verses differ widely from one artist to another. Johnson's version refers to Saint Peter preaching; to the Holy Ghost; to Book of Revelation 12:13 ("And when the dragon saw that he was cast unto the earth, he persecuted the woman which brought forth the man child"); and to the Last Supper.

== Other recordings ==
=== "I'm Gonna Run to the City of Refuge" ===
- 2004 – 7 & 7 Is, on the album Fun with Sound

=== "City of Refuge" ===
- 1988 – Nick Cave and the Bad Seeds, on the album Tender Prey
- 2008 – The 77s, on the album Holy Ghost Building (a different version from that released in 2004 by 7 & 7 Is)
- 2011 – Abigail Washburn, on the album City of Refuge

=== "You Better Run" ===
- 1934 – Louis Washington, unreleased
- 1965 – C. J. Johnson, on the album of the same name.
- 1972 – Elvis Presley with J. D. Sumner and the Stamps, on the album Amazing Grace: His Greatest Sacred Performances
