= God Don't Never Change =

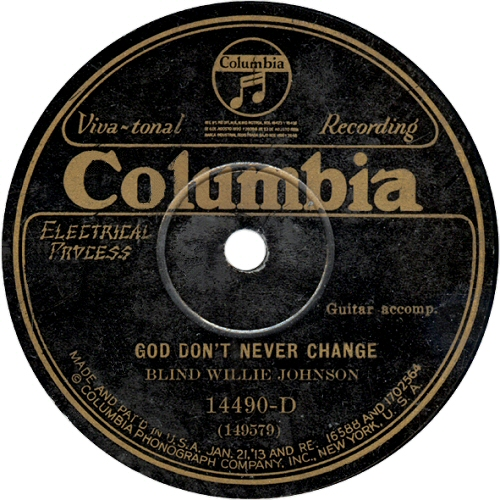

Single by Blind Willie Johnson
- Recorded: December 10, 1929
- Genre: Gospel blues
- Length: 2:59
- Label: Columbia
- Songwriter(s): Blind Willie Johnson

"God Don't Never Change" is a gospel blues song recorded by Blind Willie Johnson in 1929. The song is sometimes titled "God Don't Ever Change".

== Lyrics ==
The verses include allusions to:

- Psalm 114:4 "The mountains skipped like rams, and the little hills like lambs".
- Amen Corner, that part of a church where the most vocally devout worshipers congregate, as in the poem "Trouble in the Amen Corner".
- The influenza pandemic of 1918–20. The topicality of that event suggests that Johnson wrote at least that verse. Unless and until an earlier version can be found, he can be credited with both the tune and the words.

== Other recordings ==
- 1990 – Glenn Kaiser and Darrell Mansfield, on the album Trimmed and Burnin.
- 1991 – Russ Taff, on the album Under Their Influence
- 1994 – Tom Shaka, on the album Hot'N Spicey
- 1995 – Catfish Keith, on the album Fresh Catfish
- 1996 – "God Don't Ever Change" by Cissy Houston on the album Face To Face
- 1997 – Jimmy Vivino, on the album Do What, Now?
- 1999 – Knut Reiersrud, on the album Sub
- 2002 – Cary Hudson, on the album The Phoenix
- 2002 – Max Ochs, on the album Letter to the Editor
- 2009 – Ashley Cleveland, on the album God Don't Never Change
- 2009 – The Radiators, on the album 10/09/09 New Orleans, LA Tipitinas
- 2014 – Levon Helm Band, on the album The Midnight Ramble Sessions, Vol. 3
- 2016 – Lucinda Williams, on the various artists' album God Don't Never Change: The Songs of Blind Willie Johnson
