= Lord I Just Can't Keep From Crying =

Single by Blind Willie Johnson
- Released: June 29, 1929
- Recorded: Dallas, Texas, December 5, 1928
- Genre: Gospel blues
- Length: 3:04
- Label: Columbia; Vocalion
- Songwriter: Unknown

"Lord I Just Can't Keep From Crying" is a traditional gospel blues song recorded in 1928 by Blind Willie Johnson (vocals and guitar) and Willie B. Harris (vocals), who is thought to have been his first wife. Some versions of the song recorded by other artists have slightly different titles: for example, a comma after "Lord"; or, "Cryin'" instead of "Crying"; or, an appended "Sometime" or "Sometimes".

== Recordings ==
- 1926–27 – Rev. H. R. Tomlin
- 1966 – The Blues Project, on the album Projections, titled "I Can't Keep from Crying"
- 1967 – Ten Years After, on their 1st album, titled "I Can't Keep From Crying, Sometimes"
- 1967 – Brother Joe May, on the album Thank You Lord for One More Day
- 1994 or before – Laura Henton
- 1997 or before – Golden Gate Quartet
- 1998 – Phoebe Snow, on the album I Can't Complain
- 2004 or before – Bessie Johnson Sanctified Singers, on the compilation album Goodbye, Babylon
- 2011 – The Barr Brothers, on the album The Barr Brothers
- 2011 – Colin Stetson, on the album New History Warfare Vol. 2: Judges
- 2011 – Dave "Snaker" Ray, on the album My Blue Heaven
