= Praise God I'm Satisfied =

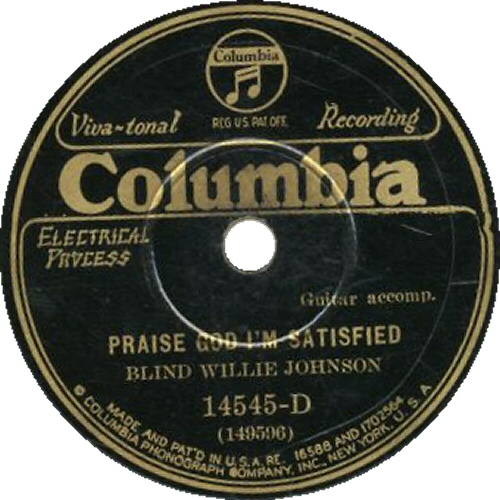

Single by Blind Willie Johnson
- Recorded: New Orleans, Louisiana, December 11, 1929
- Genre: Gospel blues
- Length: 3:13
- Label: Columbia
- Songwriter(s): Unknown

"Praise God I'm Satisfied" is a traditional gospel blues song recorded in 1929 by Blind Willie Johnson (vocals and guitar) and Willie B. Harris (vocals), who is thought to have been his first wife.

== Other recordings ==
- 2002 – K. M. Williams, on the album Blind Willie's Hymns
- 2004 – Gary Lucas and Peter Stampfel, on the album Dark Was the Night: A Tribute to the Music of Blind Willie Johnson
