= Let Your Light Shine on Me =

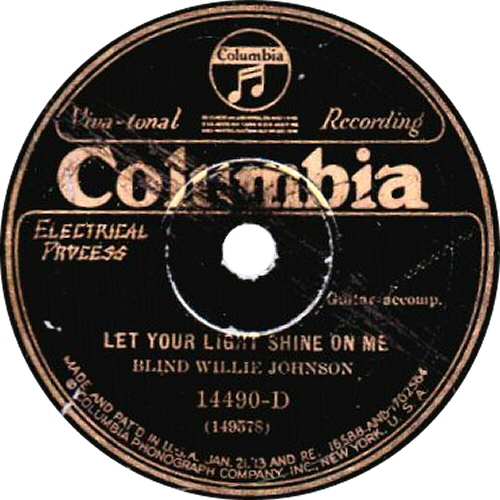

Single by Blind Willie Johnson
- Recorded: December 10, 1929
- Genre: Gospel blues
- Length: 3:11
- Label: Columbia (14490-D)
- Songwriter(s): Unknown

"Let Your Light Shine on Me" is a traditional gospel blues song, having been recorded by The Wiseman Quartet in 1923, by Ernest Phipps in 1928, and by Blind Willie Johnson in 1929. The song itself is also known as "Shine On Me", "Let It Shine on Me", "Light from the Lighthouse" and "Light from Your Lighthouse".

== Description ==
Ernest Phipps' version, like almost all early renditions, starts in a slow tempo and is then reprised at a much faster tempo. Johnson's version was released on Columbia 14490-D together with "God Don't Never Change". He starts singing in his tenor voice, then drops into his 'growl' or false bass voice for the middle section.

The chorus runs:

Let it shine on me, let it shine on me,
Let the light from your lighthouse shine on me.
Let it shine on me, let it shine on me,
Let the light from your lighthouse shine on (me).

The words appear to allude to the Gospel of Matthew at 5:16: "Let your light so shine before men, that they may see your good works, and glorify your Father which is in heaven". "Lighthouse" was a popular metaphor for heavenly light.

== Performances ==
The following recordings, which vary widely in character, are by people with Wikipedia articles:

- 1928 – "Shine On Me" by Ernest Phipps
- 1929 – Blind Willie Johnson
- 1934–49 – "(Let It) Shine on Me" by Lead Belly
- 1958 – "Light from the Lighthouse" by Lonnie Donegan feat. Miki & Griff on the album Lonnie
- 1960 – "Let the Light from the Lighthouse Shine" by Acker Bilk and His Paramount Jazz Band on the album The Seven Ages of Acker
- 1963 – "The Light from the Lighthouse" by The Seekers on the album Introducing the Seekers
- 1967 – Medley "All Too Much for Me/Take Your Burden to the Lord/Light from the Lighthouse" by The Incredible String Band from the Chelsea Demo Sessions, released in 2005 on the album From Chelsea to Toronto
- 1984 – "Light from the Lighthouse" by Kath Bloom and Loren Connors as bonus track on the double album re-release Restless Faithful Desperate / Moonlight
- 2004 – The Venice Four with Rose Stone and the Abbot Kinney Lighthouse Choir, on the soundtrack of the movie The Ladykillers
- 2008 – "Light from Your Lighthouse" by The Fireman (Paul McCartney and Youth) on the album Electric Arguments. New extended verses, based around the original chorus.
- 2009 – "Light from the Lighthouse" by The Radiators on the album 10/09/09 New Orleans, LA Tipitinas
- 2010 – "Light from Your Lighthouse" by The Black Twig Pickers and Charlie Parr on the album Glory in the Meeting House
- 2011 – "Left Lyrics in the Practice Room" on the album 90 Bisodol (Crimond) by Half Man Half Biscuit. The line "Let the light from your lighthouse shine on me" is quoted three times in the closing chorus.

Bob Dylan has played the song live, but as of January 2015 not recorded it.

== Unrelated songs with related titles ==
- 1950 – "Shine on Me" by The Soul Stirrers on the album Shine on Me. The opening line is "I wonder if the lighthouse will shine on me", but the remainder of the song differs from the subject of this article
- 1987 – "Let the Light (Shine on Me)" by the band Triumph on the album Surveillance
- 2002 – "Let the Light Shine Down" by The Country Gentlemen on the album Let the Light Shine Down
- 2003 – "Let the Light Shine In" by DJ Tiësto on the album Nyana
- 2004 – "Let Your Light Shine on Me" by Smokey Robinson on the album Food for the Spirit
- 2017 – "Shine on Me" by Dan Auerbach on the album Waiting on a Song

== See also ==
- "Midnight Special", a secular variant of the same song
