= Can't Nobody Hide from God =

Single by Blind Willie Johnson
- Released: 1930
- Recorded: Atlanta, Georgia, April 20, 1930
- Genre: Gospel blues
- Length: 3:24
- Label: Columbia (14556-D)
- Songwriter(s): Unknown

"Can't Nobody Hide from God" is a traditional gospel blues song recorded in 1930 by Blind Willie Johnson (vocals and guitar) with by Willie B. Harris (backing vocals), who is thought to have been his first wife. It was released as a single on Columbia Records, backed with "If It Had Not Been For Jesus"

The lyrics consist of the song title repeated multiple times, with added examples of people from whom you might be able to hide - such as your brother, your sister, the preacher, or the deacon. The song has been popular among practitioners of snake handling in Appalachia.

== Recordings ==
Recordings by people with Wikipedia articles include:

- 1930 – Blind Willie Johnson
- 1996 – Duster Bennett, on the album Blue Inside
