= Trouble Will Soon Be Over =

Single by Blind Willie Johnson
- Released: 1930
- Recorded: Atlanta, Georgia, April 20, 1929
- Genre: Gospel blues
- Length: 3:14
- Label: Columbia
- Songwriter: Unknown

"Trouble (in the Land) Will Soon Be Over" is a traditional gospel blues song recorded in 1929 by Blind Willie Johnson (voice and guitar) and Willie B. Harris (backing vocals), who is thought to have been his first wife.

== Lyrics ==
"Trouble" is this earthly life; the singer looks forward to a better, heavenly, one: "Trouble will soon be over, sorrow will have an end".

The singer reflects that God was a friend to the Biblical King David, and hopes for like treatment: "I'll gauge that the same God that David served will give me rest some day".

One verse includes the words "I'll take this yoke upon me". It alludes to the Biblical verse Matthew 11:30 "For my yoke is easy, and my burden is light". The yoke is in this instance a carrying pole, designed to assist people with heavy loads.

== Other recordings ==
- 1959–66 – Dorothy Love Coates (exact year uncertain as of 2015)
- 2000 – Geoff Muldaur on the album Password
- 2001 – Chris Thomas King
- 2016 – Sinéad O'Connor on the album God Don't Never Change: The Songs of Blind Willie Johnson
