= It's Nobody's Fault but Mine =

1927–1928 single by Blind Willie Johnson

Single by Blind Willie Johnson
- Released: 1927–1928
- Recorded: Dallas, Texas, December 3, 1927
- Genre: Gospel blues
- Length: 3:09
- Label: Columbia
- Songwriter: Blind Willie Johnson

"It's Nobody's Fault but Mine" or "Nobody's Fault but Mine" is a song first recorded by gospel blues artist Blind Willie Johnson in 1927. It is a solo performance with Johnson singing and playing slide guitar. The song has been interpreted and recorded by numerous musicians in a variety of styles, including Led Zeppelin on their 1976 album Presence.

== Lyrics and composition ==
"It's Nobody's Fault but Mine" tells of a spiritual struggle, with reading the Bible as the path to salvation, or, rather, the failure to read it leading to damnation. Johnson was blinded at age seven when his stepmother threw a caustic solution and his verses credit his father, mother, and sister with teaching him how to read. The context of this song is strictly religious. Johnson's song is a melancholy expression of his spirit, as the blues style echoes the depths of his guilt and his struggle. An early review called the song "violent, tortured and abysmal shouts and groans and his inspired guitar playing in a primitive and frightening Negro religious song".

In performing the song, Johnson alternated between vocal and solo slide-guitar melody lines on the first and second or sometimes third and fourth strings. Eric Clapton commented: "That's probably the finest slide guitar playing you'll ever hear. And to think that he did it with a penknife, as well." Johnson's guitar is tuned to an open D chord with a capo on the first fret and he provides an alternating bass figure with his thumb.

== Recording and release ==
"It's Nobody's Fault but Mine" was one of the first songs recorded by Johnson for Columbia Records. The session took place in Dallas, Texas, on December 3, 1927. Columbia released it as his second single on the then-standard 78 rpm record format, with "Dark Was the Night, Cold Was the Ground" as the second side. In the 1930s, the single was also issued by Vocalion Records and other labels. In 1957, the song was included on the Folkways Records' compilation album Blind Willie Johnson – His Story, with narration by Samuel Charters. (Note: Blind Willie Johnson – His Story, Folkways Records FS 3585.) Over the years, it has been included on numerous Johnson and blues compilations, including The Complete Blind Willie Johnson (1993), the comprehensive CD set of his recordings for Columbia.

== Adaptations ==
"It's Nobody's Fault but Mine" is one of Johnson's most interpreted songs. Many artists have recorded it as "Nobody's Fault but Mine" as well as the original title, with the songwriting credits including Blind Willie Johnson, public domain, and traditional. AllMusic notes renditions by:

- John Renbourn – Another Monday ("standout [for] his bottleneck playing")
- Nina Simone – Nina Simone and Piano! ("makes her own [a] radically different (though similarly fatalistic) composition")
- Ry Cooder – The Prodigal Son ("resonate[s] with conviction and gritty determination")
- Grateful Dead – Birth of the Dead ("compact arrangement [that] hearken[s] back to the earlier material")
- Eric Bibb – Booker's Guitar ("spectacular rendition of the Blind Willie Johnson classic")
- Bill Frisell – Beautiful Dreamers ("forlorn, wary blues ... stretched to the breaking point")
- Lucinda Williams – God Don't Never Change: The Songs of Blind Willie Johnson ("delivers ... the oft-covered "Nobody's Fault but Mine" convincingly with her own band")

Clapton considered recording it: "One of his [Blind Willie Johnson's] songs that I would like to have done is 'Nobody's Fault but Mine', but it is almost impossible to play. I dare you to find a slide player who can do that!"

== Led Zeppelin rendition ==
"Nobody's Fault but Mine"

Song by Led Zeppelin

from the album Presence
- Released: March 31, 1976
- Recorded: November 1975
- Studio: Musicland, Munich, Germany
- Genre: Rock; hard rock; blues rock
- Length: 6:15 (Note: The original 1976 Swan Song Records album shows a duration of "6.15". The 1994 remastered CD and the 2015 deluxe reissues show "6:27".)
- Label: Swan Song
- Songwriters: Jimmy Page; Robert Plant; (credited, see text)
- Producer: Jimmy Page

English rock band Led Zeppelin recorded a rendition titled "Nobody's Fault but Mine" for their seventh studio album Presence (1976). Adapted from Blind Willie Johnson's song, the lyrics represent a more secular theme, with an electric rock music backing.

Led Zeppelin releases list the songwriters as guitarist Jimmy Page and singer Robert Plant, however, group chronicler Dave Lewis commented: "The Page/Plant credit here is misleading as Blind Willie Johnson may well have been under the impression that he wrote the lyrics back in 1928, a fact that Robert acknowledged when introducing the track on stage in Copenhagen in 1979."

=== Background ===
In an interview, Page explained that Plant wanted to record Johnson's song, so he developed a new musical arrangement, while Plant retained some of the original lyrics. However, Led Zeppelin biographer George Case maintains that Page was probably influenced by John Renbourn's 1966 acoustic version of the song. (Note: Renbourn's version is found on his 1967 album Another Monday, sometimes with a songwriting credit to New Orleans jazz musician Bunk Johnson.)

Led Zeppelin further developed and recorded the song during the difficult period they faced after Plant's 1975 automobile accident in Rhodes. The incident left him with serious injuries to his ankle and leg and there was fear that he might not recover completely. The group recorded Presence in November 1975 at the Musicland Studios in Munich, Germany, while Plant was largely confined to a wheel chair.

=== Lyrics and composition ===
Lyrically, "Nobody's Fault but Mine" has been compared to Robert Johnson's "Hell Hound on My Trail". Johnson's 1937 Delta blues song tells of a man trying to stay ahead of the evil which is pursuing him, but it does not address the cause or lasting solution for his predicament. In Blind Willie Johnson's "It's Nobody's Fault but Mine", the problem is clearly stated: he will be doomed, unless he uses his abilities to learn (and presumably live according to) biblical teachings. Led Zeppelin retain Blind Willie's admission that he ultimately is to blame, but add Robert Johnson's sense of despair. However, they shift the focus from religion to a more contemporary one. Their lyrics include "that monkey on my back", a commonly used reference to addiction, and "the devil he told me to roll, how to roll the line tonight"; to overcome, Plant concludes "gonna change my ways tonight".

"Nobody's Fault but Mine" follows a call-and-response structure, with Page's updated slide guitar adaptation. Page triple-tracked his guitar intro; playing one guitar an octave higher than the others and using a phaser. Plant adds a blues-style harmonica solo mid-song. Drummer John Bonham and bassist John Paul Jones maintain the rhythm of the song, adding some syncopated accents during repetitions of the introductory phrase. Record producer Rick Rubin described the song's structure as "A traditional blues, twisted through a trippy, psychedelic filter. They [Led Zeppelin] played with such precision, doing these odd arrangements that sound like loose jams but are really choreographed."

=== Live performances ===
Beginning with the Led Zeppelin North American Tour 1977, "Nobody's Fault but Mine" became a regular component of Led Zeppelin concerts, with performances at nearly every show up to the group's final tour of Europe in 1980. A live version was filmed and recorded at Knebworth in 1979 and is included on the 2003 Led Zeppelin DVD. Their performance of the song with Jason Bonham at the Ahmet Ertegun Tribute Concert at the O2 Arena, London on December 10, 2007, was released in 2012 on the concert film Celebration Day. At the 2007 O2 performance, Plant joked that they first heard the song in a Mississippi church in 1932.

=== Reception ===
In a contemporary review for Presence, Stephen Davis of Rolling Stone described "Nobody's Fault but Mine" as a "strong" song, showcasing an example of "fine rock" on Presence. In a retrospective review of Presence (Deluxe Edition), Andrew Doscas of PopMatters gave "Nobody's Fault but Mine" a positive review, describing the track as "a behemoth made from bone-crunching basslines, a maniacal harmonica solo, and its memorable 'call-and-response' structure." Reviewing the track in detail, Doscas stated it "serves as a paradigm for the state of the band’s reputation, as well as the album Presence. It’s a heavy, blues-rock track that like an avalanche grinds down everything in its path." In another retrospective review for the reissue of Presence, Mark Richardson of Pitchfork gave "Nobody's Fault but Mine" a positive review, praising John Paul Jones' bass syncs with John Bonham's kick drum patterns. Richardson further described the song as a "stop/start masterpiece".

=== No Quarter version ===
In 1994, Jimmy Page and Robert Plant recorded an acoustic arrangement of "Nobody's Fault but Mine". It was released on their No Quarter album, that featured their interpretations of Led Zeppelin songs using different instrumentation and backing musicians. Their new arrangement also includes the "got a Bible in my home" line from Blind Willie Johnson's 1927 original.

== See also ==
- List of cover versions of Led Zeppelin songs
- List of Led Zeppelin songs written or inspired by others

== Bibliography ==
- Case, George (2011). Led Zeppelin FAQ: All That's Left to Know About the Greatest Hard Rock Band of All Time. Milwaukee, Wisconsin: Backbeat Books. ISBN 978-1617130717.
- Charters, Samuel (1993). The Complete Blind Willie Johnson (CD booklet). Blind Willie Johnson. New York City: Columbia Records/Legacy Recordings. C2K 52835.
- Davis, Stephen (1985). Hammer of the Gods: The Led Zeppelin Saga. New York City: Ballantine Books. ISBN 0-345-33516-3.
- Forte, Dan (2010) [From an interview in Guitar Player in August 1988]. ""I Don't Feel I Have Anything to Prove, and I Still Enjoy the Work"". In Molenda, Mike (ed.). Clapton, Beck, Page. Milwaukee, Wisconsin: Backbeat Books. ISBN 978-0879309756.
- Gioia, Ted (2008). Delta Blues (Norton Paperback 2009 ed.). New York City: W. W. Norton. ISBN 978-0-393-33750-1.
- Lewis, Dave (2012). From a Whisper to a Scream: The Complete Guide to the Music of Led Zeppelin. London: Omnibus Press. ISBN 978-0857127884.
- Popoff, Martin (2017). Led Zeppelin: All the Albums, All the Songs. MBI. ISBN 978-0760352113.
- Shadwick, Keith (2005). Led Zeppelin: The Story of a Band and Their Music 1968–1980 (1st ed.). San Francisco: Backbeat Books. ISBN 0-87930-871-0.
- Sullivan, Steve (2017). Encyclopedia of Great Popular Song Recordings, Volume 3. Lanham, Maryland: Rowman & Littlefield. ISBN 978-1442254497.
- Tolinski, Brad (2012). Light and Shade: Conversations with Jimmy Page. New York City: Crown Publishing Group. ISBN 978-0307985736.
- Welch, Chris (2005). Led Zeppelin: Dazed and Confused: The Stories Behind Every Song (2nd ed.). London: Omnibus Press. ISBN 1-56025-818-7.
