= Soul of a Man (song) =

Song first recorded by Blind Willie Johnson in 1930

"The Soul of a Man"

Single by Blind Willie Johnson
- Released: 1930
- Recorded: Atlanta, Georgia, April 20, 1930
- Genre: Gospel blues
- Length: 3:13
- Label: Columbia
- Songwriter(s): Unknown

"(The) Soul of a Man" is a gospel blues song recorded by Blind Willie Johnson in 1930. As with most of Johnson's songs, it deals with a spiritual theme within a blues musical framework. Accompanying Johnson (vocal and guitar) is Willie B. Harris, sometimes identified as his first wife, who sang harmony on the refrain:

Well won't somebody tell me
Answer if you can!
I want somebody to tell me
Just what is the soul of a man?

The song was released during the Depression "when the mood of the country had darkened" and in 1930, Johnson's records, with their religious themes, were "selling almost twice as many copies as Bessie Smith, and three and four times as many as most of the country blues artists".

"The Soul of a Man" was the second to the last of Blind Willie Johnson's singles. The song is included on several Johnson compilation albums, such as The Complete Blind Willie Johnson (1993) and The Soul of a Man (2003). "Soul of a Man" has been recorded by various artists, usually with variations in the musical accompaniment.
