= Bye and Bye We're Going to See the King =

"Bye and Bye I'm Goin' to See the King"

Single by Blind Willie Johnson
- Released: 1930
- Recorded: New Orleans, Louisiana, December 10, 1929
- Genre: Gospel blues
- Length: 2:53
- Label: Columbia
- Songwriter: Unknown

"Bye and Bye We're (or, I'm) Going to See the King" is a Christian song from the African-American musical tradition. It is known by a variety of titles, including "I Wouldn't Mind Dying (If Dying Was All)" and "A Mother's Last Word to Her Daughter". It was recorded seven times before 1930, using the preceding titles.

It has been most often recorded in gospel or gospel blues style, but also in other styles such as country.

== Description ==
The song consists of several four-line verses (quatrains) and a repeated refrain. The words of both verses and refrain often differ from one artist to another. A standard feature is that the refrain consists of four lines, the first three of which are identical. Common variants of those three lines include "Bye and bye we're (or, I'm) going to see the King" and "Holy, holy, holy is His name". The fourth line almost always begins "(I) wouldn't (or, don't) mind dying". It concludes in various ways in different versions, for example "If dying was all", or "But I gotta go by myself", or "Because I'm a child of God".

"The King" is a title of the Christian God. Many versions include a verse which refers to the vision of the chariot in the Book of Ezekiel, Chapter 1. A line found in many versions, "He said he saw him coming with his dyed garments on", alludes to the Book of Isaiah at 63:1:

Who is this that cometh from Edom, with dyed garments from Bozrah?

"A Mother's Last Word to Her Daughter"

Single by Washington Phillips
- Released: 1930
- Recorded: Dallas, Texas, December 2, 1929
- Genre: Gospel blues
- Length: 3:06
- Label: Columbia
- Songwriter: Washington Phillips
- Producer: Frank B. Walker

Titles like "Bye and Bye We're Going to See the King" and "I Wouldn't Mind Dying (If Dying Was All)" are taken from the refrain. The title of the 1929 version by Washington Phillips, "A Mother's Last Word to Her Daughter", whose verses differ markedly from other versions, was presumably chosen to indicate that he intended it as a companion song to his "Mother's Last Word to Her Son" of 1927. Blind Mamie Forehand's 1927 performance of "I Wouldn't Mind Dying If Dying Was All" has been reissued on various Washington Phillips compilations, so Phillips is often confused to be the performer. YouTube has multiple videos doing just this, but Phillips never recorded this song, only his adaptation, "A Mother's Last Word to Her Daughter".

== Recordings ==
- 1926 – Arizona Dranes, "Bye and Bye We're Going to See the King" 10-inch 78 rpm single Okeh 8438-B
- 1927 – Blind Mamie Forehand, "Wouldn't Mind Dying If Dying Was All" 10-inch 78 rpm single Victor 20574-A
- 1927 – Norfolk Jubilee Quartet, "I Wouldn't Mind Dying If Dying Was All" 10-inch 78 rpm single Paramount 12630-B
- 1928 – Golden Leaf Quartet, "I Wouldn't Mind Dying" 10-inch 78 rpm single Brunswick 7050
- 1928 – Rev. I. B. Ware with Wife and Son, "I Wouldn't Mind Dying (but I Gotta Go by Myself)" 10-inch 78 rpm single Vocalion 1235 Note: This performance credits "wife" as the vocal accompaniment to Ware. The female vocals sound identical to Blind Mamie Forehand's vocals on her 1927 release so she may be the "wife" in the credits.
- 1929 – Blind Willie Johnson, "Bye and Bye I'm Goin' to See the King" 10-inch 78 rpm single Columbia 14504-D
- 1929 – Washington Phillips, "A Mother's Last Word to Her Daughter" 10-inch 78 rpm single Columbia 14511-D
- 1932 – Carter Family, "I Wouldn't Mind Dying" 10-inch 78 rpm single Victor 23807
- 1939 – Carter Family, "I Wouldn't Mind Dying" radio broadcast
- 1939 – Smith Casey, "I Wouldn't Mind Dying If Dying Was All"
- 1939 – The Dixie Hummingbirds, "Wouldn't Mind Dying" 10-inch 78 rpm single Decca 7667
- 1956 – Dorothy Love Coates and the Original Gospel Harmonettes, "I Wouldn't Mind Dying" on the album Get on Board
- 1961 – Reverend Pearly Brown, "By and By (I'm Gonna See the King)" on the album Georgia Street Singer
- 1965 – Mississippi Fred McDowell, "Bye and Bye"/"Wouldn't Mind Dying"
- 1974 – Ronnie Lane with his band Slim Chance "Bye and Bye (Gonna See the King)" on the album 'Anymore For Anymore'
- 1981 – Flora Molton and the Truth Band, "Bye and Bye I'm Going To See the King" on the album Living Country Blues USA, Vol. 3
- 1986 – R. Stevie Moore, "I Wouldn't Mind Dyin'" on the album Glad Music
- 1994 – Ben Harper, hidden track on the album Welcome to the Cruel World
- 2002 – K. M. Williams, "Bye and Bye, I'm Goin' to See the King" on the album Blind Willie's Hymns
- 2003 – John and Heidi Cerrigione, "A Mother's Last Word to Her Daughter" on the album Wood Stoves and Bread Loaves
- 2003 – Davis Coen, "Bye and Bye I'm Goin' to See the King" on the album Cryin' the Blues
- 2004 – Crush Collision Trio, "Bye and Bye I'm Going to See the King" on the album Cold in Hand
- 2005 – Flat Mountain Girls, "Wouldn't Mind Dyin'" on the album Honey Take Your Whiskers Off
- 2006 – Catfish Keith, "Bye and Bye, I'm Going to See the King" on the album Rolling Sea
- 2007 – Francesco Garolfi, "Bye and Bye, I'm Going to See the King" on the album The Blues I Feel
- 2009 – Catfish Keith, "By and By I'm Going to See the King" on the album Live at the Half Moon
- 2010 – Heaven And, "Bye and Bye I'm Going To See the King " on the album Bye and Bye I'm Going To See the King
- 2010 – Willie Salomon, "By and By I'm Gonna See the King" on the album Let Your Light Shine
- 2011 – Catfish Keith, "By and By, I'm Going to See the King" on the album A True Friend Is Hard to Find: Gospel Retrospective
- 2012 – Ryan McGiver, "I Wouldn't Mind Dying" on the album Troubled in Mind

== Other songs ==
These songs have similar titles to the song which is the subject of this article, but are different from it and from each other:

- 2010 – Jason Moon, "I Wouldn't Mind Dying Now" on the album Naked Under All These Clothes
- "Bye and Bye When the Morning Comes"/"We'll Understand It Better Bye and Bye", a different gospel song
- "We Shall See the King (When He Comes)", a different gospel song

== See also ==
- Ezekiel Saw the Wheel, a different gospel song which relates to the same passage in the Book of Ezekiel
