= In My Time of Dying =

1928 single by Blind Willie Johnson

"Jesus Make Up My Dying Bed"
- Original 1928 78-rpm record

Single by Blind Willie Johnson
- Released: 1928
- Recorded: Dallas, Texas, December 3, 1927
- Genre: Gospel blues
- Length: 3:12
- Label: Columbia
- Songwriter: Unknown

"In My Time of Dying" (also called "Jesus Make Up My Dying Bed" or a variation thereof) is a gospel music song by Blind Willie Johnson. The title line, closing each stanza of the song, refers to a deathbed and was inspired by a passage in the Bible from Psalms 41:3 "The Lord will strengthen him upon the bed of languishing, thou wilt make all his bed in his sickness". Numerous artists have recorded variations, including Bob Dylan and Led Zeppelin.

== Early versions ==
The lyrics "Jesus goin' a-make up my dyin' bed" appear in historian Robert Emmet Kennedy's Mellows – A Chronicle of Unknown Singers published in 1925, on Louisiana street performers, and also listed in the Cleveland Library's Index to Negro Spirituals. The variation "He is a Dying-bed maker" appears in the song "When I's Dead and Gone" as transcribed in 1924 or 1925 in the south-east. A close theme in English hymnary is found in Isaac Watts, and many derivative hymnals. In October 1926, Reverend J. C. Burnett recorded "Jesus Is Going to Make Up Your Dying Bed", but it was never issued. Blind Willie Johnson may have heard Burnett's song or otherwise learned some of his lyrics.

Blind Willie Johnson recorded the song during his first recording session on December 3, 1927, as "Jesus Make Up My Dying Bed" and the second take was released as his first single in 1928, backed by "I Know His Blood Can Make Me Whole". Johnson performed the song as a gospel blues with his vocal and slide guitar accompaniment, using an open D tuning with a capo resulting in a pitch of E flat. An initial pressing of 9,400 records showed Columbia's confidence in the song, who normally released fewer records for major stars such as Bessie Smith. A later pressing of 6,000 was very large for a debut and it was one of Johnson's most successful records.

In 1928, Rev. B.J. Hill and the Jubilee Gospel Team recorded "Lower My Dying Head" (Note: QRS Records no. R7015) as an a cappella song. In December 1929, Charlie Patton recorded a version with somewhat different lyrics as "Jesus Is A-Dying Bed Maker". (Note: Paramount Records no. 12986-A) On August 15, 1933, Josh White recorded the song as "Jesus Gonna Make Up My Dying Bed". (Note: Banner Records no. 32859) White later recorded it between 1944 and 1946 as "In My Time of Dying", which inspired several popular versions.

In 1932, Martha Emmons published a nine-stanza, nine-refrains, version that she heard in Waco, Texas, under the title "Tone de Bell Easy". Two years later John and Alan Lomax printed a composite with 11 stanzas and 9 refrains.

== Bob Dylan version ==
The song gained greater prominence in popular music when Bob Dylan included a version (along with several others dealing with the subject of death) on his 1962 eponymous debut album. The song, closest to Josh White's version, had a slightly different name on the Dylan album, "In My Time of Dyin'".

According to the album liner notes:

Dylan had never sung "In My Time of Dyin'" prior to this recording session. He does not recall where he first heard it. The guitar is fretted with the lipstick holder makeshift slide he borrowed from girlfriend, Suze Rotolo, who sat devotedly and wide-eyed through the recording session.

== Led Zeppelin version ==
"In My Time of Dying"

Song by Led Zeppelin

from the album Physical Graffiti
- Released: February 24, 1975
- Recorded: 1974
- Studio: Headley Grange, Headley, England; Olympic, London
- Genre: Blues rock; hard rock
- Length: 11:08
- Label: Swan Song
- Songwriters: John Bonham; John Paul Jones; Jimmy Page; Robert Plant
- Producer: Jimmy Page

Led Zeppelin's "In My Time of Dying" was released on their sixth album Physical Graffiti in 1975. The album credits list the four group members as the song's authors, despite the earlier released renditions by Johnson, White, and Dylan. At a little over 11 minutes, it is the longest studio track by the group.

For the recording, Jimmy Page uses an open A-chord tuning and John Paul Jones plays a fretless bass. John Bonham's drums were recorded with a distinctive reverb effect, in the same manner as on the track "When the Levee Breaks" from Led Zeppelin's fourth album. Record producer Rick Rubin has remarked on the song's structure, "The bass line in the fast grooves is so interesting and unexpected. It keeps shifting gears, over and over."

=== Performances ===
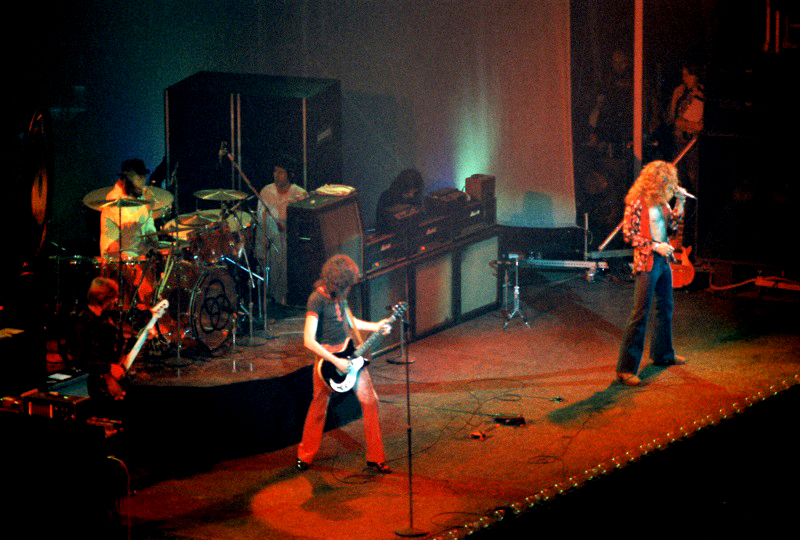
Led Zeppelin performing "In My Time of Dying" live at Chicago Stadium, January 1975

Led Zeppelin performed "In My Time of Dying" during the 1975 and 1977 concert tours, where Robert Plant sarcastically dedicated the song to the British Labour Party's Chancellor of the Exchequer, Denis Healey, for the tax exile issues the band was facing. Although performed in 1977, Plant initially was not keen on singing the song after suffering a near-fatal car crash in 1975, due to its fatalistic lyrical theme. This was one of the few live songs where Page switched to his black and white Danelectro Shorthorn guitar, which he also used for "White Summer" and "Kashmir". One live version of "In My Time of Dying", from Led Zeppelin's performance at Earls Court on May 24, 1975, is featured on the Led Zeppelin DVD, and its promotional sampler on the Mothership compilation.

In 1993, when Page toured Japan with David Coverdale as Coverdale•Page, they performed the song on all seven of their dates. Page performed this song on his tour with the Black Crowes in 1999. A version of "In My Time of Dying" performed by Page and the Black Crowes is on the album Live at the Greek. Page also included the song as part of his solo Outrider tour. "In My Time of Dying" was performed at Led Zeppelin's reunion show at the O2 Arena, London on December 10, 2007.

=== Reception ===
In a retrospective review of Physical Graffiti (Deluxe Edition), Jon Hadusek of Consequence of Sound gave "In My Time of Dying" a positive review, calling the track one of Physical Graffiti's finest moments. Hadusek believed the track "descends into a droning blues that sounds exactly like its title." In another retrospective review of Physical Graffiti (Deluxe Edition), Mark Richardson of Pitchfork described "In My Time of Dying" as Zeppelin's "ultimate blues deconstruction, mixing the open-chord slide of acoustic Delta blues with electric heaviness and extending the whole thing past 11 minutes."

== See also ==
- List of cover versions of Led Zeppelin songs
- List of Led Zeppelin songs written or inspired by others

== Bibliography ==
- Case, George (2007). Jimmy Page: Magus, Musician, Man – An Unauthorized Biography. New York City: Hal Leonard. ISBN 978-1-4234-0407-1.
- Case, George (2011). Led Zeppelin FAQ: All That's Left to Know About the Greatest Hard Rock Band of All Time. Milwaukee, Wisconsin: Backbeat Books. ISBN 978-1617130717.
- Charters, Samuel (1993). The Complete Blind Willie Johnson (CD booklet). Blind Willie Johnson. New York City: Columbia Records/Legacy Recordings. C2K 52835.
- Emmons, Martha (1932). "Tone the Bell Easy". Publications of the Texas Folklore Society. 10. J. Frank Dobie (ed.).
- Kennedy, Robert Emmet (1924). Black Cameos. A. & C. Boni.
- Kennedy, Robert Emmet (1925). Mellows: A Chronicle of Unknown Singers. A. and C. Boni.
- Lewis, Dave (1994). Led Zeppelin: The Complete Guide to Their Music. London: Omnibus Press. ISBN 0-7119-3528-9.
- Lomax, John A.; Lomax, Alan (2013). American Ballads and Folk Songs. Courier Corporation. ISBN 978-0486319926.
- Odum, Howard Washington; Johnson, Guy Benton (1926). Negro workaday songs. Chapel Hill : The University of North Carolina Press.
- Popoff, Martin (2018). Led Zeppelin: All the Albums, All the Songs, Expanded Edition. Quarto Publishing. ISBN 978-0-760-36376-8.
- Shadwick, Keith (2005). Led Zeppelin: The Story of a Band and Their Music 1968–1980 (1st ed.). San Francisco: Backbeat Books. ISBN 0-87930-871-0.
