= God Moves on the Water =

Single by Blind Willie Johnson
- Released: 1929–30
- Recorded: New Orleans, Louisiana, December 11, 1929
- Genre: Blues
- Length: 3:04
- Label: Columbia (14520-D)
- Songwriter: Unknown

"God Moves on the Water" is a gospel blues song recorded by Blind Willie Johnson in 1929 and released on a 78 rpm record by Columbia Records.

The song describes the sinking of RMS Titanic and the consequent loss of life after it struck an iceberg on April 14, 1912. Its origins are obscure: topical songs are generally written soon after the event to which they relate. Johnson's lyrics call the ship's captain, E. J. Smith, A. G. Smith, which suggests an oral tradition. The fact that two of the earliest recordings, by Johnson in 1929 and by Mance Lipscomb in 1965, were made by Texans suggests an origin in that state.

The title may allude to the Book of Genesis at 1:2: "And the Spirit of God moved upon the face of the waters". If it does, the song may derive from an earlier gospel song, now lost.

== Recordings ==
The following recordings are by notable musicians:

- 1929 – Blind Willie Johnson
- 1963–71 – Rory Block and Stefan Grossman, as an instrumental
- 1965 – Mance Lipscomb, live at the 1965 Newport Folk Festival
- 1966 – Mance Lipscomb, live at the 1966 Berkeley Folk Music Festival
- 1972 – Stefan Grossman, as an instrumental
- 2000 – Guy Forsyth
- 2003 – Chris Jones and Steve Baker, on the album Smoke and Noise
- 2003 – Chris Jones, on the album Roadhouses and Automobiles
- 2004 – Mary Margaret O'Hara
- 2008 – Garrison Keillor, on the album A Prairie Home Companion 4th Annual Farewell Performance
- 2009 – Charlie Parr, on the album Roustabout
- 2011 – Charlie Parr, on the album Keep your Hands on the Plow
- 2011 – "God Moves on Water" by Dead Rock West, on the album Bright Morning Stars
- 2020 – Larkin Poe, on the album Self-Made Man
