= The Soul of a Man =

Soul of a Man
- DVD cover
- Directed by: Wim Wenders
- Written by: Wim Wenders
- Produced by: Martin Scorsese
- Cinematography: Lisa Rinzler
- Edited by: Mathilde Bonnefoy
- Music by: Skip James; Blind Willie Johnson; J. B. Lenoir
- Distributed by: PBS
- Release date: 2003
- Countries: United States; Germany
- Language: English

The Soul of a Man is a 2003 documentary film, directed by Wim Wenders, as the second instalment of the documentary film series The Blues, produced by Martin Scorsese. The film explores the musical careers of blues musicians Skip James, Blind Willie Johnson and J. B. Lenoir.

== Overview ==
The film is narrated by Laurence Fishburne in character as Blind Willie Johnson, and features performances by Nick Cave and the Bad Seeds, Beck, Jon Spencer Blues Explosion, James 'Blood' Ulmer, T-Bone Burnett, Eagle Eye Cherry, Shemekia Copeland, Garland Jeffreys, Alvin Youngblood Hart, Los Lobos, Bonnie Raitt, Lou Reed, Marc Ribot, Lucinda Williams, and Cassandra Wilson.

== Accolades ==
The film won an Emmy Award for Outstanding Cinematography for Nonfiction Programming, and the Audience Award at the São Paulo International Film Festival. It was also screened out of competition at the 2003 Cannes Film Festival.
