= Dorothy Love Coates =

American gospel singer (1928–2003)

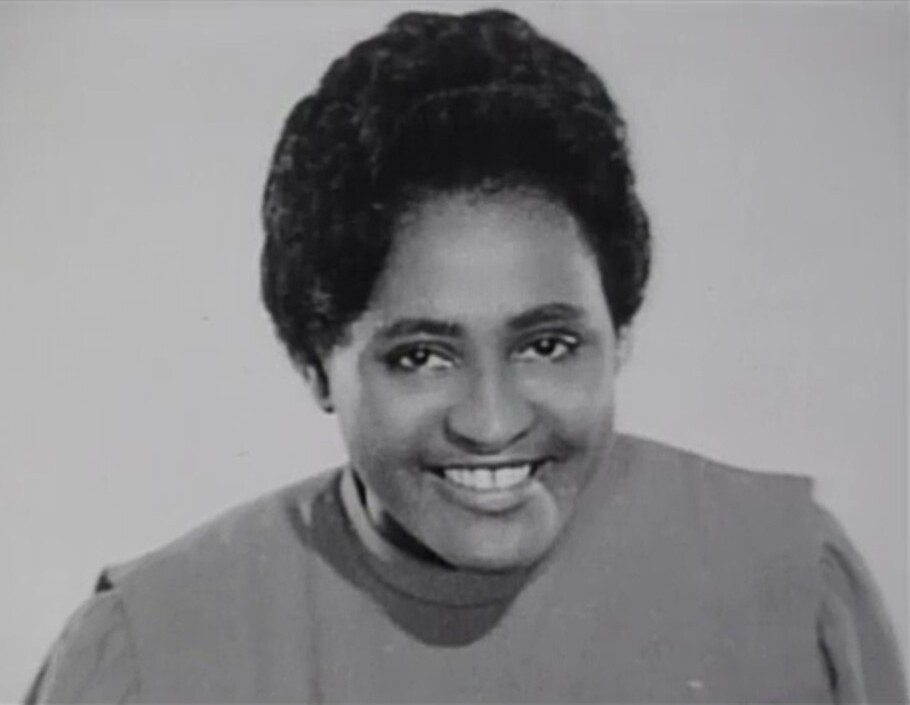

Background information
- Born: Dorothy McGriff; January 30, 1928; Birmingham, Alabama, U.S.
- Died: April 9, 2002 (aged 74) Birmingham, Alabama, U.S.
- Genres: Gospel
- Occupations: Singer and civil rights activist
- Years active: 1949–1970
- Labels: Specialty, Savoy, Vee-Jay, Columbia, Nashboro
- Spouse(s): Willie Love (m. 1944), Carl Coates (m. 1959)

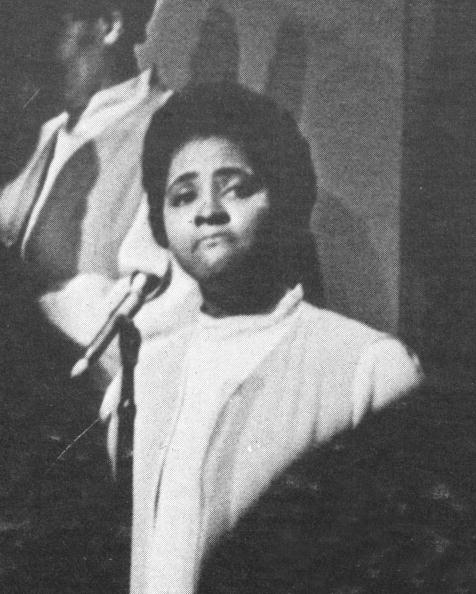

Dorothy Love Coates (née McGriff; January 30, 1928 – April 9, 2002) was an American gospel singer, composer and songwriter, and a civil rights activist.

== Family ==
Dorothy McGriff was born on January 30, 1928, in Birmingham, Alabama, as one of seven children. Her early years were hard (she later described them as "the same old thing"). Her father, Lillar McGriff, a minister, left the family when she was six, divorcing her mother thereafter. Dorothy began playing piano in the Baptist Church at age ten, then joined her sisters and brother in the McGriff Singers, who had a weekly live radio broadcast slot on WJLD radio station.

Dorothy quit high school after 10th grade to work "all the standard Negro jobs" available in Birmingham in the 1940s: scrubbing floors and working behind the counter in laundries and dry cleaners. She began singing with the Gospel Harmonettes, then known as the Gospel Harmoneers, in the early 1940s. She said of this time: "on weekdays I worked for the white man. On weekends I sang for the people."

On September 9, 1944, she married Willie Love of The Fairfield Four, one of the most popular quartets of the early years of gospel, but divorced him shortly thereafter. On September 24, 1959, she married Carl Coates, bassist and guitarist of the Sensational Nightingales. This marriage lasted until his death in 1999.

== Musical success ==
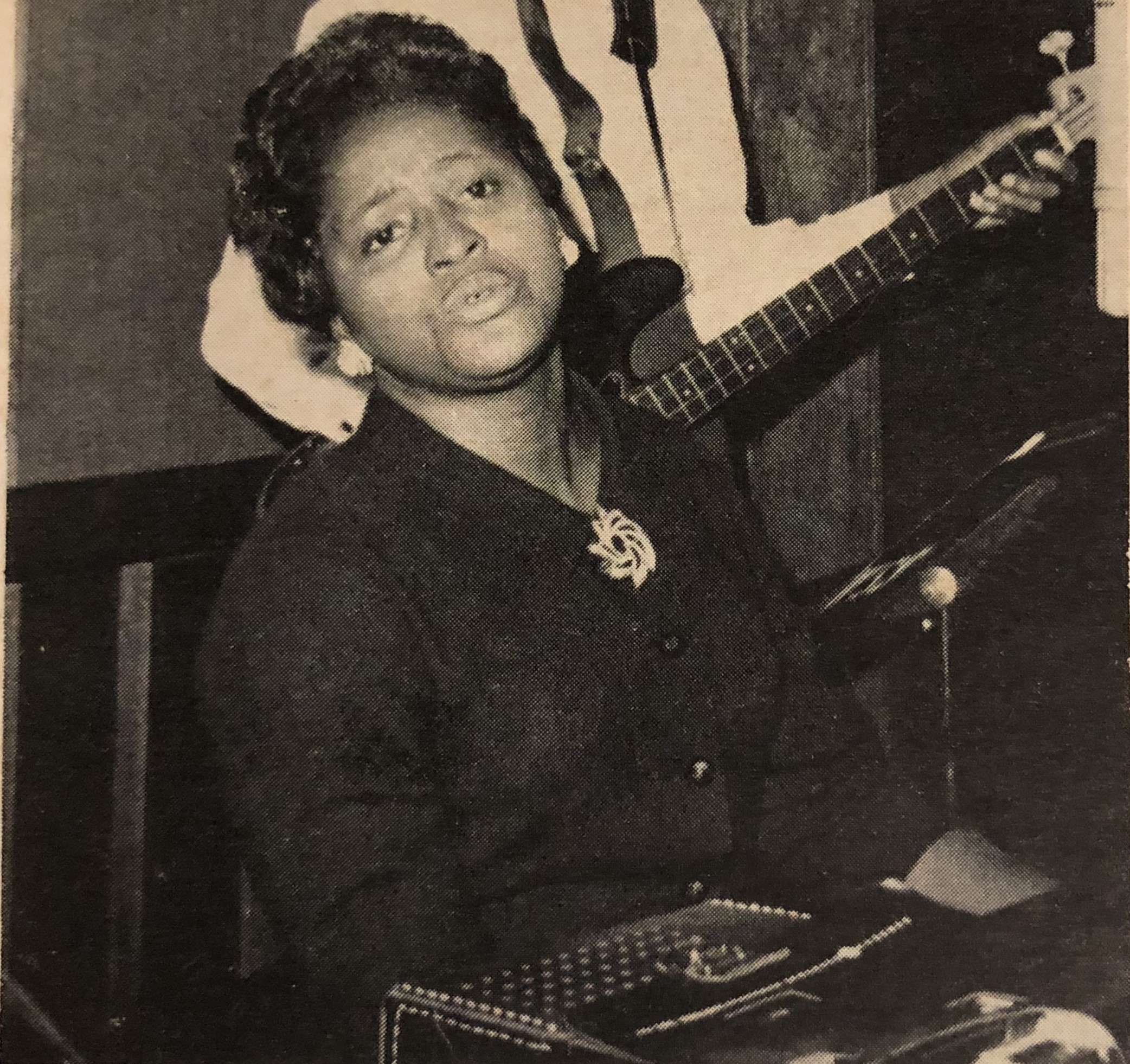
Coates in a recording session

Coates rose to stardom in the 1950s as a member of The Original Gospel Harmonettes. With her "raggedy", "raspy" and "rough" voice and preacher's fire, Coates could outsing the most powerful, hard male gospel singers of the era. She helped the group become a powerhouse. Coates was also a notable composer, writing songs such as "You Can't Hurry God (He's Right On Time)", "99 and a Half Won't Do", and "That's Enough".

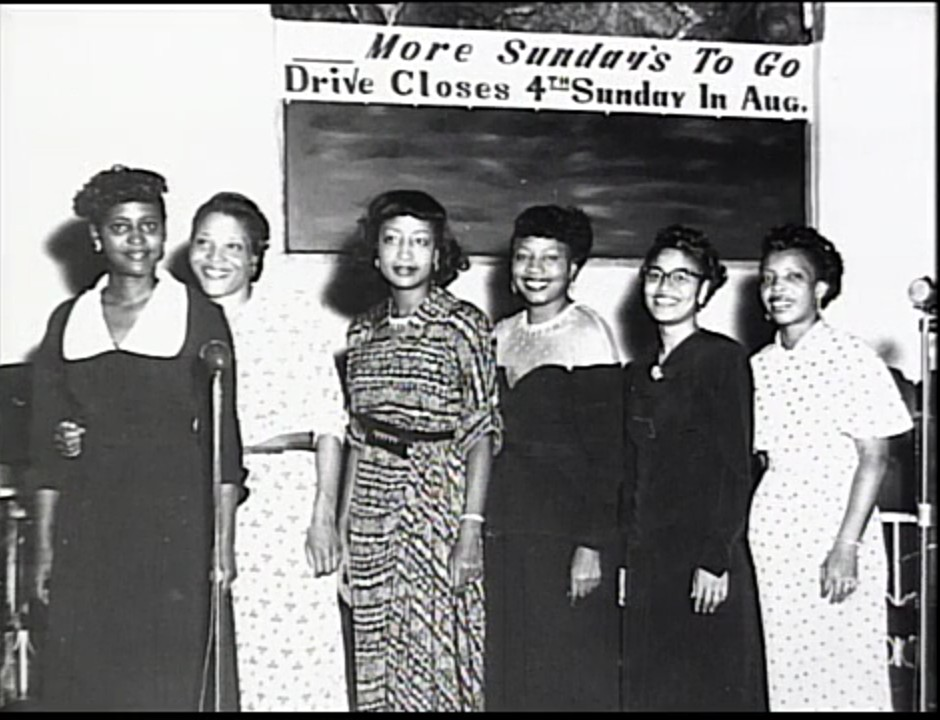
The Original Gospel Harmonettes

The Gospel Harmonettes — later renamed the Original Gospel Harmonettes — had achieved some fame in an early appearance when the National Baptist Convention came to Birmingham in 1940. Led by Evelyn Starks, a pianist whose style of playing was much imitated, its lead singer was Mildred Madison Miller, a mezzo-soprano who had a down-home sound that came to be a symbol of the group. The group included Odessa Edwards, Vera Conner Kolb, and Willie Mae Newberry Garth. The group had a regular half-hour radio show sponsored by A.G. Gaston, a local businessman and community leader.

The group first recorded for RCA in 1949, but without Love, after appearing on Arthur Godfrey's Talent Scouts television program. Those recordings, while not particularly memorable, are considered a rare jewel nowadays and include the songs "In the Upper Room" and "Move on Up a little Higher".

Their first sides for Specialty Records—"I'm Sealed" and "Get Away Jordan"—recorded with Love in 1951 were far more successful. The group recorded a series of hits in the years that followed before disbanding in 1958.

Dorothy was the driving force behind the group's success, both on record and in person, singing with such spirit that the other members of the group would occasionally have to lead her back to the stage—a device that James Brown copied and made part of his act in the 1960s, but which was wholly genuine in Love's case. She also took over the role, particularly after Odessa Edwards' retirement, of preacher/narrator, directing pointed criticisms from the stage of the evils she saw in the church and in the world at large.

== Civil rights activism ==
During the years of her retirement from music, from 1959 to 1961, (then) Dorothy Love became active in the civil rights movement, working with Martin Luther King Jr. She worked at voter registration drives, was present at the so-called Newark Riots in 1967, and was arrested and imprisoned for a time in Birmingham Jail for her campaigning. She regarded jail as an honour, and as she was fond of telling church audiences, "The Lord has blessed our going out and our coming in. He's blessed our sitting in, too."

While many other gospel artists were slow to address political issues head-on, Coates spoke out against the Vietnam War, racism and other evils. She was just as plainspoken when criticizing the exploitative treatment that she and other gospel singers received from gospel promoters, both White and Black.

== Return to music ==
She re-formed the Harmonettes in 1961, and when that group disbanded later in the decade, she continued touring with a group known as the Dorothy Love Coates Singers, featuring her sister Lillian McGriff. In her song "The Hymn," released in 1964, she sang: "When the president was assassinated, the nation said, 'Where is God?' When the little children lost their lives in the church bombing, the nation cried, 'Where is God?' I got the answer for you today: God is still on the throne."

Coates recorded, both individually and with her group, on Savoy Records, Vee-Jay Records and Columbia Records in the 1960s and made occasional appearances, but no recordings, after 1980. She appeared in the films The Long Walk Home and Beloved, leading a chorus of formerly enslaved singers, at the end of her career.

== Death ==
Coates died in a hospital in her native Birmingham, Alabama on April 9, 2002, of heart disease, at the age of 74.

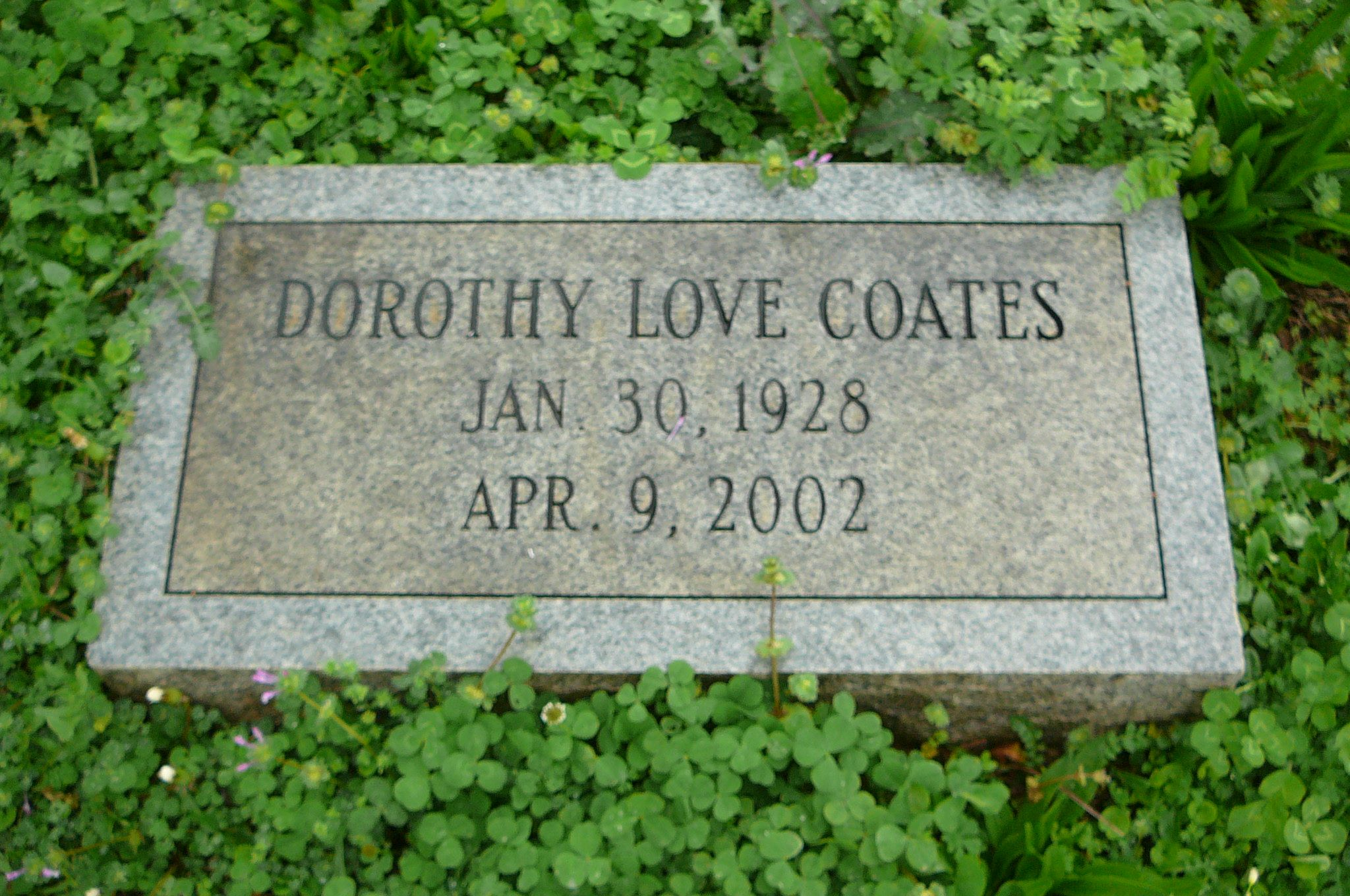

== Legacy ==
While Coates vigorously rejected all offers to cross over to pop or soul music, a number of artists, including Little Richard, imitated her sanctified singing style. Other secular songwriters drew on her songs for inspiration, sometimes simply taking the title, as in the case of Wilson Pickett's wholly different soul tune "99 and a Half Won't Do", and sometimes adapting both lyrics and title, as in the case of the Supremes's hit "You Can't Hurry Love". The Jerry Garcia Band recorded her "I'll Be with Thee" on Cats Under the Stars, and performed "Strange Man" in concert. Singer Mavis Staples has stated that Dorothy Love Coates was an influence on her vocal style.
