= Samson and Delilah (traditional song) =

Traditional song about Samson and Delilah

"Samson and Delilah" is a traditional song based on the Biblical tale of Samson and his betrayal by Delilah. Its best known performer is perhaps the Grateful Dead, who first performed the song live in 1976, with guitarist Bob Weir singing lead vocals. The 1977 album Terrapin Station featured a studio recording of the song.

Although Weir learned the song from Reverend Gary Davis, several earlier versions had been recorded under various titles, including "If I Had My Way I'd Tear the Building Down"/"Oh Lord If I Had My Way" by Blind Willie Johnson in 1927. The song has since been performed by a wide variety of artists ranging from Dave van Ronk, Bob Dylan, Charlie Parr, The Staple Singers, Ike and Tina Turner, Clara Ward, Dorothy Love Coates & The Gospel Harmonettes, to Peter, Paul and Mary, The Washington Squares, The Blasters, Willie Watson, Elizabeth Cook, Robert Randolph and the Family Band, and Bruce Springsteen and the Seeger Sessions Band (in Verona, Italy 2006). Garbage frontwoman Shirley Manson's version appeared in the second season premiere episode (also titled "Samson and Delilah") of the Fox television show Terminator: The Sarah Connor Chronicles, in which Manson was also a main cast member. Art Greenhaw recorded a version with The Jordanaires and Larry "T-Byrd" Gordon, which was released in 2005.

Guest star Simon Oakland sings the song with the drovers around a campfire in the Rawhide episode "Incident of the Travellin' Man", aired in season six on October 17, 1963.

The song also appeared on the Tom Jones album Surrounded by Time in 2021.
