= Keep Your Lamp Trimmed and Burning =

Traditional gospel blues song

"Keep Your Lamp(s) Trimmed and Burning" is a traditional gospel blues song. It alludes to the Parable of the Wise and Foolish Virgins, found in the Gospel of Matthew at 25:1-13, and also to a verse in the Gospel of Luke, at 12:35.

The song has been attributed to Blind Willie Johnson, who recorded it in 1928; to Reverend Gary Davis, who recorded it in 1956; and to Mississippi Fred McDowell, who recorded it in 1959.

The song has been included in several hymnals.

== Lyrics ==
The song is in call-and-response format. As is common with traditional songs, lyrics vary between performers – in this instance, often very widely. A usual first verse is:

Keep your lamp(s) trimmed and burning,
The world (or "work") is nearly done (or "The time is drawing nigh")

"The world" and "the time" relate to the apocalyptic prophecies of the New Testament. "The work" can do so also, but suggests that the song may derive from an African-American work song.

== Recordings ==
"Keep Your Lamp Trimmed and Burning" (Blind Willie Johnson version)
Blind Willie Johnson's 1928 recording of the song

Recordings by notable artists include:

- 1928 – Blind Willie Johnson
- 1956 – Reverend Gary Davis
- 1959 – Mississippi Fred McDowell
- 1967 – Skip James
- 1970 – Hot Tuna, on the album Hot Tuna
- 1970 – Wizz Jones, on the album The Legendary Me
- 1971 – Hot Tuna, on the album First Pull Up, Then Pull Down
- 1975 – Pearly Brown, on the album It's a Mean Old World to Try to Live In
- 1975 – John Fahey and his Orchestra, on the album Old Fashioned Love
- 1978 – Hot Tuna, on the album Double Dose
- 1984 – Hot Tuna, on the album Splashdown
- 1986 – Hot Rize, on the album Traditional Ties
- 1990 – Kaiser/Mansfield, on the 1990 album Trimmed & Burnin'
- 1993 – Wizz Jones, on the album Late Nights and Long Days
- 1995 – Corey Harris, on the album Between Midnight and Day
- 1996 – Hot Rize, on the 2002 album So Long of a Journey: Live at the Bouder Theater
- 2001 – The Word, on the album The Word
- 2002 – Andrew Bird, on the album Fingerlings
- 2008 – The 77s, on the album Holy Ghost Building
- 2008 – Catfish Keith, on the album Live at the Half Moon
- 2011 – Catfish Keith, on the album A True Friend is Hard To Hard: A Gospel Retrospective
- 2013 – Luke Winslow-King on the album The Coming Tide
- 2013 – Marisa Anderson on the album Traditional and Public Domain Songs
- 2015 – Larry Campbell and Teresa Williams, on the album Larry Campbell and Teresa Williams
- 2016 – Hugh and Katy Moffatt, on the album Now and Then
- 2016 – Derek Trucks and Susan Tedeschi, on the album God Don't Never Change: The Songs Of Blind Willie Johnson
- 2016 – Red Molly, on the album Love and Other Tragedies
- 2023 – Nefesh Mountain

== See also ==
- "The Man Comes Around", a song based on the same biblical passages
