= Dark Was the Night, Cold Was the Ground =

Instrumental by Blind Willie Johnson

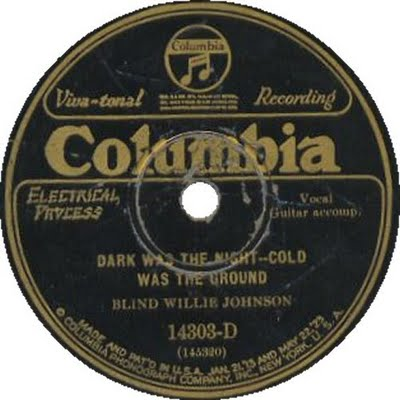

Single by Blind Willie Johnson
- Released: April 20, 1928
- Recorded: December 3, 1927
- Genre: Gospel blues
- Length: 3:21
- Label: Columbia
- Songwriter: Blind Willie Johnson

"Dark Was the Night, Cold Was the Ground" (Note: Because documentation is scarce in early recordings, the title of the song appears differently in many sources. It is often called "Dark Was the Night" or punctuated as "Dark Was the Night (Cold Was the Ground)" or "Dark Was the Night—Cold Was the Ground".) is a gospel blues song written and performed by American musician Blind Willie Johnson and recorded in 1927. The song is primarily an instrumental featuring Johnson's self-taught bottleneck slide guitar and picking style accompanied by his vocalizations of humming and moaning. It has the distinction of being one of 27 samples of music included on the Voyager Golden Record, launched into space in 1977 to represent the diversity of life on Earth. The song has been highly praised and covered by numerous musicians and is featured on the soundtracks of several films.

== Background ==
Born in 1897, Johnson taught himself how to play guitar and dedicated his life to blues and gospel music, playing for people on street corners and in mission halls. Columbia Records had a field unit that traveled to smaller towns to record local talent. Johnson recorded 30 songs for them at five sessions between 1927 and 1930. Among the first of these was "Dark Was the Night, Cold Was the Ground."

== Composition and recording ==
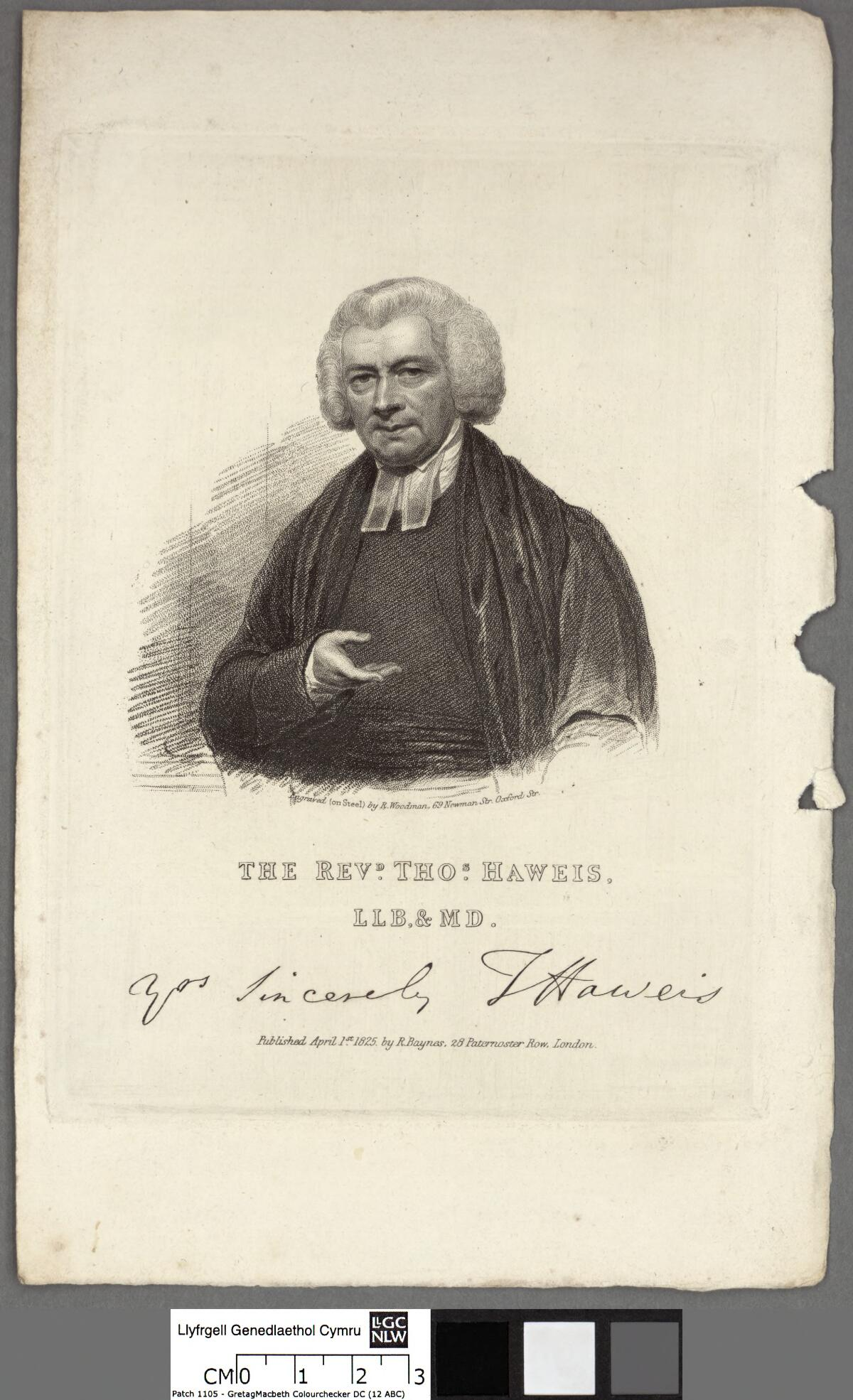
The original hymn “Gethsemane” was written by English clergyman Thomas Haweis in 1792.

The song's title is borrowed from a hymn that was popular in the 19th century American South with fasola singers. "Gethsemane", written by English clergyman Thomas Haweis in 1792, begins with the lines "Dark was the night, and cold the ground / Where Jesus prostrate laid." Music historian Mark Humphrey describes Johnson's composition as an impressionistic rendition of "lining out", a call-and-response style of singing hymns that is common in southern African American churches.

"Dark Was the Night, Cold Was the Ground" is three minutes and 21 seconds of Johnson's unique guitar playing in open D tuning for slide. By most accounts, Johnson substituted a knife or penknife for the bottleneck. His melancholy, gravel-throated humming of the guitar part creates the impression of "unison moaning", a melodic style common in Baptist churches where, instead of harmonizing, a choir hums or sings the same vocal part, albeit with slight variations among its members. Although Johnson's vocals are indiscernible, several sources indicate the subject of the song is the crucifixion of Christ.

His records were sold by the Columbia and Vocalion labels with other blues acts like Bessie Smith, whom Johnson outsold during the Depression years. In 1928, the influential blues critic Edward Abbe Niles championed Johnson in his column for The Bookman, praising his "violent, tortured, and abysmal shouts and groans, and his inspired guitar playing."

== Legacy ==
=== Music ===
Johnson's music experienced a revival in the 1960s thanks in large part to the efforts of blues guitarist Reverend Gary Davis. A highly regarded figure within the burgeoning New York folk scene, Davis gave copies of Johnson's records to young musicians and taught them to play his songs. The Soul Stirrers, Staple Singers, Buffy Sainte-Marie and Peter, Paul & Mary all covered Johnson. In 1969, the English folk-rock band Fairport Convention released the album What We Did on Our Holidays which included a song inspired by "Dark Was the Night, Cold Was the Ground" called "The Lord Is in this Place...How Dreadful Is this Place". Ry Cooder recorded a guitar-only version of the song with a slightly modified title, “Dark Is The Night,” for his 1970 self-titled solo album. A compilation album titled Dark Was the Night was released in 2009 by the Red Hot Organization, a charity that raises awareness of HIV and AIDS issues through music. The Kronos Quartet recorded an arrangement of "Dark Was the Night, Cold Was the Ground" that appears on the album. The song "Excavating Rita" by Half Man Half Biscuit on their 2011 album 90 Bisodol (Crimond) quotes the song's title.

Singer-guitarist Jack White of The White Stripes called "Dark Was the Night, Cold Was the Ground" "the greatest example of slide guitar ever recorded" and used the song as a standard to measure such iconic rock music that followed in its wake, such as "Whole Lotta Love" by Led Zeppelin. In 2003, John Clarke in The Times wrote that "Dark Was the Night, Cold Was the Ground" was "the most intense and startling blues record ever made". Francis Davis, author of The History of the Blues concurs, writing "In terms of its intensity alone—its spiritual ache—there is nothing else from the period to compare to Johnson's 'Dark Was the Night, Cold Was the Ground', on which his guitar takes the part of a preacher and his wordless voice the part of a rapt congregation."

Johnson's recording of "Dark Was the Night, Cold Was the Ground" was selected by the Library of Congress as a 2010 addition to the National Recording Registry, which selects recordings annually that are "culturally, historically, or aesthetically significant". The Wire included the song in their 1998 list of "100 Records That Set the World on Fire (While No One Was Listening)". The staff wrote that Blind Willie "recorded nothing else like this and, therefore, it has no equal in recorded music, even though Ry Cooder has made a good living scoring movies following its lead." They further noted that the song could retrospectively be described as ambient music as it is "a piece of country gospel improvisation, slide guitar with vocal hums and moans, but no lyrics."

=== Usage in film and television ===
“Dark Was the Night, Cold Was the Ground” was used on the Oscar-nominated soundtrack to Pier Paolo Pasolini's film The Gospel According to St Matthew, in scenes where Judas Iscariot laments betraying Christ and a cripple asks to be healed. Ry Cooder based his track "Powis Square" from the soundtrack of Nicolas Roeg's 1970 film Performance and his title track to Wim Wenders' 1984 film Paris, Texas on "Dark Was the Night, Cold Was the Ground", which he has described as "the most soulful, transcendent piece in all American music." The television show The West Wing refers to the song and its impact to the Voyager Program in the Season 5, episode 13 "The Warfare of Genghis Khan" and plays the song at the end of the episode. Wim Wenders, the director of Paris, Texas, included Blind Willie Johnson's music and life in his 2003 documentary The Soul of a Man. The song was used in Martin Scorsese's 2023 film Killers of the Flower Moon.

=== Voyager Golden Record ===
In 1977, Carl Sagan and other researchers collected sounds and images from planet Earth to send on Voyager 1 and Voyager 2. The Voyager Golden Record includes recordings of frogs, crickets, volcanoes, a human heartbeat, laughter, greetings in 55 languages, and 27 pieces of music. "Dark Was the Night, Cold Was the Ground" was included, according to Timothy Ferris, because "Johnson's song concerns a situation he faced many times: nightfall with no place to sleep. Since humans appeared on Earth, the shroud of night has yet to fall without touching a man or woman in the same plight."

== Bibliography ==
- Bogdanov, Vladimir; Woodstra, Chris; Erlewine, Stephen (2003). All Music Guide to the Blues: The Definitive Guide to the Blues, Hal Leonard Corporation. ISBN 0-87930-736-6
- Humphrey, Mark (1993). "Holy Blues: The Gospel Tradition". in Cohn, Lawrence. Nothing but the Blues: The Music and the Musicians, Abbeville Press. ISBN 0-7892-0607-2
- Corcoran, Michael (2005). All Over the Map: True Heroes of Texas Music, University of Texas Press. ISBN 0-292-70976-5
- Dargan, William T. (2006). Lining Out the Word: Dr. Watts Hymn Singing in the Music of Black Americans, University of California Press. ISBN 0-520-23448-0
- Davis, Francis (2003). The History of the Blues: The Roots, the Music, the People, Da Capo Press. ISBN 0-306-81296-7
- Hill, Samuel; Lippy, Charles; Wilson, Charles (2005). Encyclopedia of Religion in the South, Mercer University Press. ISBN 0-86554-758-0
- Hurwitt, Elliot (2008). "Abbe Niles, Blues Advocate". in Evans, David. Ramblin' on My Mind: New Perspectives on the Blues, University of Illinois Press. ISBN 0-252-07448-3
