= Mother's Children Have a Hard Time =

Single by Blind Willie Johnson
- Recorded: Dallas, Texas, December 3, 1927
- Genre: Gospel blues
- Label: Columbia
- Songwriter: Blind Willie Johnson

"Mother's Children Have a Hard Time", also known as "Motherless Children", is a gospel blues song recorded by Blind Willie Johnson in 1927. It is a solo performance, with Johnson singing and playing an acoustic slide guitar.

== Background ==
Johnson recorded the song during his first session for the Columbia label in Dallas, Texas, on December 3, 1927. The lyrics are autobiographical, since Johnson's mother died when he was young. His father remarried soon after her death, and later, the stepmother allegedly threw a caustic solution, which blinded the boy: "Motherless children have a hard time, mother's dead, Well don't have anywhere to go, Wandering 'round from door to door".

Blues researcher Samuel Charters describes Johnson's slide guitar playing as having "a nuance and delicacy that extended and clarified the emotion of his singing", which is supported by his rhythmic fingerpicked bass line. Columbia issued the song on a 78 rpm record with the title "Mother's Children Have a Hard Time". Charters notes that this was based on a misinterpretation of Johnson's lyrics and the correct title is "Motherless Children Have a Hard Time".

== Covers ==
Following Johnson's original recording in 1927, the song has been covered by many artists, including Eric Clapton on his 1974 album 461 Ocean Boulevard under the title "Motherless Children".

== Bibliography ==
- Charters, Samuel (1993). The Complete Blind Willie Johnson (CD booklet). Blind Willie Johnson. New York City: Columbia Records/Legacy Recordings. C2K 52835.
- Evans, David (2008). Ramblin' on My Mind: New Perspectives on the Blues. University of Illinois Press. ISBN 0-252-07448-3
- Sackheim, Eric (2003). The Blues Line: Blues Lyrics from Leadbelly to Muddy Waters. Da Capo Press. ISBN 1-56025-567-6
