= Blind Willie Johnson =

American gospel blues musician (1897–1945)

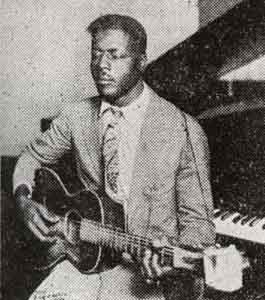
- The only known photograph of Johnson, 1927

Background information
- Also known as: Blind Willie; Blind Texas Marlin; The Blind Pilgrim
- Born: January 22, 1897 or January 25, 1897; Pendleton, Texas, or Independence, Texas U.S.
- Died: September 18, 1945 (aged 48) Beaumont, Texas, U.S.
- Genres: Gospel; gospel blues
- Occupations: Musician; preacher
- Instruments: Guitar; vocals
- Years active: 1920s–1945
- Label: Columbia
- Spouse(s): Willie B. Harris (unregistered); Angelina (Anna) Broussard (registered)

Willie Johnson (January 22 or January 25, 1897 – September 18, 1945), commonly known as Blind Willie Johnson, was an American gospel blues singer and guitarist. His landmark recordings completed between 1927 and 1930, thirty songs in all, display a combination of powerful chest voice singing, slide guitar skills and originality that has influenced generations of musicians. His records sold well though as a street performer and preacher, he had little wealth in his lifetime. His life was poorly documented, but over time, music historians such as Samuel Charters have uncovered more about him and his five recording sessions.

A revival of interest in Johnson's music began in the 1960s following his inclusion on Harry Smith's Anthology of American Folk Music and by the efforts of the blues guitarist Reverend Gary Davis. Along with Davis, he has since been considered the dominant player of holy blues music which conveys religious themes in a blues style, often with a blues style of guitar accompaniment.

Johnson's work has become more accessible through compilation albums such as American Epic: The Best of Blind Willie Johnson and the Charters compilations. As a result, Johnson is credited as one of the most influential practitioners of the blues and his slide guitar playing, particularly on his hymn "Dark Was the Night, Cold Was the Ground", is highly acclaimed. This song was included in the golden phonograph records aboard the Voyager interstellar probes launched in 1977 by NASA. Other recordings by Johnson include "Jesus Make Up My Dying Bed", "It's Nobody's Fault but Mine" and "John the Revelator".

== Biography ==
=== Early life and career ===
Willie Johnson was born on either January 22, 1897 or January 25, 1897, in Independence, Texas or Pendleton, Texas, a small town near Temple, Texas, to sharecropper Dock Johnson and Mary King, who died when Johnson was 4. His family, which according to the blues historian Stephen Calt included at least one younger brother (named Carl), moved to the agriculturally rich community of Marlin, where Johnson spent most of his childhood. There, the Johnson family attended church, most likely the Marlin Missionary Baptist Church, every Sunday, a habit that had a lasting impact on Johnson and fueled his desire to be ordained as a Baptist minister. When Johnson was five years old, his father gave him his first instrument, a cigar box guitar.

Johnson was not born blind, though he was visually impaired at an early age. It is uncertain how he lost his sight but it is generally agreed by most of his biographers that he was blinded by his stepmother when he was seven years old, a claim that was first made by Johnson's widow, Angeline Johnson. In her recollection, Willie's father had violently confronted Willie's stepmother about her infidelity and, during the argument, she splashed Willie with a caustic solution of lye water, permanently blinding him.

Few other details are known about his childhood. At some point, he met another blind musician, Madkin Butler, who had a powerful singing and preaching style that influenced Johnson's own vocal delivery and repertoire. Adam Booker, a blind minister interviewed by the blues historian Samuel Charters in the 1950s, recalled that while visiting his father in Hearne, Johnson would perform religious songs on street corners and had a tin cup tied to the neck of his Stella guitar to collect money. Occasionally, Johnson would play on the same street as Blind Lemon Jefferson in Dallas' Deep Ellum district, but the extent of the two songsters' involvement with each other is unknown.

=== Personal life ===
In 1926 or early 1927, Johnson began an unregistered marriage with Willie B. Harris who occasionally sang on the street with him and accompanied him on piano at benefits for the Marlin Church of God in Christ. They had a daughter, Sam Faye Johnson Kelly, in 1931.

Angelina Broussard of Lafayette, Louisiana, (often erroneously listed as Angelina Robinson; and listed on Johnson's death certificate as Anna), claimed to have married Johnson in 1922, although September 15 1941 has been found to be correct.

=== Recording sessions (1927–1930) ===
By the time Johnson began his recording career, he was a well-known evangelist with a "remarkable technique and a wide range of songs" as blues historian Paul Oliver notes. On December 3, 1927, Johnson along with Billiken Johnson and Coley Jones got together at a temporary studio that talent scout Frank Buckley Walker had set up in the Deep Ellum neighborhood in Dallas to record them for Columbia Records. In the session, Johnson played six songs, 13 takes total. Among the songs he recorded in that day were "Jesus Make Up My Dying Bed", "It's Nobody's Fault but Mine", "Mother's Children Have a Hard Time", "Dark Was the Night, Cold Was the Ground", and "If I Had My Way I'd Tear the Building Down". He was compensated with $50 per usable side, a substantial amount for the period, plus a bonus for forfeiting royalties from the sales of his records.

The first releases were "I Know His Blood Can Make Me Whole" and "Jesus Make Up My Dying Bed", on Columbia's popular 14000 Race series. His debut was a substantial success as 9,400 copies were pressed, more than the latest release by one of Columbia's most established stars, Bessie Smith. An additional pressing of 6,000 copies followed. His fifth recorded song, "Dark Was the Night, Cold Was the Ground", the B-side of Johnson's second release, best exemplifies his slide guitar playing in open D tuning. For the session, Johnson substituted a knife or penknife for the bottleneck and, according to Harris, he played with a thumb pick. His melancholy humming of the guitar part creates the impression of unison moaning, a style of singing hymns that is common in southern African-American church groups. In 1928, the blues critic Edward Abbe Niles praised Johnson in his column for The Bookman, emphasizing his "violent, tortured, and abysmal shouts and groans, and his inspired guitar playing".

Johnson and Harris returned to Dallas on December 5, 1928 to record "I'm Gonna Run to the City of Refuge", "Jesus Is Coming Soon", "Lord I Just Can't Keep From Crying" and "Keep Your Lamp Trimmed and Burning". He also recorded two unreleased and untitled tracks under the pseudonym Blind Texas Marlin but those recordings were never recovered. Another year passed before Johnson recorded again, on December 10 and 11, 1929, the longest sessions of his career. He completed ten sides in 16 takes at Werlein's Music Store in New Orleans. He also recorded some duets with an unknown female singer who is thought to have been a member of Reverend J. M. Gates's congregation.

The blind street performer Dave Ross reported hearing Johnson performing on the street in New Orleans in December 1929. Jazz historian Richard Allen recalls hearing a story that Johnson was arrested while performing in front of the Custom House on Canal Street for allegedly attempting to incite a riot with his impassioned rendition of "If I Had My Way I'd Tear the Building Down".

For his fifth and final recording session, Johnson journeyed to Atlanta, Georgia along with Harris who added vocal harmonies. They completed ten selections on April 20, 1930. Columbia chose "Everybody Ought to Treat a Stranger Right" paired with "Go with Me to That Land" as the first record released from the session. However, the Great Depression had impoverished much of Johnson's audience and consequently only 800 copies were pressed.

Some of his songs were re-released by Vocalion Records in 1932 but Johnson never recorded again.

=== Later life and death ===
Throughout the Great Depression and the 1940s, he performed in several cities and towns in Texas, including Beaumont. A city directory shows that in 1945, a Reverend W. J. Johnson, undoubtedly Blind Willie, operated the House of Prayer at 1440 Forrest Street there. In 1945, a fire destroyed their home and, with nowhere else to go, Johnson continued to live in its ruins where he was soaked and cold. Standing out in the winter winds the next day, singing to earn a little money, Johnson got sick and within a few days was dying of pneumonia. He contracted malarial fever and no hospital would admit him either because of his visual impairment or, as Angeline Johnson stated in an interview with Charters, because he was black. Over the course of the year, his condition steadily worsened until he died, on September 18, 1945. His death certificate reported syphilis and blindness as contributing factors. A 1947 Beaumont directory listed Anna Johnson as his widow.

According to his death certificate, Johnson was buried in Blanchette Cemetery, in Beaumont, Texas. Over time, various African-American cemeteries from the segregated era became abandoned and neglected. As a result, some confusion arose as to where "Blanchette Cemetery" was located. In 2007, a pair of blues researchers set out to find Johnson's grave. They eventually collected evidence that Blanchette Cemetery is "situated between Hegele and Ollie Streets cornered by Inca Street and Southern Pacific Road in Beaumont, Texas". This area is part of a complex of four graveyards now known as Pear Orchard Cemetery. No headstone was found yielding Johnson's name, and the exact location of his grave remains unknown. In 2010, at the request of the two researchers, a cenotaph for Johnson was placed on the Blanchette Cemetery plot of land.

In December 2010, a historical marker was placed in Johnson's honor near the Pilgrim Rest Missionary Baptist Church in Beaumont, Texas.

== Musical style ==
"Keep Your Lamp Trimmed and Burning"
Traditional blues song recorded in 1928 by Johnson and his first wife

Johnson is considered one of the masters of blues singing and guitar playing particularly in the gospel blues style. Like his contemporary Blind Lemon Jefferson, he channeled the expressiveness of the blues into his religious messages which he took from hymnbooks. Samuel Charters, in the liner notes to the compilation album The Complete Blind Willie Johnson, wrote that, in fact, Johnson was not a bluesman in the traditional sense, "but here still is so much similarity between his relentless guitar rhythms and his harsh, insistent voice, and the same fierce intensities of the blues singers, that they become images of each other, seen in the mirror of the society that produced them".

An important aspect of Johnson's recordings was his mastery of bottleneck, slide guitar technique which was influential on Robert Johnson and Howlin' Wolf. He punctuated his playing with tonal control and a sense of timing, often using the guitar to sing harmony and to fill in lines, as on "Dark Was the Night, Cold Was the Ground". By most accounts, including one by the reputable blues guitarist Blind Willie McTell, Johnson used a knife as a slide but other claims by Harris and the bluesman Thom Shaw say he used a thumb pick or brass ring on his recordings. The music historian Steve Calt said of Johnson's style, "opposed to other bottleneck artists he varies the speed of his vibrato drastically, often speeding up as he slides into a note. He is also one of the few bottleneck artists with the ability to consistently sound three or four discreet melody notes upon striking a string once, a skill that reflects uncanny left-handed strength, accuracy and agility".

Johnson sang in a gravelly, falsetto bass voice that was powerful enough for passersby on the streets to hear. His vocal interplay with his guitar was described by the blues writer Mark Makin as "fierce" and "not unlike the 'Hell and Damnation' of a Baptist preacher such as a fired-up Reverend A. W. Nix". On some instances in his recordings, Johnson also sang in his natural tenor voice. The only known influence on Johnson's singing style is the blind musician Madkin Butler, who, like Johnson, sang his religious message on the streets of Texas cities.

== Legacy ==
Johnson's music was revived in the 1960s thanks in large part to Harry Smith including his version of "John The Revelator" in the second volume of his Anthology of American Folk Music, Social Music, along with the three Sam Charters blues collections for Folkways Records, The Country Blues, Rural Blues and Blind Willie Johnson: His Story and blues guitarist Reverend Gary Davis, a highly regarded figure in New York's folk scene, recording his "Samson and Delilah" which the Soul Stirrers, the Staples Singers, Buffy Sainte-Marie, Fairport Convention, and Peter, Paul and Mary covered or re-interpreted. In November 1961, Bob Dylan recorded a rendition of "Jesus Make Up My Dying Bed", retitled "In My Time of Dying" for his self-titled debut album. Rock bands and artists of the 1970s also covered Johnson's songs including Led Zeppelin, John Sebastian, and Eric Clapton. In 2016, Alligator Records released the tribute album God Don't Never Change: The Songs of Blind Willie Johnson produced by Jeffrey Gaskill with covers by various artists including Tom Waits, Lucinda Williams, Sinead O'Connor and Derek Trucks and Susan Tedeschi. The album was nominated for two Grammy Awards: Best Roots Gospel Album and Best American Roots Performance for Blind Boys of Alabama recording of "Mother's Children Have a Hard Time".

All of Johnson's released material has become easily available thanks to compilation albums such as Blind Willie Johnson 1927–1930 and The Complete Blind Willie Johnson, among others. Samuel Charters was the first major blues historian to attempt to uncover more about Johnson's life, first documenting him in his 1959 book The Country Blues. In 1993, Charters corrected some factual inaccuracies in Johnson's biography in the liner notes to The Complete Blind Willie Johnson. Other books related to Johnson include Shine a Light: My Year with Blind Willie Johnson and Revelation The Blind Willie Johnson Biography.

In 1977, Carl Sagan and a team of researchers were tasked with collecting a representation of the human experience here on Earth and sending it into space on the Voyager probes for other life forms in the universe. Among the 27 songs selected for the Voyager Golden Record, NASA consultant Timothy Ferris chose "Dark Was the Night, Cold Was the Ground" because, according to Ferris, "Johnson's song concerns a situation he faced many times: nightfall with no place to sleep. Since humans first appeared on Earth, the shroud of night has yet to fall without touching a man or woman in the same plight". In 2010, the Library of Congress also selected the recording as an addition to the National Recording Registry which annually selects recordings that they deemed "culturally, historically, or aesthetically significant".

In 2017, the story of Blind Willie Johnson's inclusion on the Voyager probe was told in the multi-award-winning documentary series American Epic directed by Bernard MacMahon. A compilation album, American Epic: The Best of Blind Willie Johnson, accompanied the film and featured radically improved restorations of sixteen of Johnson's recordings. In 2020, the book titled "Dark Was the Night: Blind Willie Johnson's Journey to the Stars" written by Gary Golio and illustrated by E.B. Lewis was published by Nancy Paulsen Books, an imprint of Penguin Random House.

== See also ==
- List of songs recorded by Blind Willie Johnson
