= Gospel blues =

Form of blues-based gospel music

- Stylistic origins: Spirituals; blues; hymns
- Cultural origins: Late 19th century, African Americans

Gospel blues (or holy blues) is a form of blues-based gospel music that has been around since the inception of blues music. It combines evangelistic lyrics with blues instrumentation, often blues guitar accompaniment.

According to musician and historian Stefan Grossman, "holy blues" was coined to originally describe Reverend Gary Davis's style of traditional blues playing with lyrics conveying a religious message. Davis and Blind Willie Johnson are considered the genre's two dominant performers, according to Dick Weissman. Other notable gospel-blues performers include Sister Rosetta Tharpe and Washington Phillips.

Blues musicians who became devout, or even practicing clergy, include Reverend Robert Wilkins and Ishman Bracey. Bluesmen such as Blind Willie Johnson, Blind Lemon Jefferson, Charley Patton, Son House, Bukka White, and Skip James also recorded gospel blues or religious songs. Blind Lemon Jefferson and Charley Patton released gospel songs under a pseudonym.

== See also ==
- List of gospel blues musicians
- Southern soul
- Soul blues
- Boyd Rivers
