= Warm, in Your Coat =

Compilation album by Romeo Void
- Released: May 2, 1992
- Recorded: 1980–1984
- Genre: Rock
- Length: 65:05
- Label: Columbia
- Producer: David Kahne, Ric Ocasek, Ian Taylor, Romeo Void

Romeo Void chronology
Instincts (1984)	Warm, in Your Coat (1992)

Professional ratings
Review scores
Source	Rating
Allmusic	4.5/5 stars

Warm, in Your Coat is a Romeo Void compilation album released in 1992.

== Track listing ==
1. "White Sweater" (Debora Iyall, Peter Woods, Frank Zincavage) – 4:48
2. "I Mean It" (Benjamin Bossi, Iyall, Woods, Zincavage) – 5:40
3. "Charred Remains" (Iyall, Woods, Zincavage) – 3:04
4. "Talk Dirty to Me (Iyall, Woods, Zincavage) – 4:47
5. "Myself to Myself" (Iyall, Woods, Zincavage) – 3:44
6. "In the Dark" (Bossi, Larry Carter, Iyall, Woods, Zincavage) – 4:27
7. "A Girl in Trouble (Is a Temporary Thing)" (Iyall, Woods, Zincavage, David Kahne) – 4:18
8. "Out on My Own" [dance mix] (Iyall, Kahne, Woods, Zincavage) – 5:12
9. "Just Too Easy" (Iyall, Woods, Zincavage, Kahne) – 3:12
10. "Wrap It Up" (Isaac Hayes, David Porter) – 3:25
11. "Flashflood" (Bossi, Carter, Iyall, Woods, Zincavage) – 4:57
12. "Undercover Kept" (Bossi, Carter, Iyall, Woods, Zincavage) – 6:08
13. "Chinatown" (Bossi, Carter, Iyall, Woods, Zincavage) – 3:16
14. "Never Say Never" (Bossi, Carter, Iyall, Woods, Zincavage) – 5:54
15. "One Thousand Shadows" [previously unreleased] (Bossi, Iyall, Woods, Zincavage) – 3:29

== Personnel ==
- Debora Iyall – vocals
- Peter Woods – guitar
- Benjamin Bossi – saxophone
- Frank Zincavage – bass
- John Haines – drums, percussion (tracks 1–5)
- Larry Carter – drums, percussion on (tracks 6 and 10–14)
- Aaron Smith – drums, percussion (tracks 7–9)
