= Not Safe =

Not Safe may refer to:

- Not Safe with Nikki Glaser, a television series on Comedy Central
- "Not Safe", song by Corrosion of Conformity from Eye for an Eye
- "Not Safe", song by Romeo Void from Benefactor (album) and Never Say Never (Romeo Void song) EP
