= Blăjeni =

- Commune
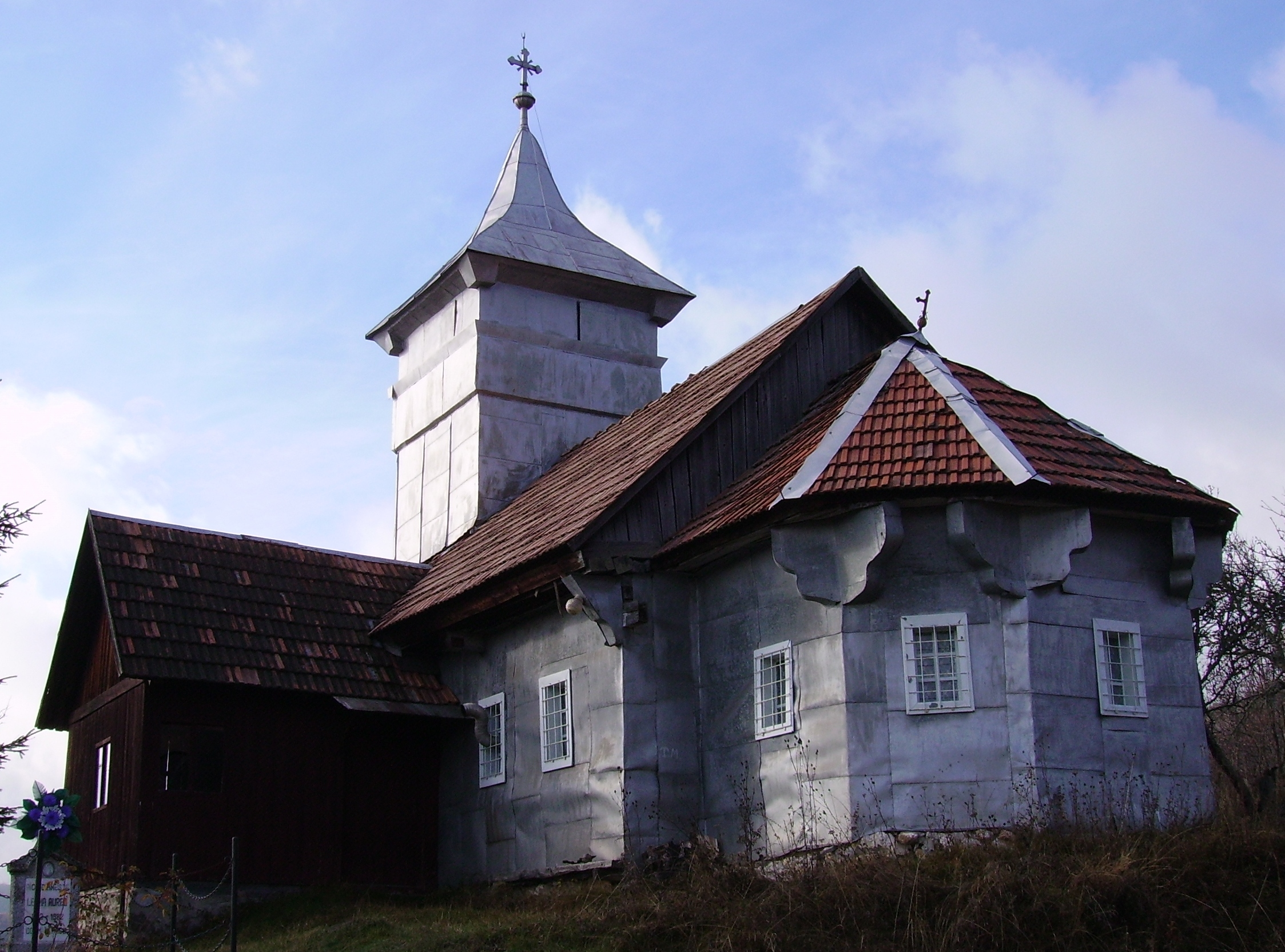
- Wooden church in Obârșa hamlet, Sălătruc village, Blăjeni

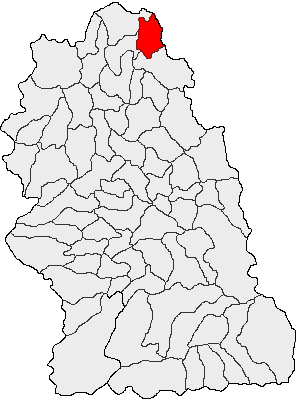
- Location in Hunedoara County

- Location in Romania
- Coordinates: 46°14′N 22°54′E
- Country: Romania
- County: Hunedoara

Government
  - Mayor (2024–2028): Horia Flavius Jurca (PNL)
- Area: 88.62 km^{2} (34.22 sq mi)
- Elevation: 413 m (1,355 ft)
- Population (2021-12-01): 883
  - Density: 9.96/km^{2} (25.8/sq mi)
- Time zone: UTC+02:00 (EET)
  - Summer (DST): UTC+03:00 (EEST)
- Postal code: 337085
- Area code: +(40) 254
- Vehicle reg.: HD
- Website: blajeni.ro

Blăjeni (Hungarian: Blezseny) is a commune in Hunedoara County, Transylvania, Romania. It is composed of eight villages: Blăjeni, Blăjeni-Vulcan, Criș, Dragu-Brad, Groșuri, Plai, Reț, and Sălătruc.

== Demographics ==
Historical population
| Year | Pop. | ±% |
|---|---|---|
| 1850 | 2,333 | — |
| 1930 | 3,463 | +48.4% |
| 2002 | 1,530 | −55.8% |
| 2011 | 1,192 | −22.1% |
| 2021 | 883 | −25.9% |
Source: Census data

At the 2002 census, the commune had 1,530 inhabitants; 100% of them were ethnic Romanians and 99.4% were Romanian Orthodox. At the 2011 census, Blăjeni had a population of 1,192 (99% Romanians), while at the 2021 census, it had a population of 883 (97.28% Romanians).

== See also ==
- Crișul Alb River
- Țara Moților
- Apuseni Mountains

== Gallery ==
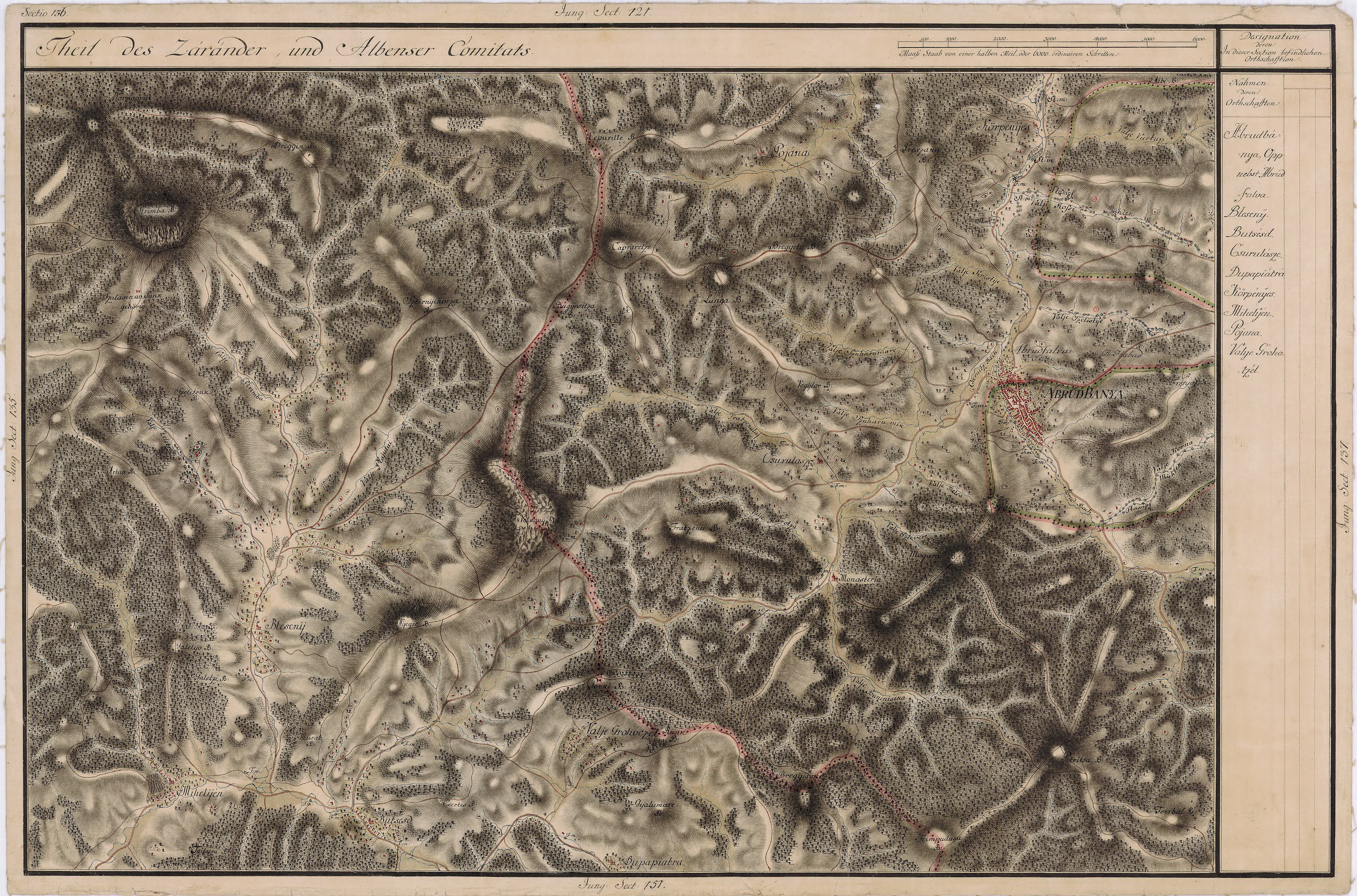
Blăjeni in the Josephinian Land Survey cadastral maps, 1769–1772

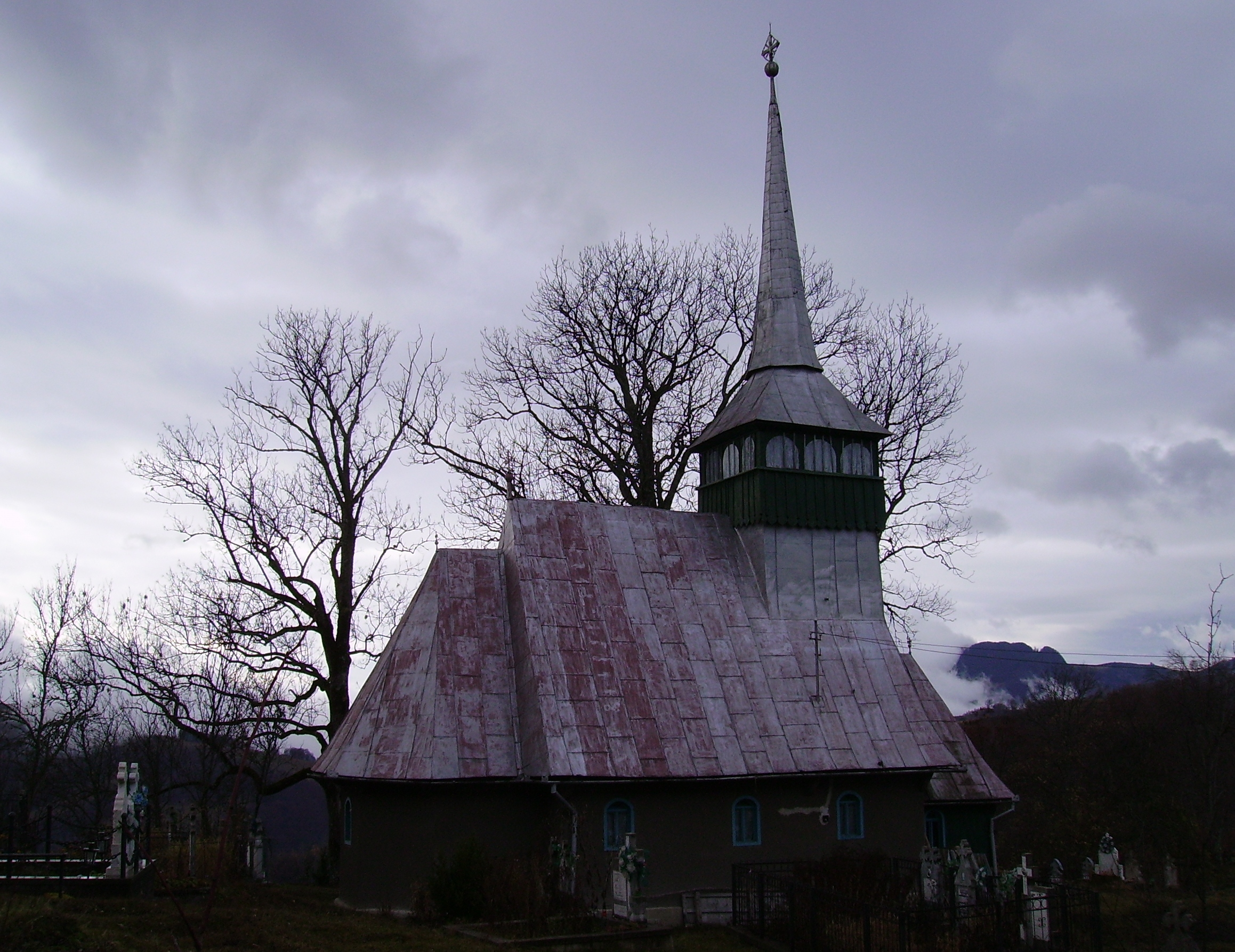
Annunciation wooden church, in Grosuri village

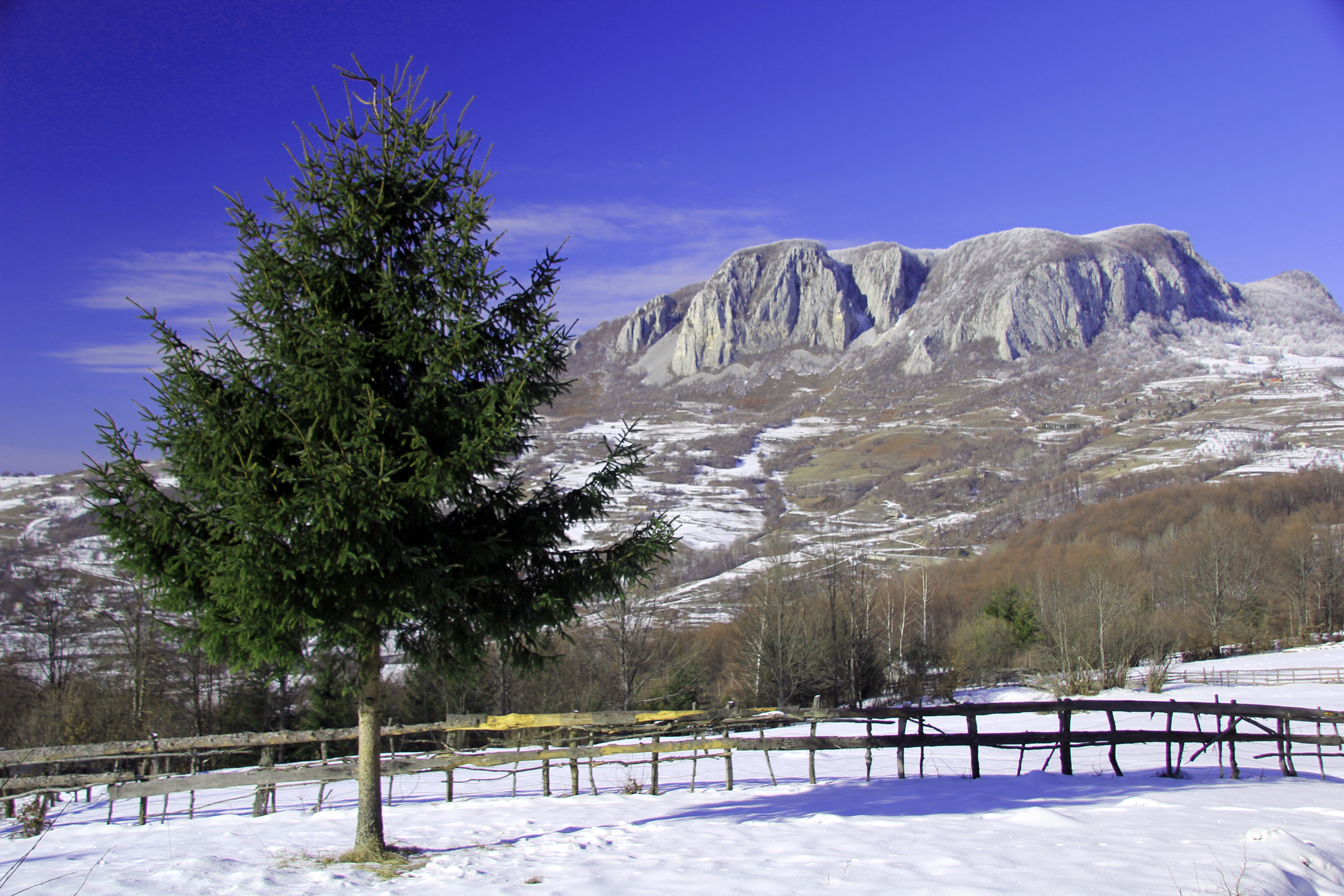
Vulcan Mountain, nearby

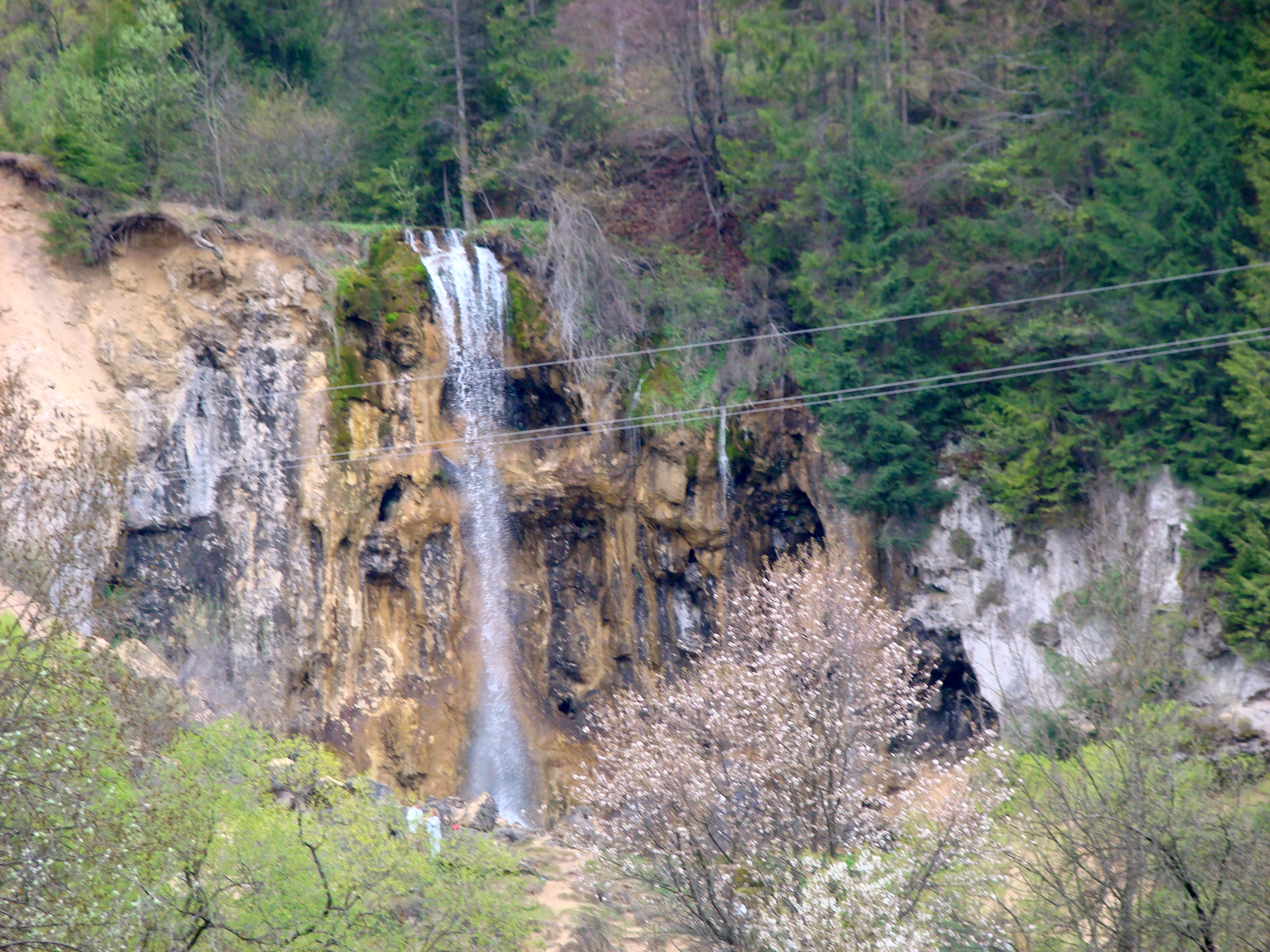
Pișoaia Waterfall, nearby
