= Instincts (album) =

Studio album by Romeo Void
- Released: October 1, 1984
- Recorded: 1984
- Genre: Rock, dance
- Length: 38:14
- Label: Columbia
- Producer: David Kahne

Romeo Void chronology
Benefactor (1982)	Instincts (1984)	Warm, in Your Coat (1992)

Instincts is the third and final studio album by the American band Romeo Void. It was released in 1984 on Columbia Records. The single "A Girl in Trouble (Is a Temporary Thing)" reached No. 35 on the Billboard Hot 100 singles chart. The album was produced by David Kahne.

== Critical reception ==
Professional ratings
Review scores
Source	Rating
AllMusic	3/5 stars
The Philadelphia Inquirer	3/5 stars

The Philadelphia Inquirer wrote that "a walloping beat defines every track, [Debora] Iyall's vocals are smoky and spirited and there are some wonky sax breaks throughout." The Wall Street Journal deemed Instincts "an album of polished, haunting music that lingers with you, like the aftertaste of cognac or the memory of a lover." The Globe and Mail praised Benjamin Bossi's "searing, jazz-tinged saxophone," writing that "the band sounds like nothing else that has gone before." Trouser Press concluded: "Mixing strength with beauty, Romeo Void makes very special dance music for the mind."

== Track listing ==
1. "Out on My Own" (Debora Iyall, Peter Woods, Frank Zincavage, David Kahne) – 3:51
2. "Just Too Easy" (Iyall, Woods, Zincavage, Kahne) – 3:09
3. "Billy's Birthday" (Iyall, Woods, Zincavage) – 4:10
4. "Going to Neon" (Kahne) – 3:33
5. "Six Days and One" (Woods, Zincavage) – 4:31
6. "A Girl in Trouble (Is a Temporary Thing)" (Iyall, Woods, Zincavage, Kahne) – 4:17
7. "Say No" (Iyall, Woods, Zincavage, Kahne) – 4:37
8. "Your Life Is a Lie" (Iyall, Woods, Zincavage) – 5:16
9. "Instincts" (Iyall, Woods, Zincavage) – 4:50

=== Bonus track (2003 reissue) ===
1. "In the Dark" (Benjamin Bossi, Larry Carter, Iyall, Zincavage, Woods) – 4:33 Produced by Ian Taylor and Ric Ocasek

== Personnel ==
- Debora Iyall – vocals
- Peter Woods – guitar
- Benjamin Bossi – saxophone
- Frank Zincavage – bass
- Aaron Smith – drums, percussion

Additional personnel

- Larry Carter – drums on bonus track
- Randy Jackson – bass
- Vicki Randle – backing vocals
- Tish Lorenzo – narration

Technical

- François Kevorkian, Jay Mark, Joe Chiccarelli, Ken Kessie – engineers
- Chester Simpson – cover photography

== Charts ==
Album

Year	Chart	Position
1984	The Billboard 200	68

Single

Year	Song	Chart	Position
1984	"A Girl in Trouble (Is a Temporary Thing)"	Billboard Hot 100	35
