= 2018 Washington wildfires =

Wildfire season in Washington, United States

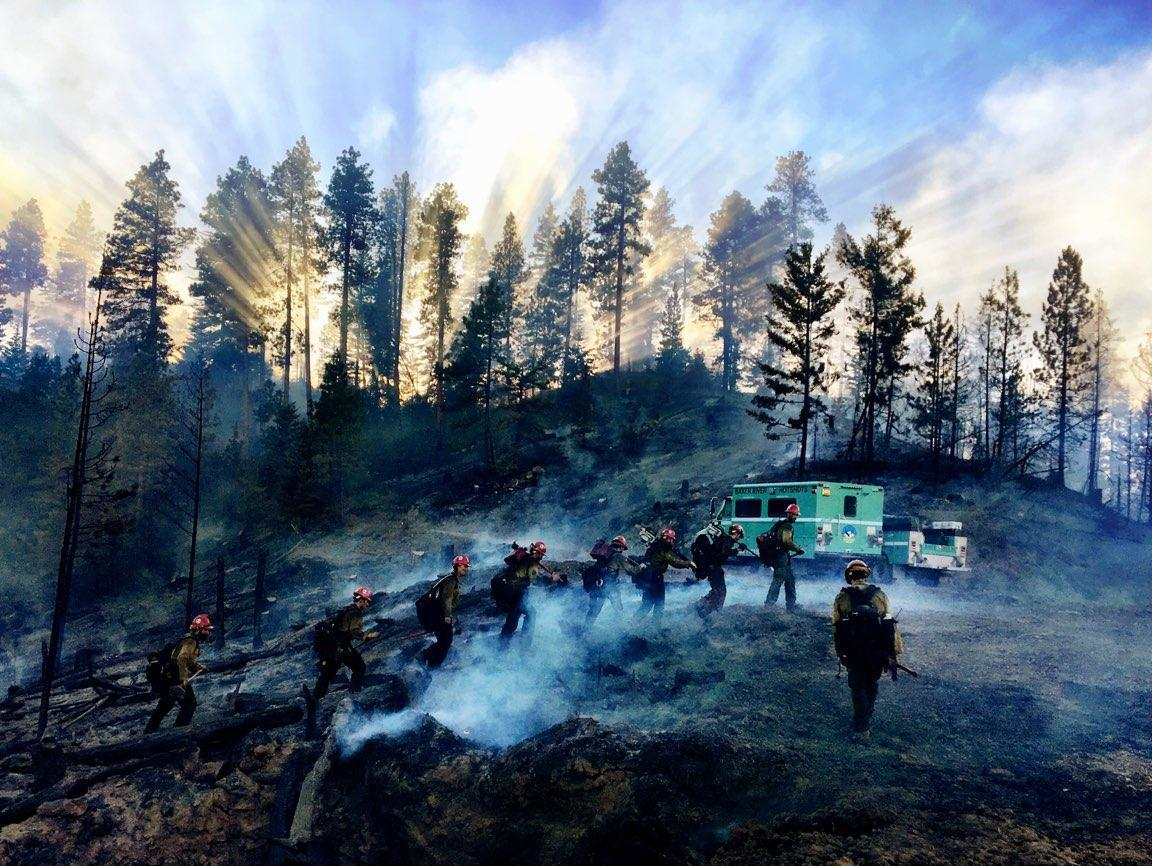
- Fire crew at the Little Camas Fire, July 9
- Date: June–October 2018 Statewide state of emergency: July 31, 2018

The 2018 Washington wildfire season officially began June 1, 2018. A statewide state of emergency was declared by Governor Jay Inslee on July 31.

== Background ==
While the typical "fire season" in Washington varies every year based on weather conditions, most wildfires occur in between July and October. However, hotter, drier conditions can allow wildfires to start outside of these boundaries. Wildfires tend to start at these times of the year after moisture from winter and spring precipitation dries up. Vegetation and overall conditions are the hottest and driest in these periods. The increase of vegetation can make the fires spread easier.

== Training and preparedness ==
State level planning for the fire season began at least as early as January, 2018.

A regional annual meeting was held at Yakima in March to prepare for fighting wildfires. Summer fire rules went into effect on state-owned lands on April 15.

Four hundred firefighters from 36 fire districts and 18 agencies trained to fight forest fires in the Cascade Mountains above Yakima in May.

A 20-year Washington Wildland Fire Protection Strategic Plan under development during the first half of the year was to be released by the Department of Natural Resources to the public in July, 2018.

In June, three firefighting helicopters were staged in Western Washington by the Department of Natural Resources for the first time, prompted by a low 2017 fire season west of the Cascades followed by a dry month of May 2018 causing an abundance of dry fuel, and other weather considerations.

== Season prediction ==
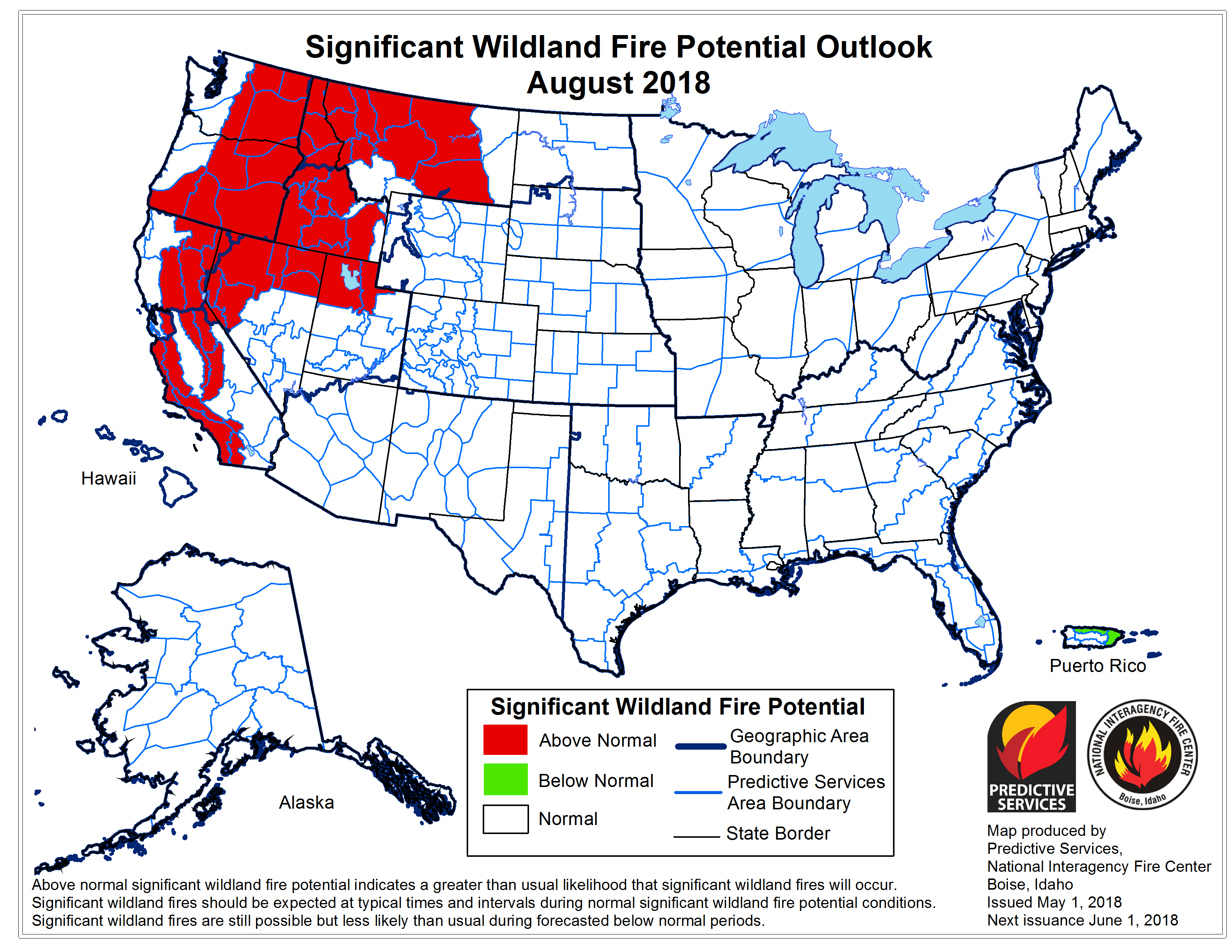
National Interagency Fire Center fire outlook for August 2018

The season predictions issued in May cited drier than average weather conditions and low snow pack in Oregon, but in Washington conditions appeared to be near normal. The water year began October 1, 2017, and by May 1, indicated normal precipitation in the state, but according to National Interagency Fire Center, models that also include Pacific-scale El Niño–Southern Oscillation effects showed high chance of below-normal precipitation and higher-than-normal temperatures through July; these factors led to a prediction of above-normal wildfire risk for the entirety of Eastern Washington through August 2018. Climate scientists said in July that the Palmer Drought Severity Index showed Western Washington to be significantly drier than normal, adding to fire risk there.

== Fires and smoke ==
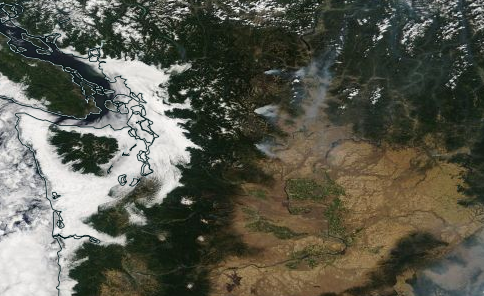
Washington on August 1, 2018. Smoke from Cougar Creek Fire and Crescent Mountain Fire on the east slope of the Cascades is prominent. Smoke at the southeast corner of the state is coming from Northern California.

What may have been the first significant fire of the year occurred on April 24, when 20 acres burned at Woodland, Washington in Clark County, extinguished via aerial attack.

On May 22, a controlled burn initiated by a local resident went wild and burned 300 acres near the Yakima Training Center. An Army helicopter crew was credited with saving homes near Selah by dumping water.

The Soap Lake Fire in early June grew to 2,000 acres (810 ha) and triggered level 3 evacuations in Grant County.

The Ryegrass Coulee Fire on July 9–10 burned 1,600 acres, closed 20 miles of Interstate 90 in both directions for most of a day, and forced the complete evacuation of Vantage, Washington. It was the first of the state's fire season to trigger a level three evacuation or a road closure. The Federal Emergency Management Agency (FEMA) released funds, saying that "the fire threatened such destruction as would constitute a major disaster".

The Little Camas Fire at 47.424°N 120.561°W, in the Cascades south of Leavenworth, Washington, started on July 5 and reached over 300 acres. It caused the evacuation of a bible camp. Over 440 firefighters and three helicopters were sent to contain it.

The Vulcan Mountain Fire at Vulcan Mountain in Ferry County grew to over 20 acres around July 13, before being contained.

Smoke conditions in mid July were judged as good, in contrast to the 2017 season which had Seattle blanketed in smoke and ash around the same time due to fires in British Columbia, Eastern Washington and Oregon.

The Rocky Reach Fire at 47.536°N 120.292°W, near Wenatchee, started on Friday, July 13 and reached over 3,386 acres (1,370 ha) before being contained.

The Boylston Fire started on July 19 again shut down I-90 east of Ellensburg for 24 hours. It burned 80,000 acres, mostly on the Yakima Training Center, caused level three "leave now" evacuations, and destroyed five buildings while being fought by three fixed-wing aircraft and two helicopters. Military personnel and equipment to fight the fire were sent from Fairchild Air Force Base in Spokane and Joint Base Lewis-McChord in the Puget Sound Area. The smoke caused "unhealthy" air conditions in Spokane on July 20.

The Upriver Beacon Fire in Spokane County, on the Spokane city/county border at 47.694°N 117.315°W, caused the evacuation of 800 homes and evacuation warnings for thousands more on July 18. It burned 120 acres (49 ha) before being contained. Nearly all local fire agencies including cities of Spokane, Spokane Valley and Spokane County, and out-of-area fire aircraft, responded.

The Cougar Creek Fire at 47.681°N 120.217°W near Entiat started on July 28 as the result of lightning. Forest recreation users were told to leave.

Smoke from fires in Siberia was visible over southern British Columbia in late July and was assessed to be a possible health impact to Washington residents. On July 29, the Puget Sound Clean Air Agency stated the Puget Sound region would experience "moderate air quality at times with some upper level smoke making for pretty sunsets. This smoke comes from distant fires, mostly originating from Siberia." On July 30, University of Washington meteorology professor Cliff Mass noted the progressively more smoky situation in Seattle from Siberian wildfires, and said a "smoke front" from California's Carr Fire would arrive before sunset.

Parts of Goat Rocks Wilderness were closed for the month of September in response to the Miriam Fire at 46.616°N 121.336°W, reported July 30 as the result of lightning. 400 campers were evacuated.

The Milepost 90 Fire in the Columbia Gorge near Wishram, Washington started on July 31 and reached over 11,000 acres (4,500 ha) by August 1. Level 2 and level 3 evacuation orders were issued near Wishram. Almost 20 miles of State Route 14 were closed in both directions. On August 3, it burned 14,500 acres (5,900 ha) and 85% contained.

Crescent Mountain and Gilbert Fires at 48.451°N 120.579°W near Twisp began with lightning on July 29 and grew quickly to over 100 acres (40 ha) by August 1, driven by evening downslope wind. Four helicopters and other equipment were assigned and smokejumpers sent in to the rough terrain. Hikers and campers were told to leave. Crescent Mountain Fire increased to 7,671 acres (3,104 ha) by August 5. It was controlled as of October 22, 2018 and burned a total 52,000 acres.

The Maple Fire at 47.581°N 123.131°W near the Hamma Hamma River on the Olympic Peninsula sent smoke towards Seattle on August 7. The fire was caused by illegal logging, and burned 3,300 acres (13 km^{2}). The resulting criminal trial was the first time tree DNA had been used in a federal trial in the United States.

== Resources ==
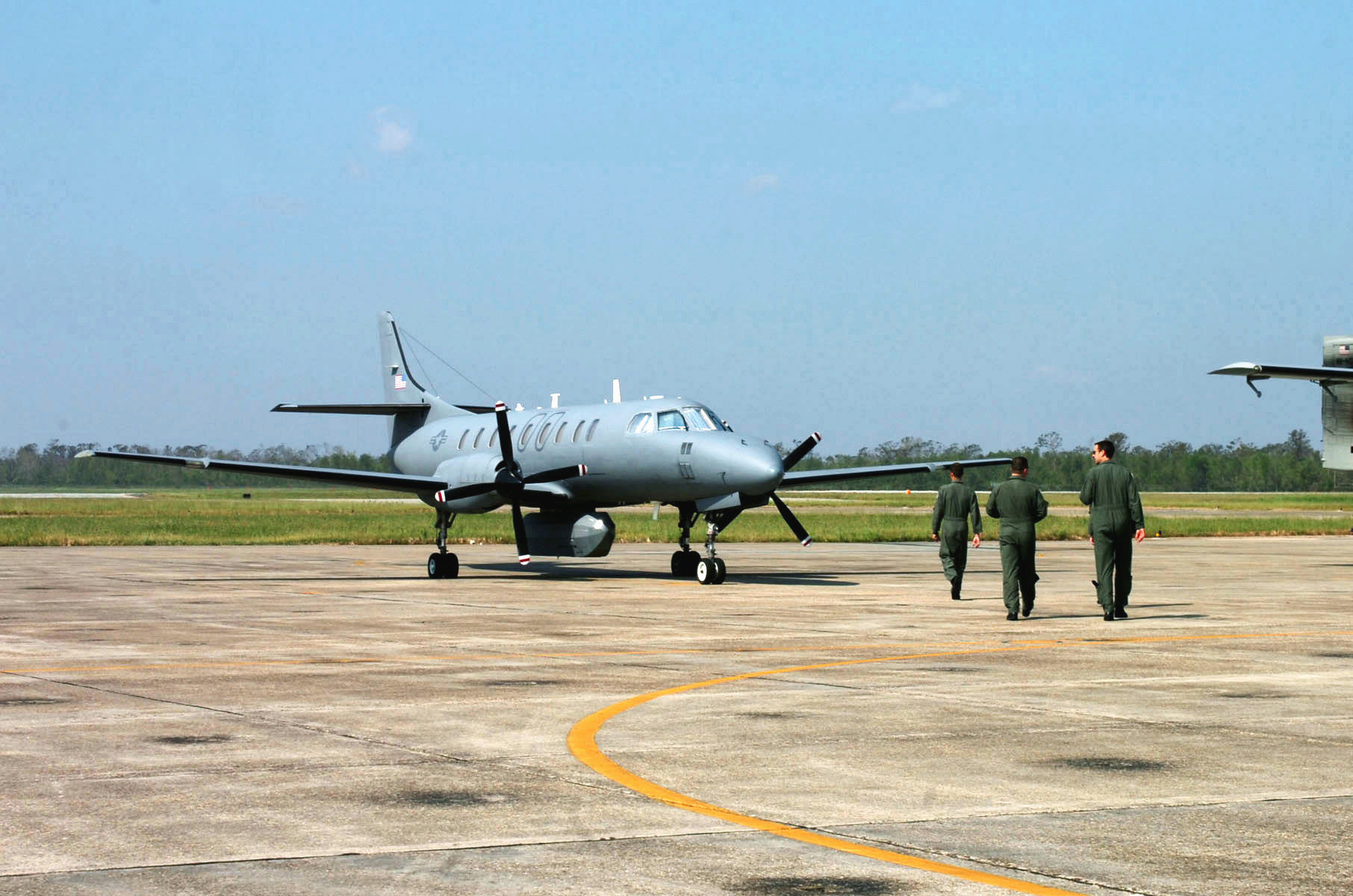
An RC-26 like this one was deployed to provide infrared imagery of fires in the Northwest. Aircraft used for 2005 New Orleans floods pictured.

An infrared thermography-capable RC-26 surveillance aircraft and support crew from Washington Air National Guard were deployed in support of the National Interagency Fire Center for the third year in a row.

The Governor's July 31 state of emergency declaration allowed the Washington National Guard to be deployed; two Blackhawk helicopters at Fairchild Air Force Base were quickly allocated to firefighting.

== See also ==
- List of Washington wildfires
