= It's a Condition =

Studio album by Romeo Void
- Released: July 1981
- Recorded: 1981
- Studio: Mobius Music, San Francisco, California
- Genre: Post-punk
- Length: 38:09
- Label: 415
- Producer: David Kahne

Romeo Void chronology
It's a Condition (1981)	Never Say Never EP (1981)

Professional ratings
Review scores
Source	Rating
AllMusic	3/5 stars
Robert Christgau	B

It's a Condition is the first studio album by American new wave band Romeo Void, released in 1981. It was released on CD by Wounded Bird Records, together with Strange Language, Debora Iyall's 1986 solo album, in July 2007, and digitally in 2011. The cover artwork was by Debora Iyall.

== Reception ==
NME said, "like most debut albums, it unsatisfactory when viewed alongside the live show. Despite this, it is the most exciting disc of the year to date - much of which is due to Iyall's lyrical visions and images as she journeys through an urban vacuum."

== Track listing ==
All songs written by Debora Iyall, Peter Woods, and Frank Zincavage, except where noted.

1. "Myself to Myself" – 3:43
2. "Nothing for Me" (Iyall, Zincavage) – 3:36
3. "Talk Dirty (to Me)" – 4:44
4. "Love Is an Illness" – 3:42
5. "White Sweater" – 4:47
6. "Charred Remains" – 3:03
7. "Confrontation" – 2:41
8. "Drop Your Eyes" (Iyall, Zincavage) – 3:37
9. "Fear to Fear" – 2:38
10. "I Mean It" (Benjamin Bossi, Iyall, Woods, Zincavage) – 5:38

== Personnel ==
- Debora Iyall – vocals
- Peter Woods – guitar
- Benjamin Bossi – saxophone
- Frank Zincavage – bass
- John Haines – drums, percussion

== Chart positions ==
Single

Year	Single	Chart	Position
1981	"Myself to Myself"/"White Sweater"/"Talk Dirty (to Me)"	Billboard Club Play Singles	31
