= Salentin =

Salentin may refer to:

People:

- Hubert Salentin (1822–1910), German painter, associated with the Düsseldorf school of painting
- Salentin IX of Isenburg-Grenzau (1532–1610), Archbishop-Elector of Cologne as "Salentin of Isenburg" from 1567 until 1577
- Salentin of Isenburg-Kempenich, Lord of Isenburg-Kempenich co-ruling with his brothers Rosemann and Theodoric II
- Salentin VI of Isenburg-Neumagen, the Count of Isenburg-Neumagen from 1502 until 1534

Places:

- Grecia Salentin, an area in the peninsula of Salento in southern Italy
- Salentin I or Nieder-Isenburg, a small medieval County in northern Rhineland-Palatinate, Germany

== See also ==
- Salant (disambiguation)
- Salentino
- Salento
- Selent
