= Strange Language =

Studio album by Debora Iyall
- Released: 1986
- Genre: New wave
- Length: 39:12
- Label: Columbia
- Producer: Pat Irwin

Debora Iyall chronology
Strange Language (1986)	Stay Strong (2010)

Strange Language is the debut solo studio album by Cowlitz Native American singer Debora Iyall, released by Columbia in 1986 and produced by Pat Irwin. The album was given its first CD release (as a double set with Romeo Void's It's a Condition) by Wounded Bird Records in 2007.

== Background ==
Following the split of Romeo Void, Iyall embarked on a solo career. She recalled to Punk Globe in 2011: "The record company didn't really like [the album]. I wrote it with the help of a couple of different people and we recorded it and it sunk." In 1987, Iyall began a new job as receptionist for a fashion business while also forming new groups in the San Francisco area. Throughout the 1990s, Iyall turned away from music and returned to her first love, art, and she began working as both an artist and art instructor.

Strange Language features Iyall's former Romeo Void bandmates Benjamin Bossi on saxophone and Aaron Smith on drums. The title track was released as the album's only single and reached No. 27 on the Billboard Hot Dance/Disco Club Play chart.

== Critical reception ==
Professional ratings
Review scores
Source	Rating
AllMusic	2.5/5 stars

Upon release, Billboard commented: "Former Romeo Void vocalist weaves a tapestry of moody, introspective music. Fans of the band looking for a repeat of that group's panache should look elsewhere." Brian Chin of Billboard noted the title track's "polished, pop-dance beat" and "Ono-esque message and vocal treatment". People wrote: "[Iyall's] singing has a harsh, unpleasant edge, so while it's important to listen to the words to get their impact, the listening can be a chore — not to mention the fact that a lot of the tunes seem to be more for dancing than listening."

Cheryl Wenner of The Morning Call wrote: "Iyall's strange language is unfamiliar and likely to be a little disturbing to Romeo Void fans. As she tries to rock above and beyond the late, great San Francisco band, she experiments with conformity and only disappoints. The lyrics are below par, most of the vocals are drowned out, and gone is that old rhythmic drive." Ted Drozdowski of The Boston Globe wrote: "This sales-hungry debut is so overburdened with generic dance tracks and recycled melodies that it robs Iyall's lyrics of their depth and leaves her voice unchallenged. With a few exceptions, it's a characterless record adrift in a commercial void."

Chris Willman of the Los Angeles Times commented: "Iyall's romantic observations seem maudlin, perhaps because they're placed in musical settings that are plenty moody but without any of the old rhythmic drive. Worse yet, producer Pat Irwin has placed her voice in high-tech, hollowed-out, low-key settings that, to work at all, would require her to be a technically accomplished singer." In a retrospective review, Stewart Mason of AllMusic commented: "The songs lack the Joy Division-inspired urgency of Romeo Void's best songs, and their comparative mellowness blunts the impact of Iyall's lyrics. That said, at least half of these songs are quite good."

== Track listing ==
Side one
No.	Title	Writer(s)	Length
1.	"Strange Language"	Debora Iyall; Pat Irwin	4:30
2.	"Another Heartbeat"	Iyall; David Nelson; Irwin	4:40
3.	"L.A. (Remember Me Tonight)"	Iyall; Irwin	3:58
4.	"Chilly This Evening"	Iyall; Paul Keister; Irwin	3:36
5.	"Glance"	Iyall; Nelson; Irwin	3:51

Side two
No.	Title	Writer(s)	Length
6.	"Crazy"	Iyall; Keister	3:45
7.	"Give Up on You"	Iyall; Keister; Steve Bauer; Don Nguyen; Steve DeMartis	2:47
8.	"Meet You Downtown"	Iyall; Keister	4:37
9.	"Jody"	Iyall; Richard Sohl	3:30
10.	"After a Party"	Iyall; Irwin; Bob Smith; Aaron Smith; Sohl; Keister	3:59
Total length:			39:12

== Personnel ==
Credits are adapted from the Strange Language liner notes.

- Debora Iyall — lead vocals, backing vocals
- Diana Lavallee Korematsu, Donna Franklin, Jenni Muldaur, Kitty Beethoven — backing vocals
- Pat Irwin — guitar, synthesizer, saxophone, clarinet
- Benjamin Bossi — saxophone
- Richard Sohl — piano, synthesizer
- Bongo Bob Smith — synthesizer
- Paul Keister — bass
- Aaron Smith — drums

Production

- Pat Irwin — producer
- Bill Thompson — engineer
- Howie Weinberg — mastering
