= Benefactor (album) =

Studio album by Romeo Void
- Released: 1982
- Genre: Dance-rock
- Length: 38:04
- Label: Columbia
- Producer: Ian Taylor; Ric Ocasek

Romeo Void chronology
Never Say Never EP (1981)	Benefactor (1982)	Instincts (1984)

Benefactor is the second studio album by the American band Romeo Void, released in 1982. It was released on CD in 2006 by Wounded Bird Records, with their Never Say Never EP as four bonus tracks. The version of the song "Never Say Never" is a shorter, "clean" edit suitable for general radio broadcast.

== Critical reception ==
Professional ratings
Review scores
Source	Rating
AllMusic	3/5 stars

The New York Times wrote that "too much of Benefactor suffers from Miss Iyall's artsy overwriting... And the feverishly clever arrangements can't quite disguise the band's lack of strong melodies." The Boston Phoenix opined that "As scrambled as its material gets, Benefactor is saved by the struggle this band brings to their rock ‘n’ roll — their conviction that escape routes from lovelessness are worth fighting for, worth opening up for the audience."

== Track listing ==
All tracks are written by Benjamin Bossi, Larry Carter, Debora Iyall, Peter Woods, and Frank Zincavage, except where noted.

No.	Title	Writer(s)	Length
1.	"Never Say Never"		3:27
2.	"Wrap It Up"	Isaac Hayes, David Porter	3:15
3.	"Flashflood"		4:55
4.	"Undercover Kept"		6:05
5.	"Ventilation"		3:55
6.	"Chinatown"		3:18
7.	"Orange"		4:15
8.	"Shake the Hands of Time"		3:19
9.	"S.O.S."		5:30
Total length:			38:04

2006 reissue bonus tracks; taken from the Never Say Never EP
No.	Title	Length
10.	"Never Say Never"	6:06
11.	"In the Dark"	4:33
12.	"Present Tense"	5:47
13.	"Not Safe"	3:57
Total length:		58:27

== Personnel ==
Romeo Void

- Debora Iyall – vocals
- Peter Woods – guitar
- Benjamin Bossi – saxophone
- Frank Zincavage – bass
- Larry Carter – drums, percussion

Additional musicians

- Walter Turbitt – guitar on track 9
- Marybeth O'Hara – backing vocals on track 7
- Norman Salant – saxophone on track 7

Production

- Ian Taylor – producer
- Ric Ocasek – additional production on track 1

== Charts ==
Album

Item	Year	Chart	Position
Never Say Never (EP)	1982	Pop Albums	147
Benefactor	1982	Pop Albums	119
