= 2018 Maple Fire =

Wildfire in Washington, United States

Maple Fire
- Part of the 2018 Washington wildfires
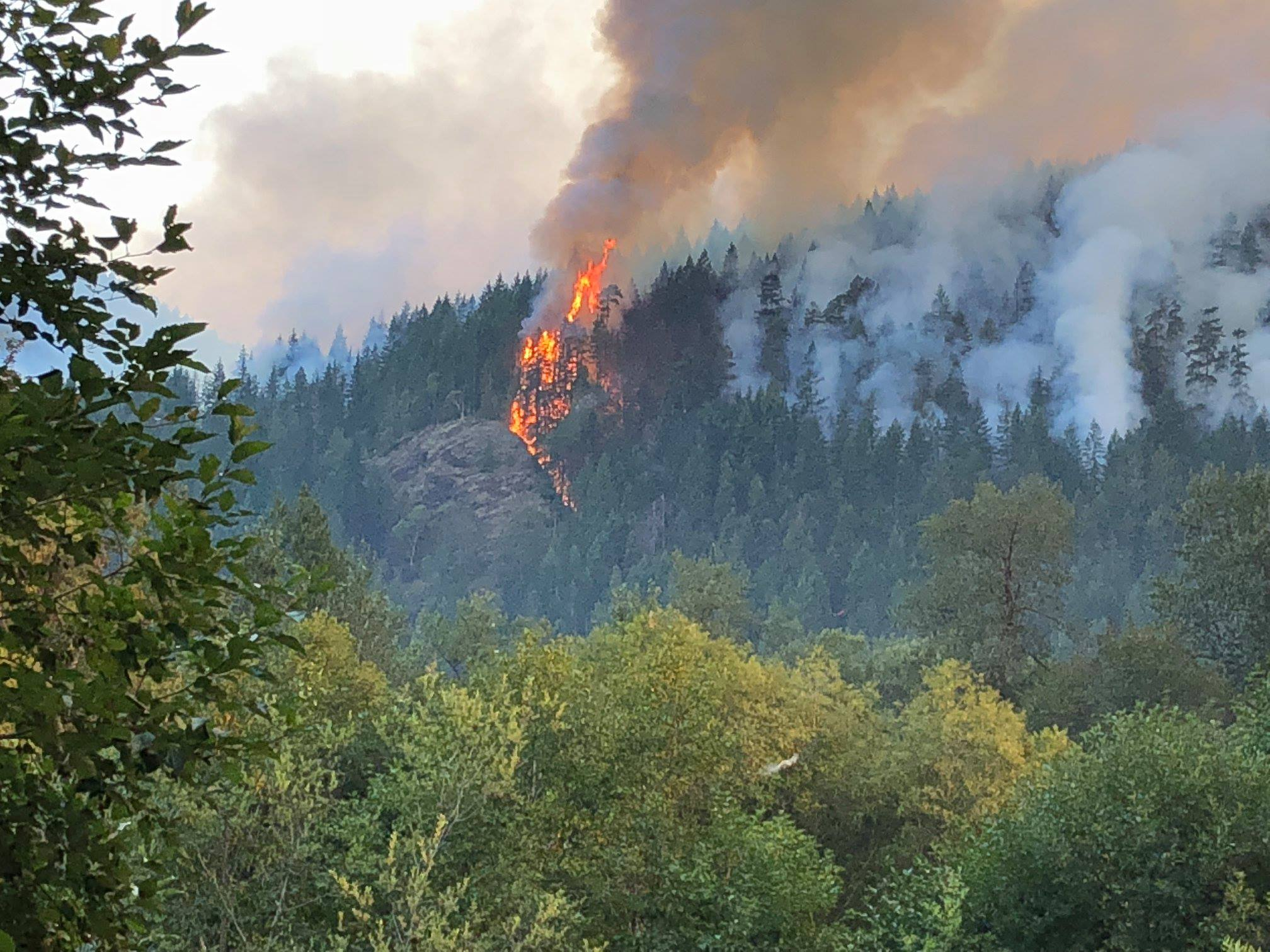
- Date: August 3, 2018 – November 2018
- Location: Jefferson County, Washington, United States
- Coordinates: 47.578°N 123.13°W

Statistics
- Burned area: 3,300 acres (13 km^{2})
- Land use: National Park

Impacts
- Structures lost: 0
- Cost: $4.5 million

Ignition
- Cause: Human caused
- Motive: Illegal logging

Map
- Location of fire in Washington.

The Maple Fire was a wildfire on Jefferson Ridge in the Olympic Mountains, approximately 23 miles north of Shelton, Washington in the United States. The fire was caused by illegal logging activities, and the resulting criminal trial was the first time that tree DNA has ever been used in a federal trial in the United States.

== Fire ==
The Maple Fire was started by a crew of timber poachers who were attempting to steal Big-Leaf Maple trees from the Olympic National Park. The crew discovered a potential target tree on August 3, but were unable to harvest it due to a wasp nest at the base of the tree. After failing to exterminate the nest with insecticides, the crew deliberately set fire to the nest. The fire grew out of control, and the logging crew fled.

The fire was reported the following day, August 4. It was not considered contained until October 10, and continued to smolder until seasonal rains finally extinguished it in November. The Maple Fire ultimately burned 3,300 acres (13 km^{2}) of wildland. A command center was initially established at nearby Brinnon, Washington, but quickly grew too large, and was relocated to Shelton, Washington. At one point, as many as 258 personnel were involved in firefighting efforts. Some unmanned aerial vehicles, and two Washington Air National Guard helicopters were also dispatched to combat the blaze. The firefighting efforts cost $4.5 million.

== Criminal proceedings ==
One member of the illegal logging crew pleaded guilty to theft of public property and setting timber afire in December 2019. He was sentenced to 30 months in prison in September 2020. After a 6 day jury trial in July 2021, another member of the crew was convicted of conspiracy, theft of public property, depredation of public property, trafficking in unlawfully harvested timber, and attempting to traffic in unlawfully harvested timber. He was sentenced to 20 months in prison in November 2021.

Key evidence in the jury trial was DNA samples from wood the crew had sold to nearby mills. These samples were compared with samples in a database of Big Leaf Maple DNA. Analysis showed a very high likelihood that the wood had been poached. This was the first time that tree DNA had ever been used in a federal trial.
