= Soap Lake =

Lake in Washington, United States

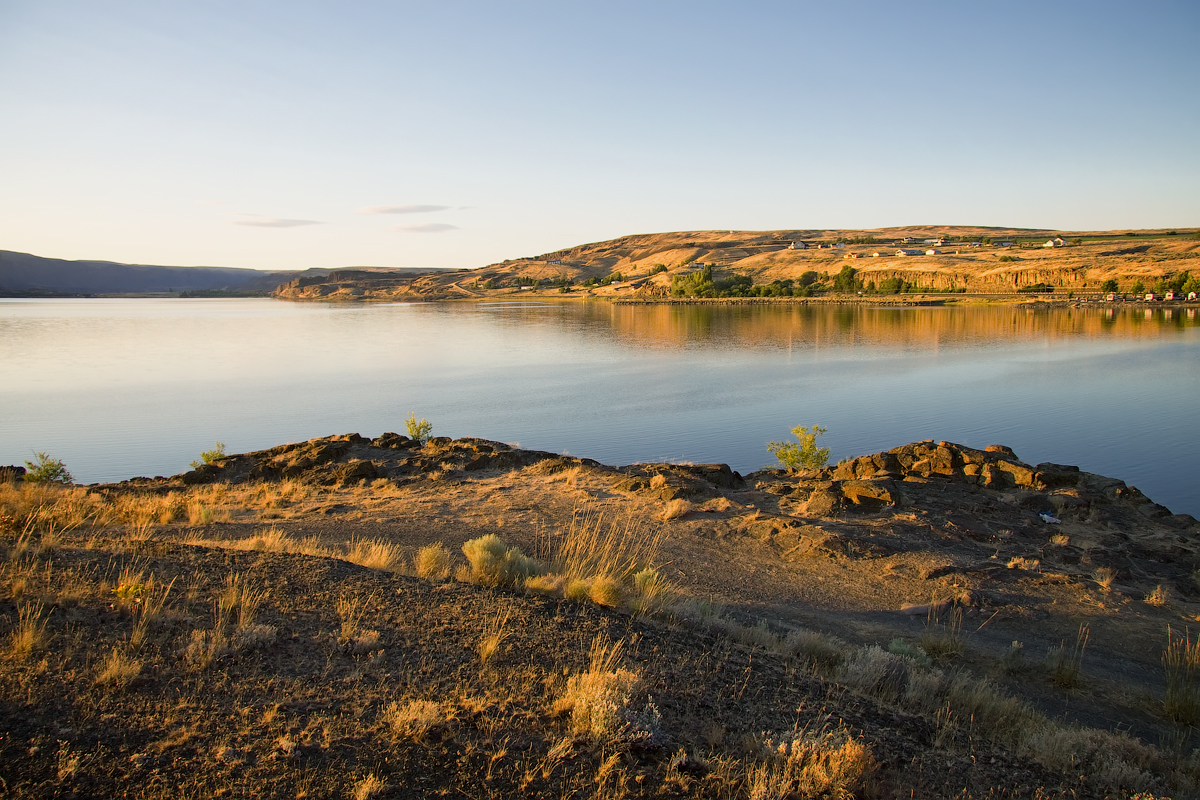
- View from the south shore of Soap Lake

- Location within Washington (state) Location within the United States
- Location: Grant County, Washington, United States
- Coordinates: 47°24′18″N 119°29′51″W
- Type: meromictic, saline
- Basin countries: United States
- Surface area: 2 sq mi (5.2 km^{2})
- Max. depth: 70 ft (21 m)
- Surface elevation: 1,079 ft (329 m)

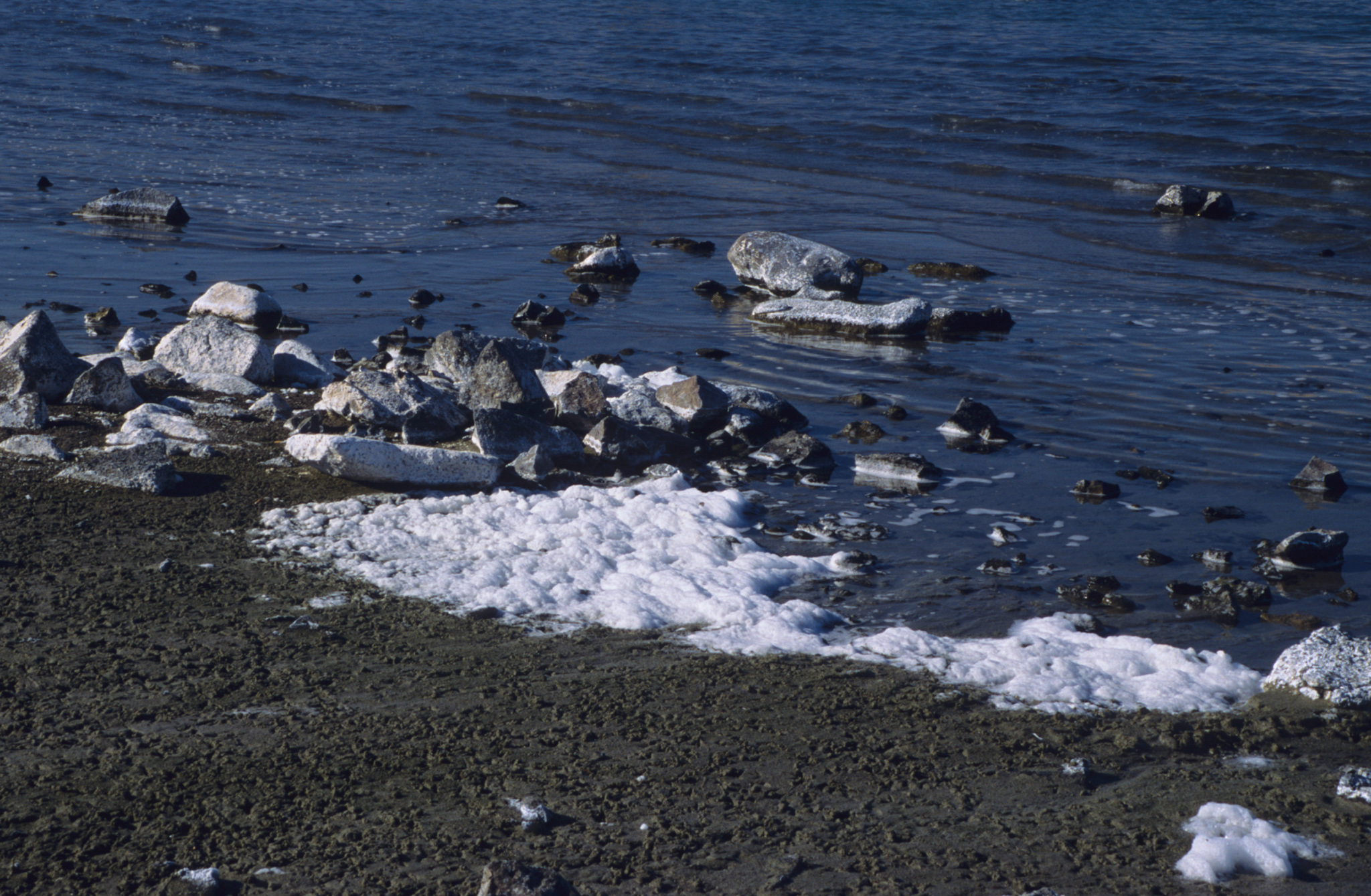
Foam on the shore of Soap Lake

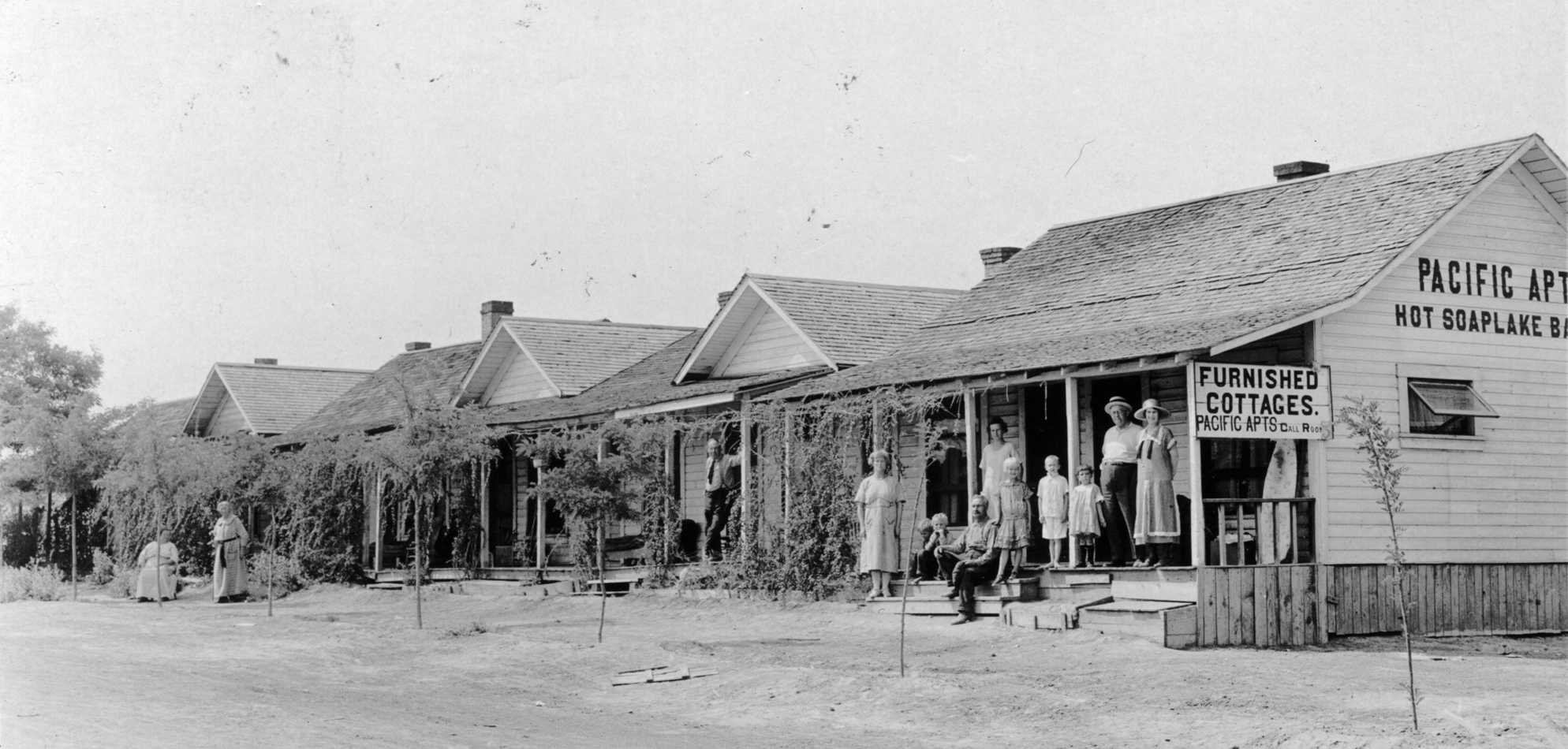
Pacific Apartments, nationally advertised as the social center and health resort of the Columbia Basin (1928)

Soap Lake is a meromictic soda lake in the town of Soap Lake, Washington, formed by the Missoula Floods at the foot of the Grand Coulee. The lake gets its name from the naturally occurring foam that gives its water a soapy appearance, and because the lake's mineral-rich waters have a slick, soapy feel. The lake is approximately 2 square miles (5.2 km^{2}) in area and 70 feet (21 m) deep.

== Qualities ==
Soap Lake's mineral-rich waters have long been thought to have medicinal value. In fact, it is said that rival native tribes would call a truce when they came to Soap Lake to relax and heal themselves and their animals. This is verified by recorded history and the number of Native American artifacts found in the area over the years. Washington State tourist guides in the 1920s referred to Soap Lake as the "world's greatest mineral sea" and people afflicted with Buerger's disease said that bathing in the lake cured their illness. The city of Soap Lake bills itself as "Washington's Health Resort".

There are 23 different minerals in Soap Lake water. Water quality assays conducted since 1910 to test the mineral content of Soap Lake water have shown that the mineral content of the lake has declined. Although it is not known what causes the foam, its quantity has declined since the construction of canals linking Soap Lake to upstream lakes and the Grand Coulee Dam. It is now rare to see any foam except on windy days.

However, compared to the ocean and other known naturally occurring mineral resources in the world, Soap Lake still has the highest diverse mineral content of any body of water on the planet. Soap Lake water also contains ichthyols, an oil-like substance sold over the counter in Europe to treat infections and abrasions. The ichthyol in Soap Lake water most likely come from decomposition of tiny brine-like red shrimp that flourish in the water from late spring to mid-summer. Like the Dead Sea, the high mineral content of the lake makes the water very buoyant.

The alkalinity of the lake is similar to that found on the moons of Jupiter. Because of this, in 2002 the National Science Foundation awarded a grant to researchers from Central Washington University to study the lake to learn about the possibility of life on Mars.

== Mineral content ==
As of 2000:

Element	Milligrams/Liter
Sodium	5760
Bicarbonate	2480
Sulfate	2540
Carbonate	3840
Chloride	2290
Potassium	504
Organic nitrogen	0.9
Fluoride	7.2
Ortho-phosphate	6.3
Nitrate	0.7
Calcium	2.5
Magnesium	2.9

Less than 0.01 mg/L of aluminum, iron, copper, rubidium, lithium, strontium, barium, chromium, lead, manganese, titanium, vanadium, and boron.

== See also ==
- Rio Tinto
