= Soap Lake, Washington =

Soap Lake
- City
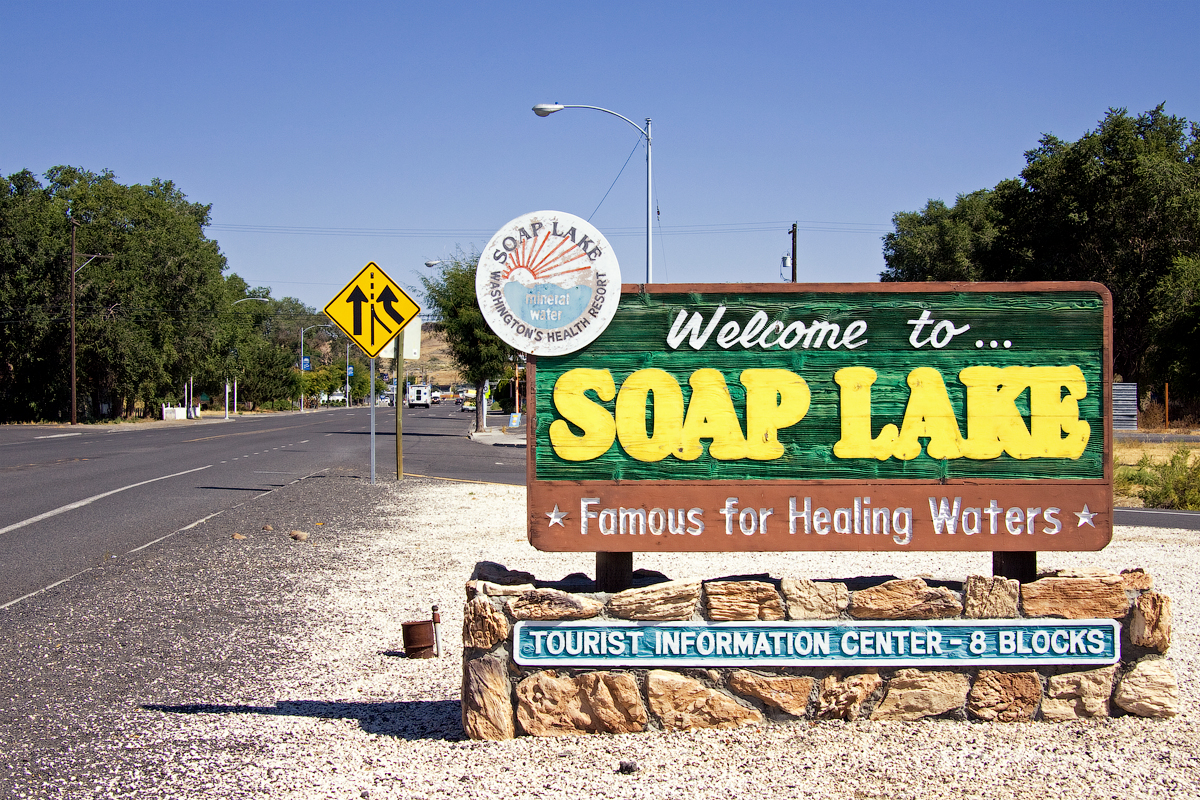
- Welcome sign in Soap Lake

- Location of Soap Lake, Washington
- Coordinates: 47°23′31″N 119°29′45″W
- Country: United States
- State: Washington
- County: Grant

Government
  - Type: Mayor–council
  - Mayor: Peter Sharp

Area
  - Total: 1.61 sq mi (4.16 km^{2})
  - Land: 1.54 sq mi (3.98 km^{2})
  - Water: 0.069 sq mi (0.18 km^{2})
- Elevation: 1,079 ft (329 m)

Population (2020)
  - Total: 1,691
  - Density: 1,043.0/sq mi (402.69/km^{2})
- Time zone: UTC-8 (Pacific (PST))
  - Summer (DST): UTC-7 (PDT)
- ZIP code: 98851
- Area code: 509
- FIPS code: 53-65345
- GNIS feature ID: 2411918
- Website: soaplakewa.gov

Soap Lake is a city in Grant County, Washington, on the shores of Soap Lake. The population was 1,691 at the 2020 census.

== History ==
Soap Lake was officially incorporated on June 9, 1919.

Growth in the area came to a halt during the Great Depression when drought hit Soap Lake. Because of the lack of water and money, the tourist trade dwindled. But, when Grand Coulee Dam was built, the irrigation canals brought new life into the area. Soap Lake has been internationally known during the past century for its uniquely mineral-rich (23) waters and mud. Many people believe the water and mud to be successful in treatment of a variety of ailments. From the early 1900s to the mid-1940s, there were a number of sanitariums located on Soap Lake.

These early versions of spas were used by visitors from all over the country and the world. When the sanitariums, hotels, and bath houses were full, people slept in tents, and even under their cars, in order to use the water of the lake. In 1933, the Veteran's Administration sent nine veterans, under a special project, to Soap Lake for treatment of Buerger's disease. In November 1938, McKay Hospital was completed. For a number of years, McKay was used as a research center for the study of the therapeutic effect of the water of the lake and the climate.

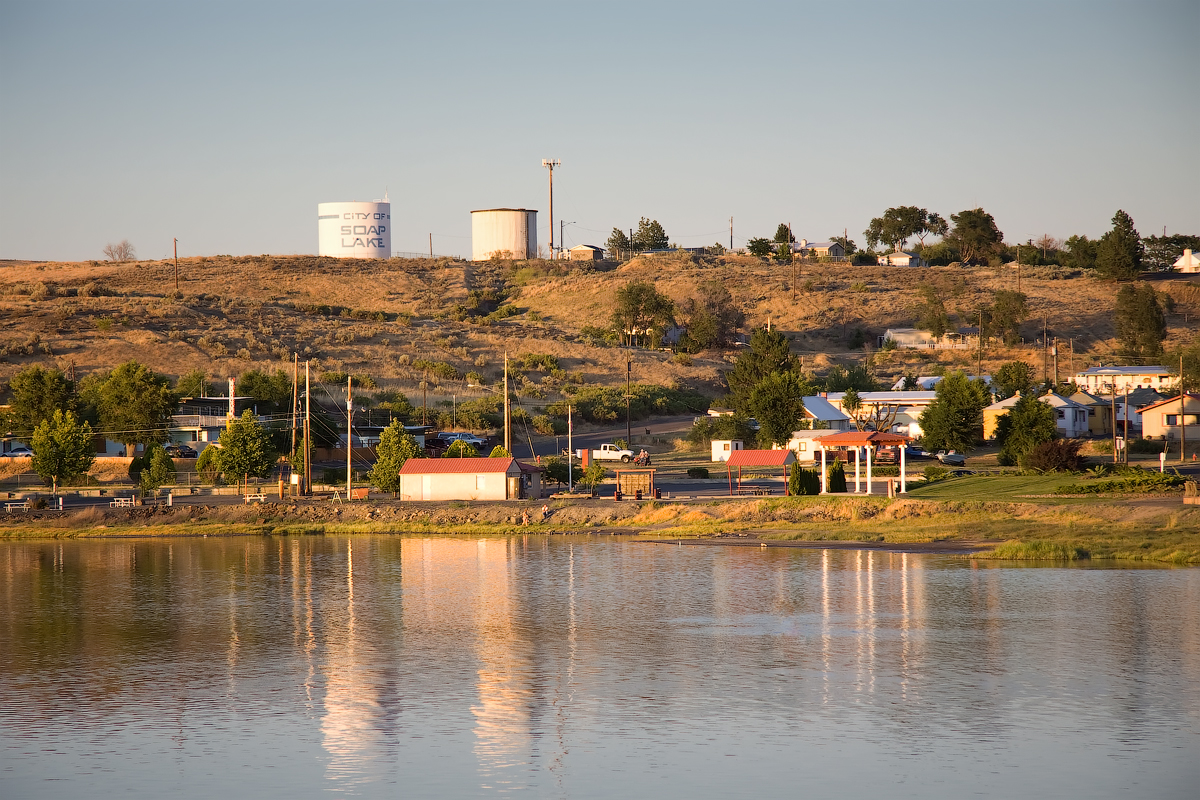
City of Soap Lake

Soap Lake is located in the center of the state of Washington, 20 miles north of Interstate 90 between Seattle and Spokane, sitting in a desert environment with nine inches or less of rainfall per year and 320 days of sun. The current population is approximately 1,740 people. Soap Lake is formed at the end of a chain of lakes running down the center of the Lower Grand Coulee. The Lower Grand Coulee is over a mile and a half wide in places with sheer basalt rock walls rising 900 feet over the coulee floor. State Highway 17, Coulee Corridor-National Scenic Byway, runs through Soap Lake and up the floor of the canyon heading towards Grand Coulee Dam and Canada.

Of the five lakes existing along the Coulee Corridor, Soap Lake has the highest mineral content. The first layer of Soap Lake is made up of about 81 feet of mineral water; the second level is mud-like and consists of a stronger mineral composition with concentrations of unusual substances and microscopic life forms. The lake's two layers have not mixed in thousands of years. The scientific community refers to lakes with this rare condition as meromictic. With only 11 meromictic lakes in the United States, Soap Lake is likely the most radical of all. The scientific community is currently exploring the lake to document some of the unusual qualities. The mineral content of Soap Lake water has been analyzed many times since the mid-1900s. The concentration of different minerals has changed throughout this time. The most recent analysis was conducted in 2000.

In 1950, Soap Lake became a city of Third Class. The population in 1952 was 2051, which grew to 2580 in 1955. At this time the lake was becoming increasingly diluted, due to the seepage of these same life-giving irrigation canals. The City Council petitioned the Department of the Interior to remedy this situation. The Bureau of Reclamation built several wells and pumps to intercept the seepage water, and the end of the 1950s diminished the dilution.

== Tourism ==
The city is currently trying to attract tourism by attempting to revive the health aspect of the lake to attract the spa crowd. The minerals in the lake are said to have healing properties for Buerger's disease. Two older brick buildings along the main street northbound have been renovated to house an art museum and a coffee shop.

Another tourism effort is to install a novel roadside attraction: a 52,000 pound (60 feet in height) lava lamp, formerly a Target advertisement in Times Square. That effort was profiled in the 2010 documentary film, World's Largest.

== Geography and climate ==
According to the United States Census Bureau, the city has a total area of 1.25 square miles (3.24 km^{2}), all of it land.

The nearest weather station to Soap Lake is in Ephrata.

== Demographics ==
Historical population
Census	Pop.	Note	%±
1920	352		—
1930	282		−19.9%
1940	622		120.6%
1950	2,091		236.2%
1960	1,591		−23.9%
1970	1,064		−33.1%
1980	1,196		12.4%
1990	1,149		−3.9%
2000	1,733		50.8%
2010	1,514		−12.6%
2020	1,691		11.7%
U.S. Decennial Census; 2020 Census

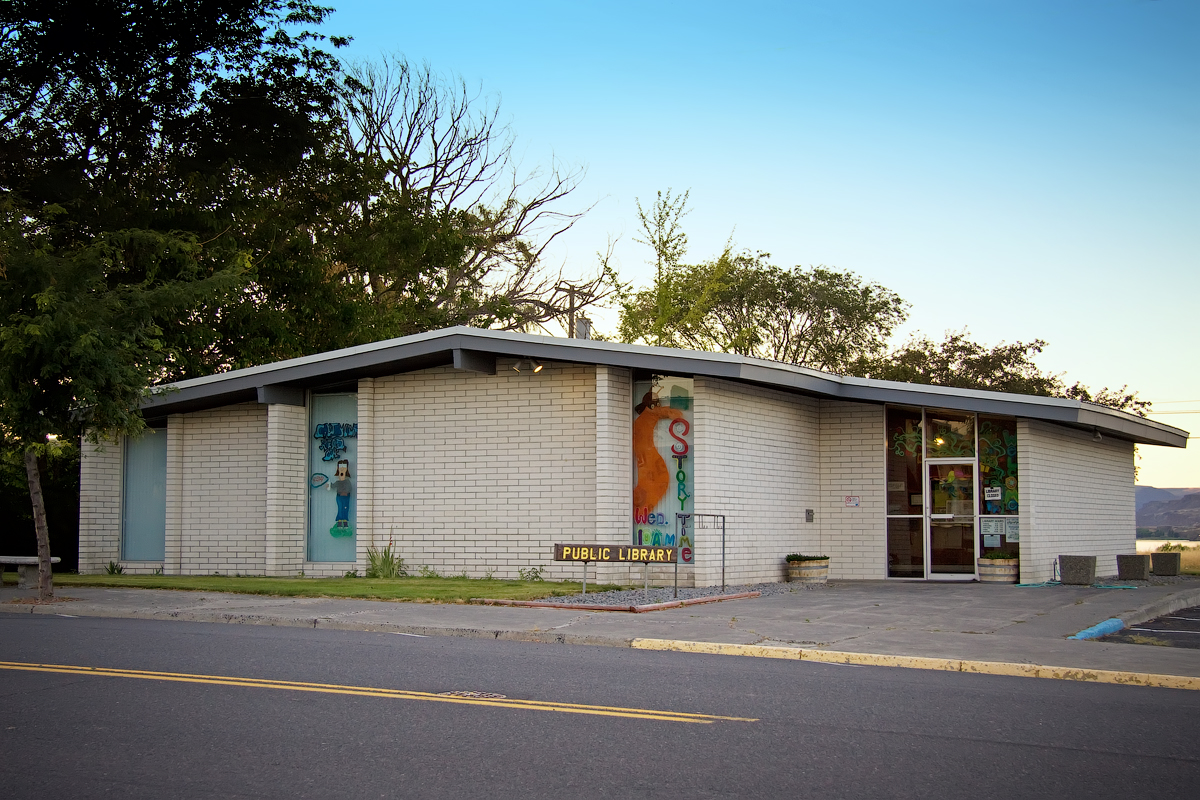
Soap Lake Public Library

=== 2020 census ===
As of the 2020 census, Soap Lake had a population of 1,691. The median age was 52.5 years. 18.9% of residents were under the age of 18 and 29.7% of residents were 65 years of age or older. For every 100 females there were 96.2 males, and for every 100 females age 18 and over there were 96.1 males age 18 and over.

0.0% of residents lived in urban areas, while 100.0% lived in rural areas.

There were 801 households in Soap Lake, of which 20.0% had children under the age of 18 living in them. Of all households, 32.5% were married-couple households, 27.5% were households with a male householder and no spouse or partner present, and 32.6% were households with a female householder and no spouse or partner present. About 42.2% of all households were made up of individuals and 21.1% had someone living alone who was 65 years of age or older.

There were 940 housing units, of which 14.8% were vacant. The homeowner vacancy rate was 2.7% and the rental vacancy rate was 6.4%.

Racial composition as of the 2020 census
Race	Number	Percent
White	1,357	80.2%
Black or African American	13	0.8%
American Indian and Alaska Native	25	1.5%
Asian	15	0.9%
Native Hawaiian and Other Pacific Islander	4	0.2%
Some other race	145	8.6%
Two or more races	132	7.8%
Hispanic or Latino (of any race)	279	16.5%

=== 2010 census ===
As of the 2010 census, there were 1,514 people, 740 households, and 350 families residing in the city. The population density was 1,211.2 inhabitants per square mile (467.6/km^{2}). There were 977 housing units at an average density of 781.6 per square mile (301.8/km^{2}). The racial makeup of the city was 86.0% White, 1.0% African American, 1.9% Native American, 0.6% Asian, 7.7% from other races, and 2.8% from two or more races. Hispanic or Latino of any race were 11.8% of the population.

There were 740 households, of which 20.3% had children under the age of 18 living with them, 33.2% were married couples living together, 10.1% had a female householder with no husband present, 3.9% had a male householder with no wife present, and 52.7% were non-families. 44.5% of all households were made up of individuals, and 16.1% had someone living alone who was 65 years of age or older. The average household size was 1.99 and the average family size was 2.79.

The median age in the city was 48.8 years. 19% of residents were under the age of 18; 8.5% were between the ages of 18 and 24; 18% were from 25 to 44; 30.4% were from 45 to 64; and 24.2% were 65 years of age or older. The gender makeup of the city was 48.9% male and 51.1% female.

The city has a notable Ukrainian population as well, with a church, along with a few stores in its main core selling various Ukrainian, Russian, and other Eastern European products.

=== 2000 census ===
As of the 2000 census, there were 1,733 people, 778 households, and 427 families residing in the city. The population density was 1,434.0 people per square mile (553.0/km^{2}). There were 996 housing units at an average density of 824.2 per square mile (317.8/km^{2}). The racial makeup of the city was 90.02% White, 0.87% African American, 1.21% Native American, 0.23% Asian, 3.92% from other races, and 3.75% from two or more races. Hispanic or Latino of any race were 11.77% of the population.

There were 778 households, out of which 22.2% had children under the age of 18 living with them, 40.6% were married couples living together, 10.3% had a female householder with no husband present, and 45.0% were non-families. 38.8% of all households were made up of individuals, and 15.4% had someone living alone who was 65 years of age or older. The average household size was 2.17 and the average family size was 2.91.

In the city, the population was spread out, with 23.9% under the age of 18, 7.1% from 18 to 24, 21.0% from 25 to 44, 23.1% from 45 to 64, and 24.9% who were 65 years of age or older. The median age was 44 years. For every 100 females, there were 90.2 males. For every 100 females age 18 and over, there were 86.8 males.

The median income for a household in the city was $20,459, and the median income for a family was $25,000. Males had a median income of $27,656 versus $21,771 for females. The per capita income for the city was $13,753. About 26.3% of families and 30.6% of the population were below the poverty line, including 50.5% of those under age 18 and 15.2% of those age 65 or over.

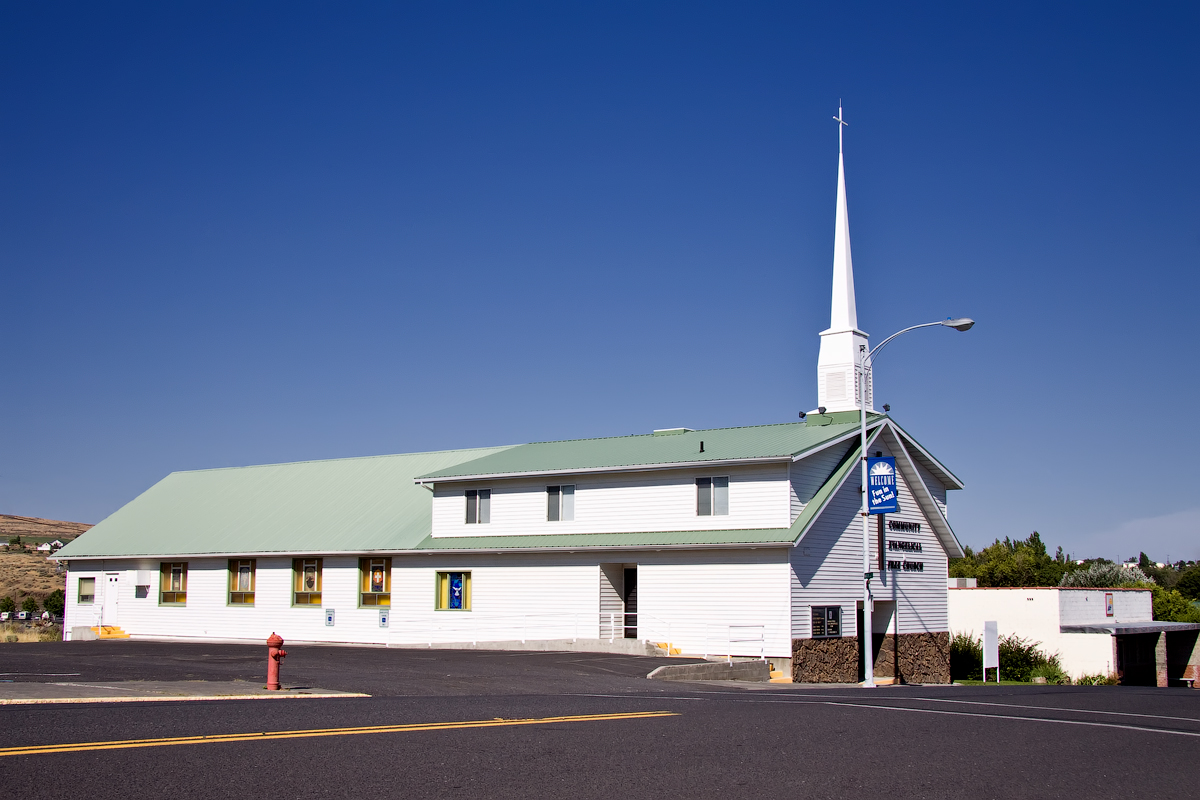
The Community Evangelical Free Church of Soap Lake.

== Education ==
The city is served by the Soap Lake School District.

== Notable people ==
- Bonnie Guitar, country singer
- Sam Israel, real estate investor
- Debora Iyall, singer and artist
- Kirk Stevan Smith, bishop
- Catherine May Wood, serial killer

== See also ==
- Soap Lake Fire
