= Salant =

Salant may refer to:

== People ==
- Henry Salant (1874–1952), New York state senator
- Norman Salant (born 1953), American musician
- Richard S. Salant (1914-1993), American television executive
- Shmuel Salant (1816-1909), Ashkenazi Chief Rabbi of Jerusalem
- Stephen Salant, American economist
- Zundel Salant (1786-1866), Ashkenazi rabbi

== Places ==
- Salantai, also known as Salant, the basis of family names of 3 famous rabbis, 2 of whom are named above.
