= Soap Lake Fire =

2018 wildfire in Washington, United States

- Part of the 2018 Washington wildfires
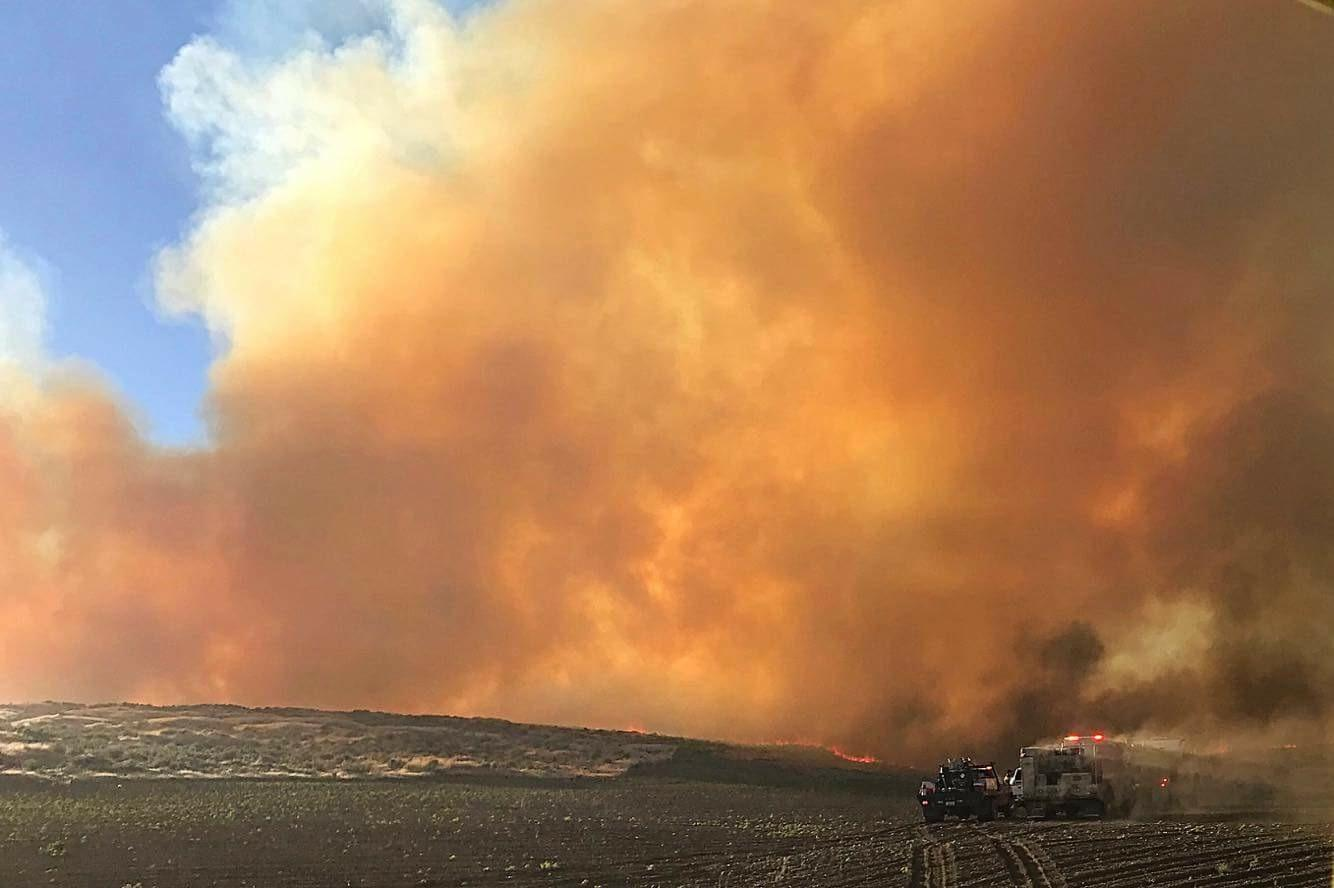
- Soap Lake Fire on June 11, 2018
- Date: June 11, 2018 – June 14, 2018
- Location: Soap Lake, Washington, United States
- Coordinates: 47.396°N 119.484°W

Statistics
- Burned area: 2,063 acres (8 km^{2})

Impacts
- Structures lost: 1

Map
- Location of fire in Washington.

The Soap Lake Fire was a wildfire four miles north of Soap Lake in Grant County, Washington in the United States. The fire started on June 11, 2018. It burned a total of 2,063 acres (8 km^{2}). The fire was contained on June 14. The fire threatened numerous homes and outbuildings and an estimated 50 residents.

== Events ==
The Soap Lake Fire started on June 11, 2018 at 4:30 p.m. along State Route 17, four miles north of Soap Lake in Washington. The fire grew rapidly due to strong winds. Many homes and outbuildings were saved while evacuation warnings were put in place for approximately 50 area residents.

After midnight on June 12, the fire had reportedly burned 2,000 acres (8 km^{2}) of grass, sage and brush and was 50 percent contained. One small outbuilding was destroyed by the fire. The next day, June 13, the fire had grown to 2,063 acres (8 km^{2}) and was 90 percent contained with no new signs of growth.

The fire was 100 percent contained by noon on June 14, 2018. The cause of the fire remains unreported by the Bureau of Land Management, who oversaw the fire.
