= Norman Salant =

American singer-songwriter

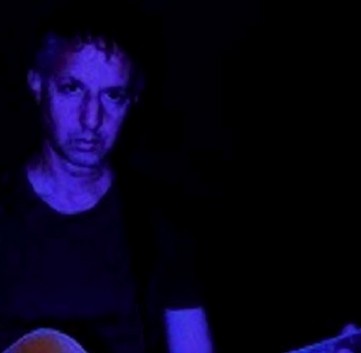

Background information
- Born: 1953 (age 72–73); The Bronx, New York
- Genres: Rock, pop, jazz, world, Middle Eastern, avant-garde, experimental, minimalism
- Occupations: Musician, composer, arranger, producer
- Instruments: Saxophone, guitar, voice
- Years active: 1973–present
- Labels: Northcove Music; Alive Records; Go Records
- Website: normansalant.com

Norman Salant is a songwriter, saxophonist, composer and producer.

== Biography ==
=== Early life and career ===
Salant was born in 1953 and raised in The Bronx, New York. As a youth, he studied guitar and oboe, before teaching himself to play the saxophone as a teen. In 1973, while attending college at SUNY Buffalo, Salant joined experimental free-form rock group Charles Octet, originated by Chuck Hammer. The band had difficulty finding an audience, and when the group disbanded, Salant returned to New York City, where he briefly joined a disco band. He quit and moved to San Francisco in 1977. During the late 1970s, Salant contributed saxophone to a variety of jazz, rock and avant-garde projects.

=== Saxaphone Demonstrations ===
Officially released in December 1981, his first solo album Saxaphone Demonstrations was named one of Trouser Press's Ten Best Records of 1982. The album features "experiments with massed, minimalist-riff saxes," and the single "Accidents" (an adaptation of Blondie's "Accidents Never Happen"). Heavy with multi-tracked and electronically altered saxophones, Saxaphone Demonstrations [sic] has been described as being influenced by David Bowie's Low, and in general being difficult to classify. The album's title contains a deliberate misspelling of the word "saxophone" in an attempt to emphasize Salant's different approach.

=== Sax Talk ===
In January 1982, shortly after the release of Saxaphone Demonstrations, Salant put together the Norman Salant Group, "an appealing and talented band that… hit the Bay Area club circuit out of thin air." Along with Salant on saxophone, the six-piece band was composed of Jeff Nathanson (guitar, synthesizer), Jeff Kaplan (guitar), Morey Goldstein (saxophone/clarinet), Steve Ashman (bass) and Bruce Slesinger of the Dead Kennedys (drums). The band earned quick success in the local club scene, headlining shows and opening for Mike Oldfield and X.

1984 saw the release of Salant's LP Sax Talk. Recorded with some members of the Norman Salant Group, along with electronic musicians Gregory Jones and Roy Sablosky, the album has Middle Eastern, funk, new wave, dance and electronic influences. Two members of Romeo Void also make appearances. In March 1985, Sax Talk was featured on the cover of CMJ New Music Report.

=== Saxophone Duo ===
Salant began collaborating with Benjamin Bossi following the dissolution of Bossi's band Romeo Void in 1984. Working as an unaccompanied duet, often without amplification, the two saxophonists created tightly structured improvisational music with elements of jazz, country, doo-wop and minimalism. After finding success performing in the Bay Area, playing clubs and opening for acts like Big Audio Dynamite and Los Lobos at the Fillmore West, Salant and Bossi moved to New York in 1986 in search of further opportunities, occasionally returning to play in San Francisco.

=== 40-Saxophone Orchestra ===
Salant's minimalist jazz piece for 40 saxophones was created for and had its world premiere at the New York Festival of the Arts' Fête de la Musique in 1989, in celebration of France's bicentennial. The New York Times called it "the most striking" event of the festival.

=== Other notable saxophone work ===
In the 1980s, Salant played on albums by Romeo Void (Benefactor) and The Residents (The Tunes of Two Cities ); wrote and arranged dance-pop songs with singer Lynn Mabry; and acted in a Japanese television commercial for Schick. In the late '80s and early '90s he was active in New York's East Village downtown arts scene. He scored dance performances for various choreographers and performance artists, including Alyson Pou, William Douglas, Mary Abrams, Laura Schandelmeier, and Jody Oberfelder's Overfoot Dance Company. In 1991, he put together The Moving Planet Orchestra, a minimalist improvisational middle-eastern jazz group featuring saxophone, middle-eastern strings and percussion, synthesizer and bass. The following year he began performing "Saxophone Stories," an improvised solo soprano saxophone accompanied only by an electronic tamboura, at venues such as the Danspace Project at St. Mark's Church in the East Village and other venues around New York City. His music has been featured on John Schaeffer's New Sounds program on WNYC.

== Influences ==
Salant has said that his main influences as a saxophonist were Pharoah Sanders ("he could play so beautifully that my heart would stop") and John Coltrane (for his overall mastery).

== Discography ==
=== Saxophone Recordings ===
- Saxaphone Demonstrations (1981, Alive Records)
- Accidents (Single) (1981, Alive Records)
- Sax Talk (1984, CD Presents)
- Sax Talk / No Night Remixes 12" (1984, CD Presents)

Saxophone Archive Series:

- Saxophone Duo: Norman Salant & Benjamin Bossi, San Francisco and New York 1986-1989 (2011, Northcove)
- The 40-Saxophone Orchestra, New York 1989 (2012, Northcove)
- Saxaphone Demonstrations II: Bad Loops – Love Letter, New York 1991 (2012, Northcove)
- Sax/Off: Dance Scores, New York 1991-1992 (2012, Northcove)
- Sax/On: Live Saxophone Recordings, New York, featuring The Moving Planet Orchestra and Saxophone Stories 1991-1993 (2018, Northcove)
- Late Night In The Loft: Saxophone Trio, San Francisco, featuring Gregory Jones and Dave Scheff 1983 (2018, Northcove)
- Norman Salant Group: Golden Arm, San Francisco 1982 (2022, Northcove)

=== Songwriter Recordings ===
4-Song EPs and Singles

- Postcards From the Hanging (Dec 2011, Northcove)
- Tag (Aug 2012, Northcove)
- Wong Gar-Ku (Jan 2013, Northcove)
- Grace (single) (Jul 2013, Northcove)
- Nebraska (single) (Sept 2013, Northcove)
- Nebraska (Nov 2013, Northcove)
- Yodeling Goodbye (Dec 2013, Northcove)
- harrisonbergeron (Mar 2014, Northcove)
- Light (Apr 2014, Northcove)
- Home (Jul 2014, Northcove)

Albums

- Greatest Hits (Feb 2013, Northcove)
- Yodeling Goodbye (May 2018, Northcove)
- Always All Around You (Nov 2018, Northcove)

=== Featured on ===
- Romeo Void – Benefactor (1982, Columbia Records)
- The Residents – The Tunes of Two Cities (1982, Ralph Records)
- Peter Miller – Pre C.B.S. (1981, .22 Records)
