= Romeo Void =

American rock band

- Romeo Void (left to right): Frank Zincavage, Aaron Smith, Debora Iyall, Peter Woods, Benjamin Bossi

Background information
- Origin: San Francisco, California
- Genres: New wave; post-punk
- Years active: 1979–1985; 1993; 2004
- Labels: 415; Columbia
- Past members: Debora Iyall; Peter Woods; Frank Zincavage; Jay Derrah; Benjamin Bossi; John "Stench" Hanes; Larry Carter; Aaron Smith
- Website: romeovoid.net

Romeo Void was an American new wave and post-punk band from San Francisco, California, formed in 1979. The band primarily consisted of saxophonist Benjamin Bossi, vocalist Debora Iyall, guitarist Peter Woods, and bassist Frank Zincavage. The band went through four drummers, starting with Jay Derrah and ending with Aaron Smith. The band released three albums, It's a Condition, Benefactor and Instincts, along with one EP. They are best known for the songs "Never Say Never" and "A Girl in Trouble (Is a Temporary Thing)"; the latter became a top 40 pop single.

The band was started at the San Francisco Art Institute by Iyall and Zincavage. They released a single on the recently formed 415 Records before recording their debut album, which has been deemed a "masterpiece of American post-punk". The success of their second release, a four-song EP titled Never Say Never resulted in a distribution deal with Columbia Records. The band continued to release music and tour until they broke up in 1985. The members have reunited briefly over the years. Iyall has continued to pursue music as a side project. Iyall has garnered acclaim as a skilled lyricist who explores themes like sexuality and alienation from a female perspective with "searing imagery".

== History ==
=== 1979: Formation ===
Romeo Void formed at the San Francisco Art Institute in February 1979. Vocalist Debora Iyall occasionally visited the Bay Area to see Patti Smith perform. She decided to pursue an art education after reading a fortune cookie. "It was in the late '70s at the Indochina Friendship Booth at the annual Fourth of July streetfair in Eureka, California," she said. "I got a fortune cookie that said 'Art is your fate, don't debate.' That next January, I was enrolled in an art school in San Francisco." She began frequenting the Mabuhay Gardens, a popular nightclub, to see local alternative rock groups like The Nuns, the Mutants, Crime, and the Avengers. She also formed the Mummers and Poppers, a punk parody band that covered 1960s tunes with guitarist Peter Woods, Charles Hagan and drummer Jay Derrah, . Iyall was originally hesitant to perform because she was overweight: "After seeing Patti Smith, I still had it in my mind that you had to be skinny to be up there [on stage], but after going to the Mabuhay [...] you just do whatever you want, be whoever you want, just make it happen."

Bassist Frank Zincavage met Iyall at the SF Art Institute; the two hit it off and discussed putting a band together. They formed one with Woods and Derrah a few weeks later, drawing inspiration from the "burgeoning local punk and post-punk scenes". Iyall recruited Woods because she enjoyed playing with him in the Mummers and Poppers. "[It] seemed only natural that we invite Peter Woods to join us [... He] played clean and was a natural on rhythm guitar." Romeo Void officially formed on Valentine's Day in 1979. According to Iyall, the name Romeo Void referred to "a lack of romance" and came to mind after they saw a local magazine with the headline "Why single women can't get laid in San Francisco." The name "means there are not romantic notions here — and there shouldn't be," Iyall told an interviewer: "We are about reality, not the myths created by other artists."

The band practiced in Iyall's flat in the Mission District. It was decided that the group would embrace punk ideals despite the possibility that they become associated with the new wave movement. "Even though I was going to the [Mabuhay Gardens] so much, I also had criticisms: Everyone was leaning against the wall wearing black," Iyall said. "I guess we were considered new wave, but for me Romeo Void was a reaction against the regimentation of everyone having to be bleached blond and everything being about despair and no future, when I thought the do-it-yourself thing should encompass all the different kinds of emotions, and all the different colors. [...] I was proud of being American Indian, so I purposely never bleached my hair blond."

=== 1980–1982: It's a Condition, Benefactor, and mainstream success ===
The band became busy playing shows at clubs and warehouses around San Francisco, and quickly became popular. Saxophonist Benjamin Bossi was added to the lineup as an "accident" when Iyall met him while he worked in the New York City Deli on Market Street in San Francisco. The group released their first single, "White Sweater", which consisted of the title track and a cover of Jerry Lordan's popular instrumental composition "Apache", in February 1981 on a recently founded local label called 415 Records. They worked on the recording of their debut album, It's a Condition, with producer David Kahne. Before recording began, Derrah left the band and was replaced by John "Stench" Hanes, who had previously played with Pearl Harbor and the Explosions. Romeo Void's debut was critically acclaimed upon its release through 415 in July 1981, and introduced Romeo Void's "unique blend of jazz, funk, rock and confrontational poetry". AllMusic writer Stewart Mason later heralded it as one of the "masterpieces of American post-punk". Indie labels were enthusiastic with promotions and the band embarked on several nationwide tours. Eventually Hanes left the band, leaving Larry Carter to fill the drummer position.

The sudden surge in popularity was disorienting to Iyall. "It was frightening: we played a college in Santa Barbara, and there were all these blond people crowding the stage, and I thought 'These are the people who hated me in high school!' When you grow up being 'outside' – because I wasn't white, and I was fat, and always a bit of a free thinker – it was strange. It was like, 'uh-oh, I must be doing something wrong – they like me!'" Highly successful mainstream artists like Ann Wilson and Ric Ocasek were eager to meet the band. Ocasek extended an invitation to collaborate at his Syncro Sound recording studio in Boston. The recording sessions in Boston resulted in the Never Say Never EP in January 1982. The title track became (arguably) their best-known song and has remained synonymous with the band ever since. The song was also featured in the 1984 romantic teen drama Reckless. Additionally, the success of the single directly led to 415 Records signing a deal with Columbia Records, which elevated the indie label's roster to major-label status. Romeo Void released their second album, entitled Benefactor, in November 1982. The album appeared at No. 119 on the Billboard 200. Benefactor was noticeably more commercial sounding than previous endeavors; the music was made more danceable and swearing was removed on the song "Never Say Never". The different approach in the sound resulted in comparisons to Blondie, which AllMusic writer William Ruhlmann suggested was a deliberate attempt by Columbia. Iyall stated that there was more pressure to write sexually laced lyrics for Benefactor: "I do like to be provocative, and I definitely have access to my sexuality, and as a topic I find it ripe, but I wasn't ever going to be a sex-pot diva, so that was kind of odd." She also said there was pressure to produce more singles.

=== 1983–present: Instincts, break-up, and post-band endeavors ===
A third and final album was again helmed by David Kahne, which AllMusic writer Stewart Mason speculated was a "reaction against the more commercial sound of Benefactor. By this time, Carter had been replaced by veteran session drummer Aaron Smith. Instincts was released in October 1984, debuted at No. 68 on the Billboard 200, and proved to be the band's best-selling album. It also launched their most successful single, "A Girl in Trouble (Is a Temporary Thing)," which broke the Billboard Top 40 and peaked at No. 35. Critical reactions were positive. Despite being the band's most successful effort to date, Columbia pulled the band's promotional support while on a nationwide tour. "The very next town we got to after they made that decision, there wasn't an A&R person there," said Iyall. "[There] was no local person there, there were no interviews and in-stores arranged as they had been. All that just ground to a halt." The band returned to San Francisco and soon broke up. Constant touring has been cited by Iyall as the primary reason for the break-up. "You get tired of each other, and you get intolerant of being uncomfortable and away from your family and your friends." According to a VH1 reunion episode, the issue of Iyall's weight was the reason for the label dropping them. In 2003, Iyall agreed with this claim: "Howie sold us from 415 to Columbia Records, and they were like 'Who's this fat chick?' They decided that was as far as it was going to get, and pulled their support." Crawdaddy! writer Denise Sullivan stated that the label spoke to Iyall about losing weight, but she subsequently refused. In 2010, Iyall declined to discuss the issue, but added that she may not be taking full responsibility in the matter.

Iyall released a solo album entitled Strange Language with former band members Bossi and Smith in 1986. Afterward she pursued a career as an art teacher. The band reunited briefly for a live performance in 1993. In 2004, Romeo Void was featured on an episode of VH1's Bands Reunited. Bossi had sustained too much hearing damage over the years and was unable to perform, although he did meet up with the band again and watched the reunion performance from an adjacent room. Iyall has continued to dabble in music related projects and events. "I still like to sing and I still like to perform," she said. In 2003 she was involved in a musical project called Knife in Water. She began collaborating with Peter Dunne, who was known as Peter Bilt when he played guitar for Pearl Harbor and the Explosions. Iyall and Dunne performed at a support benefit for Crawdaddy! founder Paul Williams in June 2009, and performed at a concert honoring 415 Records later that September. They released an album entitled Stay Strong in 2010.

Drummer Larry Carter died in August of 2021, from what is thought to be heart complications. Saxophonist Benjamin Bossi died of complications from Alzheimer's disease on December 13, 2022, at the age of 69.

== Music ==
"Never Say Never"
The band's most popular song, "Never Say Never" exhibits a "sexy yet sneering and detached essence" in what has been hailed one of the greatest lines in rock history: "I might like you better if we slept together".

"A Girl In Trouble (Is A Temporary Thing)"
"A Girl In Trouble (Is A Temporary Thing)" was the group's highest-charting single. AllMusic called it "a smart, sexy, and spellbinding slice from one of the best and most creative and overlooked artists of the mid-'80s."

Romeo Void has generally been classified as a new wave or post-punk band. Some critics have noted dance elements in the music. According to Stewart Mason, writing for AllMusic, "[The] band's muscular blend of Joy Division's atmospherics and the Gang of Four's rattling momentum, with Benjamin Bossi's splattering free jazz saxophone coloring everything, made Romeo Void one of the strongest of the American post-punk bands. The St. Petersburg Times wrote that they "had no trouble creating a signature sound for [themselves with a] scratchy guitar, soulful sax, [and] tight, precise drums." The New York Times stated that they sounded like "an art-school band, with its textural complexity [and] touches of jazz and funk" Saxophone player Benjamin Bossi has been observed as the ingredient that "set the band apart" and showed a "talent for both improvisation and arrangement." Alan Niester, writing for The Globe and Mail, said that he weaved "in and out [...] like a snake charmer" and reminded him of Andy Mackay, a saxophonist who played with Roxy Music.

Liam Lacey, also writing for The Globe and Mail, described Iyall's voice as "sultry [and] sexy", while Mason called it "powerful". Her style has sometimes been compared to Chrissie Hynde, vocalist for the Pretenders. Richard Harrington of The Washington Post acknowledged the similarity, but also noted the influence of other singers in "Never Say Never" where Iyall mixed the "aggressive bitchiness of [Hynde], the coy confrontational tactics of Patty Donahue of the Waitresses and the slack sensuality of Debbie Harry of the earliest Blondie." Iyall used to find the comparison annoying, but eventually warmed to it: "When people said I sounded like her, I'd say, 'Oh yeah, thanks a lot.' But this year, I've fallen in love with Learning To Crawl so now I don't care if people want to make comparisons." After a live show in 1982, Niester contended that she was the weakest part of the group and had the "vocal range of an automobile horn". Billboard writer Kathy Gillis wrote after a concert two years later that Iyall exhibited a "dramatic range that, while not extreme in either direction, was touching."

Patti Smith had a great influence on Iyall. "[She was] someone who was both a rock singer and a poet," she said. "She combined things I was interested in. Plus, she wasn't a trumped-up sex symbol. She was herself on stage. That appealed to me. It looked like something I could do. You didn't have to look like all the other singers." Iyall was highly critical of the music of the day and found inspiration in other mediums. "I hate rock and roll right now. It's turned into some new kind of stupid religion... I'd rather listen to Billie Holiday, maybe Tom Waits. Actually, I'll admit I like The Bangles – they have a great sound. But I'd just as soon read novels or paint pictures as listen to music. I love language – plain speech, used in an enigmatic, subliminal way; I'm not much tied to the literal."

== Lyrics ==
Iyall was observed by Mother Jones to be among a new group of female-fronted rock bands that displayed a "tough, wry, street-wise, [and] cynical" attitude and sought to redefine the role of women in rock music. She developed a sizable following for her writing that covered topics like "frustrated desire [and] sexually motivated rage" from a female perspective. Critics praised her lyrics for their "searing imagery", "seething poetics", and "darkly intelligent lyrics" "My approach was always that I had something to say, I had a point of view," Iyall said, commenting on her outspokeness. "I remember seeing Penelope from the Avengers at the Mabuhay Gardens and thinking, I can do that. I have something to say."

Romeo Void's best known song is "Never Say Never", which contains the famous line "I might like you better if we slept together." AllMusic writer Heather Phares has argued that Iyall's "teasing, existential musings [...] predated and predicted the aloof yet frank sexuality of early- and mid-'90s artists such as Elastica and Liz Phair". Phares concluded that the song was "a subversive, influential classic" and "one of new wave's most distinctive and innovative moments. " The song has been covered by many artists, among them are Queens of the Stone Age, Amanda Blank and Xiu Xiu. The song "A Girl in Trouble (Is a Temporary Thing)", their highest-charting single, was reportedly written as a response to Michael Jackson's hit song "Billie Jean", but can also be seen as a tribute to women who have experienced traumatizing events. Iyall also wrote songs that touched on themes like social alienation ("Undercover Kept") and generation gaps ("Chinatown").

== Band members ==
Classic line-up

- Debora Iyall – vocals (1979–1985, 1993, 2004)
- Peter Woods – guitar (1979–1985, 1993, 2004)
- Frank Zincavage – bass (1979–1985, 1993, 2004)
- Benjamin Bossi – saxophone (1980–1985, 1993; died 2022)
- Aaron Smith – drums, percussion (1984–1985, 1993, 2004)

Previous members

- Jay Derrah – drums, percussion (1979–1981)
- John "Stench" Hanes – drums, percussion (1981)
- Larry Carter – drums, percussion (1981–1984; died 2021)

Live musician

- Sheldon Brown – saxophone (2004)

== Discography ==
=== Albums ===
==== Studio albums ====
Title	Album details	Peak chart positions		
Title	Album details	US	CAN	NZ
It's a Condition	Released: July 1981; Label: 415; Formats: LP, MC	—	—	46
Benefactor	Released: 1982; Label: Columbia/415; Formats: LP, MC	119	91	—
Instincts	Released: October 1, 1984; Label: Columbia/415; Formats: LP, MC	68	—	—
"—" denotes releases that did not chart or were not released in that territory.

==== Compilation albums ====
Title	Album details
Warm, in Your Coat	Released: 5 May 1992; Label: Columbia/Legacy; Formats: CD, MC
A Girl in Trouble (Is a Temporary Thing)	Released: 8 August 2006; Label: Collectables/Sony BMG; Formats: CD
Never Say Never: Hits, Rarities & Gems	Released: 19 September 2006; Label: Sony BMG; Formats: CD

=== EPs ===
Title	Album details	Peak chart positions	
Title	Album details	US	NZ
Never Say Never	Released: December 1981; Label: Columbia/415; Formats: 12", MC	147	18
"—" denotes releases that did not chart or were not released in that territory.

=== Singles ===
Title	Year	Peak chart positions						Album
Title	Year	US	US Dance	US Main	AUS	CAN	NZ	Album
"White Sweater"	1981	—	31 (Note: "White Sweater" charted on the Dance Club Songs chart as a cut from the It's a Condition album alongside "Myself to Myself" and "Talk Dirty (to Me)".)	—	—	—	—	It's a Condition
"Never Say Never"	1982	—	17	27	—	—	—	Benefactor
"A Girl in Trouble (Is a Temporary Thing)"	1984	35	11	17	74	76	27	Instincts
"Say No"	1984	—	—	—	—	—	—	Instincts
"—" denotes releases that did not chart or were not released in that territory.
