= A Girl in Trouble (Is a Temporary Thing) =

Single by Romeo Void

from the album Instincts
- Released: 1984
- Recorded: 1984
- Genre: New wave; sophisti-pop
- Length: 4:17 (album version); 3:48 (single version)
- Label: Columbia
- Songwriters: Debora Iyall; Peter Woods; Frank Zincavage; David Kahne
- Producer: David Kahne

Romeo Void singles chronology
"Never Say Never" (1982)	"A Girl in Trouble (Is a Temporary Thing)" (1984)	"Say No" (1984)

"A Girl in Trouble (Is a Temporary Thing)" is a song by Romeo Void released in 1984, from the Columbia album Instincts. It was the band's biggest hit and their only ever top 40 hit single, peaking at number 35 on the Billboard Hot 100.

A music video was also made for the song, which included themes of paint, social commentary, body image, art, and stop motion animation. It got some MTV airplay.

== Track listings ==
7-inch

1. "A Girl in Trouble (Is a Temporary Thing)"
2. "Going to Neon"

12-inch

1. "A Girl in Trouble (Is a Temporary Thing)" (dance mix)
2. "Six Days and One"

== Charts ==
Chart (1984–1985)	Peak position
Australia (Kent Music Report)	74
US Billboard Hot 100	35
US Billboard Top Rock Tracks	17
US Billboard Hot Dance Music/Club Play	11
