= Vulcan Mountain =

Mountain in state of Washington, United States

Vulcan Mountain is a 5,256-foot (1,602 m) peak in Ferry County, Washington, United States. Located about one kilometer south of the Canada–United States border, it was named by prospectors for the presence of iron ore in the vicinity.

Vulcan Mountain once had a fire lookout. The Gold Dike Mine (48.9792°N 118.5583°W) was operated by Vulcan Mountain Inc. in the 1980s on the mountain's eastern flank, extracting gold and silver.
