= Never Say Never (Romeo Void song) =

Single by Romeo Void

from the album Benefactor
- Released: November 1982
- Genre: Post-punk; new wave; dance-rock; disco-punk
- Length: 3:26 (album and 7" version); 6:06 (EP and 12" version)
- Label: Columbia
- Songwriters: Debora Iyall; Peter Woods; Frank Zincavage; Benjamin Bossi; Larry Carter
- Producers: Ric Ocasek; Ian Taylor

Romeo Void singles chronology
"White Sweater" (1981)	"Never Say Never" (1982)	"A Girl in Trouble (Is a Temporary Thing)" (1984)

Audio sample
- file; help

"Never Say Never" is a 1982 song by the new wave band Romeo Void. One of their best-known songs, "Never Say Never" was a favorite on early MTV, featuring a black-and-white music video that spoofs Jean-Luc Godard's Breathless. The song is driven by a throbbing, funky bassline and punctuated by jagged guitar and saxophone, incorporating post-punk influences. The song reached #17 on the Billboard Dance / Disco chart on the 27th of March 1982.

Originally released on an EP through 415 Records, "Never Say Never" was re-recorded for the band's second album and major label debut, Benefactor. The album version is more radio friendly, cutting the song's length almost in half and removing expletives.

== Composition ==
Musically, the song has been described as post-punk, new wave, dance-rock, and disco-punk.

== Track listing ==
7" single
No.	Title	Length
1.	"Never Say Never"	3:26
2.	"Flashflood"	4:56

== Personnel ==
- Debora Iyall – vocals
- Peter Woods – guitar
- Benjamin Bossi – saxophone
- Frank Zincavage – bass
- Larry Carter – drums, percussion

== Chart positions ==
Chart (1982)	Peak position
US Billboard Dance Club Songs	17
US Billboard Top Tracks	27

== Never Say Never (EP) ==
Never Say Never

EP by Romeo Void
- Released: December 1981
- Recorded: October 1981
- Genre: New wave
- Length: 20:23
- Label: 415
- Producers: Ian Taylor; Ric Ocasek

Romeo Void chronology
It's a Condition (1981)	Never Say Never (1981)	Benefactor (1982)

Professional ratings
Review scores
Source	Rating
AllMusic	4.5/5 stars
Robert Christgau	B+

Never Say Never is an EP by American new wave band Romeo Void, released in 1981. It was released on CD in 2006 by Wounded Bird Records, as four bonus tracks to their reissue of Benefactor.

=== Track listing ===
All tracks by Debora Iyall, Peter Woods, Frank Zincavage, Benjamin Bossi and Larry Carter.

1. "Never Say Never" – 6:06
2. "In the Dark" – 4:33
3. "Present Tense" – 5:47
4. "Not Safe" – 3:57

== Appearances in media ==
The song was featured in the 1984 film Reckless starring Aidan Quinn as a football star and renegade. Quinn's character takes over the school dance's DJ booth to play the single, much to the dismay of all his classmates. A dance sequence ensues with Quinn's character moshing about while a somewhat distraught Daryl Hannah tries to figure out how to dance with him.

A small segment of the song was featured in a scene of the film Dodgeball: A True Underdog Story. It also was included in the 2013 film The Wolf of Wall Street. In 2016, it was featured in the show Ash vs Evil Dead during a scene of the season two episode Trapped Inside.

The song was also featured in Grand Theft Auto: Vice City. It is heard in the game on the radio station Wave 103.

== Covers ==
- In 2000 by Queens of the Stone Age, as a bonus track on the album Rated R. This cover was also featured on the soundtrack for the film The Punisher (2004).
- In 2009, the band Julien-K covered "Never Say Never" on their debut album Death to Analog, stylizing the song title as "Nvr Say Nvr".
