= Debora Iyall =

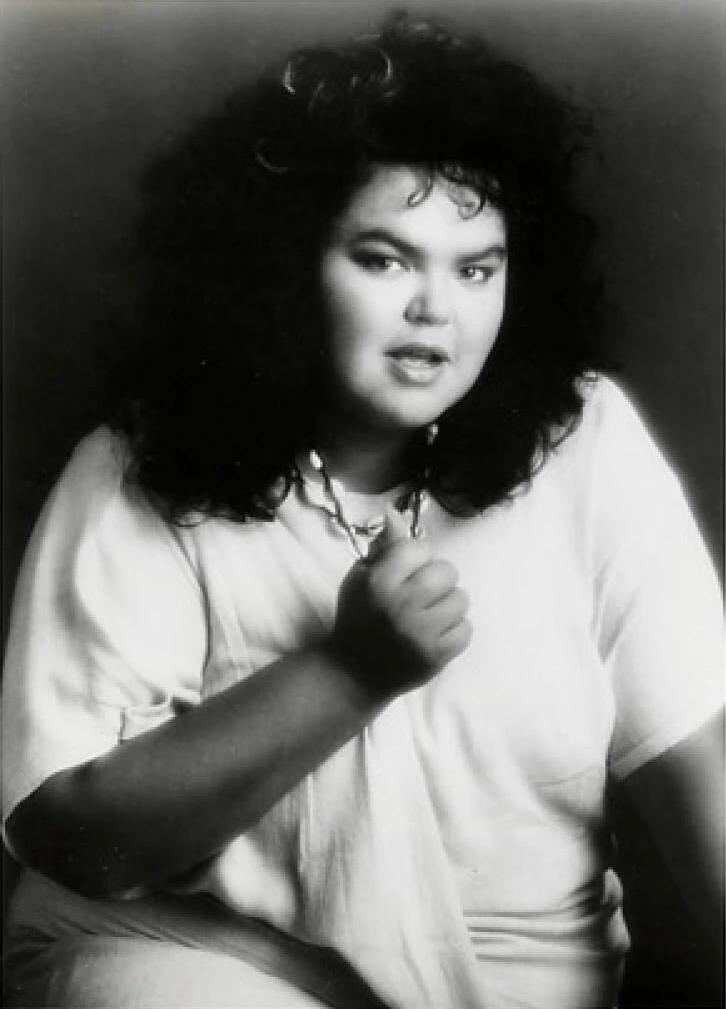
- Iyall in 1985

Background information
- Born: Debora Kay Iyall; 29 April 1954 (age 72); Soap Lake, Washington, U.S.
- Origin: Cowlitz
- Genres: Punk rock; new wave; post-punk
- Occupations: Singer; artist; art instructor
- Years active: 1979–present

Debora Kay Iyall (/ˈaɪ.ɑːl/; Salishan pronunciation: [ˈʌɪalwahawa]; born 29 April 1954), is a Cowlitz artist and singer, known for her role as lead singer for the new wave band Romeo Void.

== Early life ==
Iyall was born in 1954 in Soap Lake, Washington, and grew up in Fresno, California. She is an enrolled member of the Cowlitz Indian Tribe. Iyall got her surname from her family adopting their ancestor Iyallwahawa's "first" name written at the time as Ayiel. In 1969, at age fourteen, Iyall joined the Occupation of Alcatraz and stayed for six days. She had hoped to connect with the Native American activist community there but felt "out of place".

== Romeo Void ==
While attending the San Francisco Art Institute, she joined Frank Zincavage and Peter Woods to create Romeo Void in 1979. The band was notable for their modernization of the punk sound, and for Iyall's forceful, half-spoken delivery. They reached hit status on college radio stations with the suggestive and multi-leveled song "Never Say Never" in 1982. Their song "A Girl in Trouble (Is a Temporary Thing)" landed them in the top 40 of Billboard's Hot 100 chart, and an appearance on Dick Clark's American Bandstand in 1984.

== Solo albums and art career ==
Romeo Void parted ways in 1985, and the following year Iyall released her debut solo album Strange Language on Columbia Records. After a lukewarm reception of the album, Iyall returned to her first love, as an artist and art instructor. Throughout the 1990s she taught art at the 29 Palms Cultural Center and for the Arts Council for San Bernardino. She also led hikes and made presentations for the Agua Caliente Cultural Museum as a paid docent, and in 1995 she started Ink Clan, a print shop dedicated to teaching screen printing and other arts to young Native artists. Ink Clan was once housed in the South of Market Cultural Center in San Francisco. She presently resides in New Mexico. She was married to audio engineer and instructor Patrick Haight, who died in 2025.

Since late 2009, Iyall has been performing new material written with Peter Dunne at a variety of local venues in Northern California. In 2010, Iyall's second solo album, Stay Strong, was released, and in January 2012, an EP, Singing Until Sunrise, was released. On 2 November 2019, Iyall was awarded as a Lifetime Achievement Honoree at the 19th Annual Native American Music Awards.

In 2023, Iyall appeared as the Great Cowlitz Sa'mn Spirit in the season 2 episode 6 "Salmon, Where Are You?" of the Netflix children's show Spirit Rangers.

== Discography ==
- Strange Language (1986)
- Stay Strong (2010)
- Singing Until Sunrise (2012)
