= 4-4-1 =

Christian rock band

- Origin: Arcadia, California, USA
- Genres: Range includes: Rock; Post-punk; Alternative rock Pop
- Years active: 1983–1993; 2005–present
- Labels: Blue Collar Records; Broken Records; Brainstorm Artists, Intl
- Members: John McNamara; Glenn Holland; John Giali; Steve Giali
- Past members: Marie McGilvray; Kenny Holland; John Covell; David Starr
- Website: www.441online.com

4-4-1 (also written as "441") are an alternative-pop Christian rock band who played primarily in the 1980s. 4-4-1 consisted of lead singer/guitarist John McNamara, drummer Steve Giali, lead guitarist John Giali and bassist/keyboardist Glenn Holland.

== History ==
=== Formation and breakthrough ===
Formed in 1983, 4-4-1 discovered their blend of catchy beats and melodies capped with insightful lyrics in Glenn's parents' garage in Arcadia, California, the hometown of all four members.

The band recorded their first demo tape of four songs (Judgment Game, Love's Irony, Mom & Dad and Break Out) in the garage and sent it to youth pastors around southern California. Randy Ziegler, who ran the very popular concert series at Calvary Chapel Costa Mesa, responded with enthusiasm and immediately met with the band and set in motion high-profile concerts as well as discussions with record labels.

4-4-1's first performances were as an opening act for a standing-room-only shows for Benny Hester and Undercover and the band was met with great enthusiasm from the crowds.

The band completed their first record at Doug Doyle's 3-D Studios under the new label Royal Commandment (later to be named Blue Collar Records) and released it in early November 1984. Both the song “Break Out” and the self-titled album debuted at the top position on so-cal CCM radio station KYMS, a first for any act and topping the hugely successful new release by U2, “The Unforgettable Fire” and their legendary hit “Pride (In the Name of Love).”

“4-4-1” stayed in the top 40 for several months and the band was named 1984's “Best New Band” in the KYMS listener music awards.

=== National exposure ===
The band completed their second album, Mourning Into Dancing in the summer of 1985. Produced by Dino and John Elefante of Kansas fame, the disc showed a more mature sound and consistently stronger songwriting.

Joined by groups Undercover and Adam Again, the newly renamed Blue Collar Records aggressively promoted their trifecta of bands and “Mourning Into Dancing” debuted on the CCM Magazine top 40 sales chart and the title track rose to number two on the national rock charts.

4-4-1 toured extensively off the success of their two hit records, playing energetic sets at the Icthus and Cornerstone festivals in 1986.

Blue Collar Records declared bankruptcy in 1987 based on non-payment of record sales from its distributor, leaving the band (as well as Undercover and Adam Again) looking for a home.

=== Breakup ===
With the failure of their label and new priorities for several of the members, 4-4-1 consequently chose to end their run as a group in mid-1987. 4-4-1 played their last concert at Knott's Berry Farm on May 1, 1987.

=== Sacrifice ===
John McNamara and Glenn Holland, the songwriters for the band, continued writing. At the same time, Ojo Taylor (Undercover) and Gene Eugene (Adam Again) were reviving Maranantha!’s Broken Records and with it, production company Brainstorm Artists International. Subsequently, the duo came to agreement with Broken for a third 4-4-1 album, with the other two members’ blessing to use the name of the band.

“Sacrifice,” was released on Broken Records/ Brainstorm Artists International and distributed by Word Records in 1988. Produced with Gene Eugene, the project was a departure, with a more introspective and moody feel, largely based on the duo's strange experiences in the world of Christian music.

The “new” 4-4-1 toured the region on a limited basis in promotion of the record, with Glenn's brother Kenny Holland on drums (Kenny had played on the studio tracks) and John Gaudesi, Kenny's bandmate from the L.A.-based hard rock outfit, Cats & Dogs, on guitar.

With family commitments looming, Holland and McNamara decided to stop pursuing a musical path so aggressively. Subsequently, 4-4-1 “proper” reformed in the early 1990s for several concerts, including a New Year's Eve performance with The 77s at Calvary Chapel West Covina in 1992. The band performed their last gig on July 4, 1993.

== Reunion ==
In 2005, after a long period of inactivity, the group once again began to play some concerts in southern California, including the Broken Reunion show on August 19, 2005 with Undercover, The Choir, The Altar Boys and Crumbächer. 4-4-1 also played the Spirit West Coast festival in Del Mar, California in May, 2006. As of November 2006, the band is working on new material for a possible album project in 2007. A week before their breakout reunion in 2005, Bassist Glenn Holland was diagnosed with cancer. This album relives the tough times that the band was dealing with through their hits such as "Break Out", "Mourning Into Dancing" and the heartfelt "Is It Enough". They performed in a concert at Mission Hills Church in Orange County, California on March 28, 2009. They played with up and coming band, Sun From Shadows.

== Discography ==
- 441, 1984
- Mourning Into Dancing, 1985
- Sacrifice, 1988
- Broken Reunion, 2009
