= LP (Insomniac Folklore album) =

Studio album by Insomniac Folklore
- Released: May 13, 2010
- Recorded: Fall/Winter 2009
- Genres: Gypsy punk, indie folk, alternative rock
- Length: 50:45
- Label: Art vs Product
- Producers: Tyler Hentschel, Mike Alston & Insomniac Folklore

Insomniac Folklore chronology
| Oh Well (2007) | LP (2010) | A Place Where Runaways Are Not Alone (2011) |

Singles from Insomniac Folklore
- 1. "LP" Released: June 13, 2010; 2. "Man Hands" Released: September 13, 2010

LP is the fifth studio album by American indie-folk, gypsy-punk group Insomniac Folklore. It was recorded by Mike Alston at Sound Ghost Studios in Portland, Oregon, during the fall and winter of 2009. Additional songs were recorded at PMC by Tyler Hentschel.

The album art was created by gothic comic book artist Foo Swee Chin.

Bradley Hathaway guested with the band doing spoken word on the opening track "Kid and Snail".

Grace Notes described LP as "Likable indie folk with subtle punk roots and clever songwriting"

== Track listing ==
All tracks are written by Tyler Hentschel.

| No. | Title | Length |
|---|---|---|
| 1. | "Kid and Snail" | 1:32 |
| 2. | "LP" | 3:59 |
| 3. | "The Lego Song" | 4:31 |
| 4. | "Gray Cars" | 4:34 |
| 5. | "Kill A Baby Save A Tree" | 1:10 |
| 6. | "Kids" | 4:11 |
| 7. | "Intermission" | 2:19 |
| 8. | "I'm Sorry" | 4:24 |
| 9. | "Man Hands" | 3:02 |
| 10. | "Cellphones Give You Brain Cancer" | 0:15 |
| 11. | "Photographic Evidence of a Normal Life" | 5:28 |
| 12. | "Wholly Holy" | 6:09 |
| 13. | "A Thousand Cliches" | 9:13 |

== Personnel ==
Insomniac Folklore

- Tyler Hentschel – Vocals, guitar, organ, lyricist, composer, songwriter
- John David Van Beek – Accordion
- Danielle Maes – Violin
- Ayden Simonatti – Drums
- Dennis Childers – Bass
- Zoe Simonatti – Backing vocals
- Anavah Simonatti – backing vocals

Additional personnel

- Bradley Hathaway – Spoken word
- Kat Jones – Vocals
- Ricardo Alessio – Ironing board
- Jason Maes – Trumpet
