= A Place Where Runaways Are Not Alone =

Studio album by Insomniac Folklore
- Released: May 13, 2011
- Recorded: Winter 2010
- Genres: Gypsy punk, indie folk, alternative rock
- Length: 40:09
- Label: BD Recs
- Producer: Tyler Hentschel

Insomniac Folklore chronology
| LP (2010) | A Place Where Runaways Are Not Alone (2011) | Sleep in Your Car (2014) |

Singles from Insomniac Folklore
- 1. "Useless" Released: June 13, 2011

Professional ratings
Review scores
| Source | Rating |
|---|---|
| Phantom Tollbooth | 4.5/5 stars |
| Alpha Omega News | (B+) |

A Place Where Runaways Are Not Alone is the sixth studio album by American indie-folk, gypsy-punk group Insomniac Folklore. It was recorded by band leader Tyler Hentschel while in St Louis, Missouri at a friends recording studio and released on May 13, 2011 on BD Recs, an independent label based out of St Louis. The albums drums were tracked out of Viking Camel Studio in Pennsylvania. Other parts were recorded remotely in Portland and Scotland and later mixed in St Louis. in The album artwork shows a girl facing a circus ten with a cross on top. Art and layout was created by Tyler Hentschel.

On Insomniac Folklore's website Hentschel says; "We were not expecting to make this album. Really it came out of nowhere. The plan was to follow up last year's L.P. by starting production on our violent and beautiful concept album Hands, Lips & Eyes but somewhere along the way things went wonderfully wrong." Then talks about what to do with these new songs "One night I was racking my brain about the direction of this project and Adrienne threw a couple of ridiculous seeming ideas my direction. We laughed about the ideas for a bit but then I thought about it... A church that is a circus. Tongue in cheek meets serious. No, This is the direction this album needs to go... I ran with it."

Daniel Otto Jack Petersen of the horror punk Group Blaster the Rocket Man, wrote and performed spoken word on "For Certain Serpent Servants" and "World Without End."

== Track listing ==
All tracks are written by Tyler Hentschel except for track 7 & 13 by Daniel Otto Jack Petersen with music by Insomniac Folklore and Track 9 by Harry Dixon Loes.

| No. | Title | Length |
|---|---|---|
| 1. | "Runaways and Dreamers, Freaks and Misfits, Welcome" | 1:58 |
| 2. | "Useless" | 2:36 |
| 3. | "Ran Away" | 2:22 |
| 4. | "Sleep in Your Car" | 3:39 |
| 5. | "Beautiful" | 3:12 |
| 6. | "Thirsty Eye" | 2:58 |
| 7. | "For Certain Serpent Servants" | 2:43 |
| 8. | "In Me" | 5:51 |
| 9. | "This Little Light of Mine" | 1:40 |
| 10. | "Bodies And Arson" | 3:01 |
| 11. | "Light of the World" | 1:59 |
| 12. | "Earplugs" | 5:31 |
| 13. | "World without End" | 2:43 |

== Personnel ==
Insomniac Folklore

- Tyler Hentschel – Vocals, Guitar, Organ, lyricist, composer, songwriter
- Amanda Curry – Bass, backing vocals
- Adrienne Michelle – Backing vocals, spoken word
- Lisa Barfield – Violin
- Joshua Hedlund – Accordion
- John David Van Beek – Accordion
- Danielle Maes – Violin, backing vocals
- Ayden Simonatti – Drums
- Dennis Childers – Bass

Additional personnel

- Daniel Otto Jack Petersen – Spoken word
- Kevin Schlereth – Drums
- Jessica, Kevin and Maddie Schlereth – Group vocals
