= Complete Music Update =

Music news service and website

Complete Music Update, originally called College Music Update, and better known as CMU or the CMU Daily, is a music news service and website aimed at people working in the UK music business and music media. It primarily provides news and information about the music business, music media and music world. It is now best known for its daily email newsletter, the CMU Daily. Its current editor is Andy Malt.

CMU is owned by UnLimited Media, which also publishes the Edinburgh Festival magazine ThreeWeeks.

== Launch and aims ==
CMU was co-founded by Chris Cooke, Alastair Walker and Fraser Thomson in 1998. It says its aim is "to bring together everyone working in music, from the suits at the biggest music, digital and media firms, to the people keeping it very real in the grass roots music community". In that regard CMU's target audience is probably much wider than other music industry trade magazines like Music Week or Billboard.

CMU was initially a printed magazine mailed for free to people working in the UK music industry, music media and college music community, with a complementary website. In 2002 the magazine was replaced with a daily e-newsletter, the CMU Daily.

CMU's news service covers new and established artists and labels from the pop, indie, rock, metal, EDM, jazz, hip hop, R&B and classical genres.

== CMU Daily ==
The CMU Daily is a daily newsletter that includes music business and music media news, as well as artist stories, tour dates and gossip from the music world. It is available for free to anyone working in music, who can read it on the CMU website or opt to receive it by email each day.

The CMU Daily is different from most other trade publications in that it also covers a lot of artist news and gossip, and it has more critical editorials and a more irreverent tone than most trade media.

The CMU Daily originally also included album and single reviews, though these were phased out and replaced by the CMU Approved column, which recommends new artists and music each day.

== CMU Insights and The Great Escape ==
CMU also runs a training and research programme called CMU Insights which provides training courses to the UK music business.

Since 2011, CMU Insights has also programmed the convention side of The Great Escape Festival, the showcase festival and music business conference that takes place in Brighton each May.

== Other outputs ==
In 2005 CMU launched a sister website aimed at music consumers, called The Beats Bar, though this has since been merged with the main CMU website.

From 2008 to 2012, CMU published a separate weekly newsletter also aimed at music consumers, called the CMU Weekly and later the Editor's Letter, which in someways replaced The Beats Bar. This included a digest of CMU news stories from the previous week and other features. Since Autumn 2012 these features have been merged into the CMU Daily and the main CMU website.

From 2003 to 2012, CMU published a separate weekly email newsletter called the Remix Update (later Eddy Says) for listeners of The Remix, a specialist show on UK alternative radio station Xfm. This was later replaced by a regular column on the CMU website, written by The Remix presenter Eddy Temple-Morris and also called Eddy Says.

== Content syndication ==
A number of other music websites syndicate or have syndicated stories from the CMU Daily, including R&R World, Music Rooms, Rivvmix and Audio Scribbler. The UK edition of the Epoch Times also once included a column featuring CMU news stories.

== The CMU Social ==
For a number of years CMU was the main media partner of events staged by Leyline Promotions, including Remix Night and Twisted Licks. Through this partnership, in 2008 CMU and Leyline ran a club night called the CMU Social at London venue 229.

Bands to play at the club during its 2008 programme included City Reverb, Rose Elinor Dougall, Matt Finucane, Tim Ten Yen, Post War Years, Model Horror, The Deer Tracks, Maths Class, Vessels, Infadels, Restlesslist, A.Human, The Penny Black Remedy, Big Strides and Sportsday Megaphone.
