= CCM Magazine =

Contemporary Christian music online magazine

- Categories: Music magazine
- Frequency: Daily
- Founded: 1978
- First issue: July 1978
- Company: Logan and Amanda Sekulow
- Country: United States
- Based in: Nashville, Tennessee
- Language: English
- Website: ccmmagazine.com
- ISSN: 1524-7848

CCM Magazine is an online magazine focusing on contemporary Christian music and media, published by Logan and Amanda Sekulow.

== History ==
CCM was first published in July 1978, as a printed magazine. It has been owned by Salem since 1999. On January 16, 2008, Salem announced that the April 2008 issue would be the final printed issue of the magazine, which would continue in an online-only format.

When the magazine was first published, it was called Contemporary Christian Music and covered that music genre. The name was later shortened to CCM, which was still an acronym for "Contemporary Christian Music". For a short time, the magazine changed its name to Contemporary Christian Magazine (keeping the "CCM" but broadening the scope) but then ultimately went back to Contemporary Christian Music (CCM). Then in May 2007, the name's meaning was changed to "Christ. Community. Music." The editor explained that the term "contemporary Christian music" was dated and marginalizing and that Christ, community, and music are three entirely different things — thus, the periods after each word of the acronym to show that they are not related. The editor's explanation of the name change can be found in the May 2007 issue of the magazine.

In October 2006, CCM launched its own social networking site, MyCCM.

Since its start, CCM has covered mainstream musical artists that mix spiritual themes with their music, including Bob Dylan, Johnny Cash, T Bone Burnett, Victoria Williams, The Call, Sam Phillips, U2 and Bruce Cockburn, as well as more mainstream Christian radio artists such as Amy Grant, Larry Norman, Michael W. Smith, Steven Curtis Chapman, Benny Hester, Steve Taylor, Phil Keaggy and Randy Stonehill. In the 1980s, CCM also focused on some of the more obscure spiritual artists coming out of the Southern California punk rock and new wave music scene like the 77s, Daniel Amos, Undercover, Altar Boys, Crumbächer, the Choir, Adam Again, and others. However, as the 1990s rolled around, the magazine focused more and more on artists that were heavily played on Christian radio.

In February 2025, CCM Magazine announced its purchase by Logan and Amanda Sekulow, media producers unaffiliated with Salem Media Group.

== Online publication ==
On July 8, 2009, Salem announced that CCM Magazine will be re-launched as an online publication, released four times a year. The magazine is updated daily on ccmmagazine.com and social media platforms.

== The CCM Update ==
In 1983, CCM Magazine spun off its contemporary Christian music industry analysis and charts into a new publication, The CCM Update (originally known as MusicLine and later MusicLine Update). While the new magazine focused on the contemporary Christian music industry-related content that was previously included in CCM Magazine, CCM Magazine retained the consumer-related content. The CCM Update published charts until its closure. At the time of its closure, the magazine published Christian album charts as well as four radio charts: adult contemporary, Christian hit radio/Pop, Inspirational/Praise, and Rock. It had previously published a Christian country radio chart as well as southern gospel, black gospel, and metal charts.

The CCM Update folded on April 15, 2002, with its feature content being incorporated into a full-page column in Radio & Records, also called The CCM Update. It also stopped publishing charts, leaving Radio & Records as the major chart publisher in the Christian music industry; according to James Cumbee, the president of Salem Communications, they felt that continuing to publish charts was a conflict of interest, as Salem owned many of the radio stations that reported to the charts.
