= Riki Michele =

American musician

Riki Michele (born Michele Bunch, currently Michele Palmer) started her musical career as a female Christian alternative rock artist. Best known as one of the vocalists for Adam Again, she has also recorded four eclectic solo albums.

A reviewer for Knight Ridder describer her as a "funky diva... a diva in the "female artist who knows what the heck she's doing" sense."

She was married to Gene Eugene, and though they divorced in 1994 she continued to record with him until his death in 2000.

== Discography ==
=== With Adam Again ===
- In a New World of Time (1986)
- Ten Songs by Adam Again (1988)
- Homeboys (1990)
- Dig (1992)
- Perfecta (1995)
- Worldwide Favourites (1999)
- A Tribute to Gene Eugene (2000)
- Adam Again Tribute Boxed Set (2001)

=== Solo ===
- Big Big Town (1989 – Broken Records)
- One Moment Please (1993 – WAL)
- Surround Me (2002 – independent)
- Come Let Us Adore Him: A Parable Christmas (2003 – Parable Christian Stores)
- Push (2015 – independent)

=== Compilations ===
- Liberation Sessions #1 (2000 – independent) A collection of 13 tracks from Michele's first two albums with some unreleased live and alternative mixes of songs from her third album.
- Making God Smile: An Artists' Tribute to the Songs of Beach Boy Brian Wilson – "Don't Talk (Put Your Head on My Shoulder)" (2002)
- Suffer the Children (2002 – compilation memorial with Theo Obrastoff)
