= Disasteroid =

Studio album by Blaster the Rocketboy
- Released: 1995
- Genre: Christian horror punk
- Length: 50:47

Blaster the Rocketboy chronology
Disasteroid (1995)	Succulent Space Food for Teething Vampires (1997)

Disasteroid is the debut studio album of the Indianapolis Christian horror punk band Blaster the Rocketboy, released in 1995. The band went on to make Succulent Space Food for Teething Vampires in '97 before switching labels and becoming Blaster the Rocket Man, releasing one more album and a compilation under its new name.

== Track listing ==
No.	Title	Length
1.	"I'm Only Humanoid (Lost in Space)"	2:06
2.	"King of the Beach"	2:01
3.	"I Killed the Checkout Girl (the Other Day)"	2:01
4.	"Vac-U-Suck"	2:01
5.	"Wolverine"	2:38
6.	"Hounds o' Hell"	2:09
7.	"Creature F"	3:06
8.	"Lucky Dog"	1:57
9.	"Gimmie a Fright"	1:12
10.	"100 M.P.H Tape"	1:11
11.	"Casio Polka"	0:30
12.	"Flesheaters"	2:56
13.	"Rapeworm (#1 hit radio single)"	3:41
14.	"Good Citizen"	4:22
15.	"The First in a Long Line of "Cute" Robots (7" version)"	1:49
16.	"B.T.R.B. – The Early Years"	17:35

== Personnel ==
- Otto Rocket (Daniel Petersen) – vocals
- Chrissy Rocket – guitar
- Johnny Rocket – drums
- Mikey Rocket – bass
