= Broken Records (record label) =

American Christian rock record label

- Parent company: Calvary Chapel
- Founded: 1985
- Defunct: 1990s
- Status: Defunct
- Distributor: Maranatha! Music
- Genre: Christian rock
- Country of origin: U.S.

Broken Records was an American Christian rock record label founded in 1985. The label closed in the early 1990s.

Broken Records became an important label in the development of both the West Coast Christian alternative rock and Christian hip hop scenes. It focused primarily on modern rock, punk and new wave music.

Artists signed to Broken Records included: Level Heads, The Altar Boys, The Choir, Crumbächer, The 77s, 4-4-1, Riki Michele, Adam Again and Undercover.

After having difficulties with its distributor, the label was for a time run successfully as Brainstorm Artists International (by Ojo Taylor and Gene Eugene).

== Artists ==
- 4-4-1
- The 77s
- Adam Again
- The Altar Boys
- The Choir
- The Clergy (see also Yum Yum Children)
- Crumbächer
- J.C. and the Boyz
- Mercy
- Riki Michele
- S.F.C.
- Undercover
- Level Heads

== Albums ==
- Homeboys
- Sticks and Stones
- Ten Songs by Adam Again
- Voices in Shadows
