= Sleep in Your Car =

Sleep In Your Car

Live album by Insomniac Folklore
- Released: June 17, 2014
- Recorded: Summer 2013
- Genre: Folk Punk, indie folk, alternative rock
- Length: 35:53
- Label: Funn Folk Sounds, Art vs Product
- Producer: Eric Funn & Insomniac Folklore

Insomniac Folklore chronology
| A Place Where Runaways Are Not Alone (2011) | Sleep In Your Car (2014) | The Early Years (2014) |

Sleep In Your Car is a live field recording style album by American indie-folk group Insomniac Folklore. It was recorded onto a cassette tape by Eric Funn using a single microphone with no overdubs. The recording occurred while the band was on tour through Stroudsburg, Pennsylvania, in the summer of 2013.

Sleep In Your Car was first released digitally by Funn Folk Sounds, and soon after, it was released on cassette by Insomniac Folklore.

The Modern Folk was quoted saying that "this particular release documents an energetic performance" and further described Insomniac Folklore as "a driving guitars and drums three piece characterized by dead-pan Calvin Johnson (musician) -esque male vocals harmonized with sweeter female singing." They proceeded to talk about the field-style by saying that "the clipping, one mic cassette tape recording is perfect for the band's sound and the label's mission".

== Track listing ==
All tracks are written by Tyler Hentschel.

| No. | Title | Length |
|---|---|---|
| 1. | "Feet In The Earth" | 2:49 |
| 2. | "Man Hands" | 2:53 |
| 3. | "Halloween" | 3:34 |
| 4. | "Gray Cars" | 3:50 |
| 5. | "Listen To Your Parents" | 0:49 |
| 6. | "Sleep In Your Car" | 3:25 |
| 7. | "L.P." | 3:38 |
| 8. | "Useless" | 2:34 |
| 9. | "Earplugs" | 6:09 |
| 10. | "Ran Away" | 2:05 |
| 11. | "Burn Down The Building / Passionately" | 4:13 |

== Personnel ==
Insomniac Folklore

- Tyler Hentschel – Vocals, guitar, Stomping
- Adrienne Michelle - Vocals
- Amanda Curry - Bass guitar, Vocals
