= 441 (disambiguation) =

441 may refer to:

- the year 441
- the number 441
- 4-4-1, a band
- U.S. Route 441
- Wisconsin Highway 441
- Juggling pattern#441
