= Joseph McGinty =

Joseph McGinty or Joe McGinty may refer to:

- Joe McGinty (born 1963), American composer, keyboardist and arranger
- Joseph McGinty, fiddle player in Zydepunks
