= Crash Nomada =

Folk punk band based in Sweden

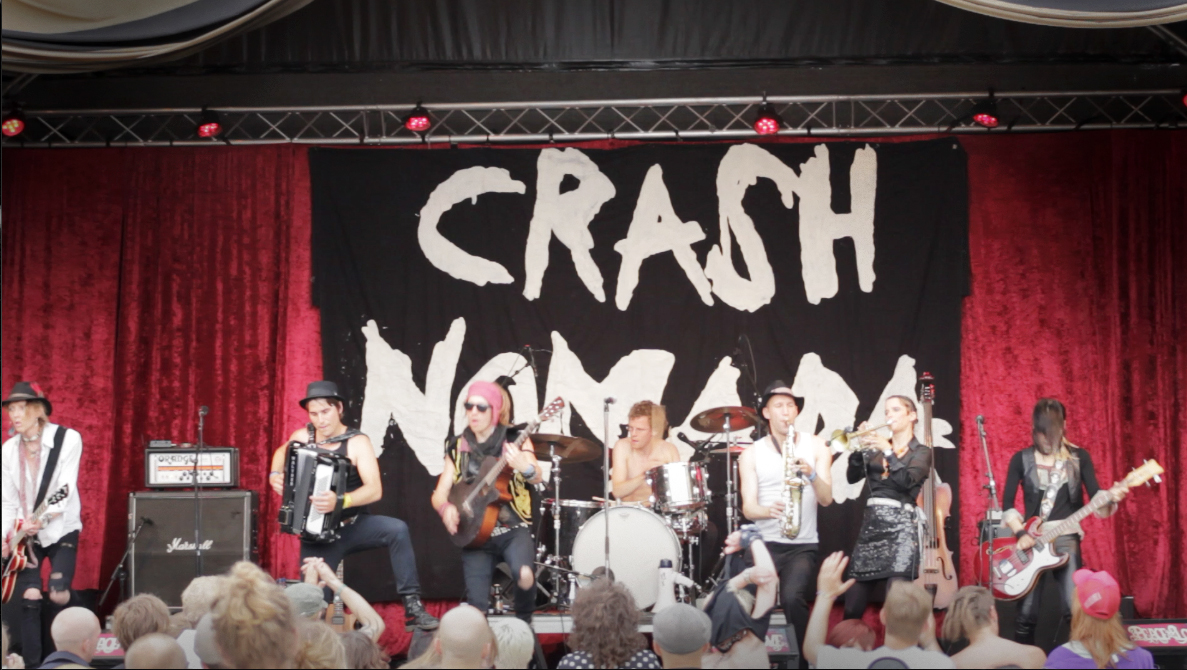
- Crash Nomada Live 2011

Background information
- Origin: Stockholm, Sweden
- Genres: Folk punk, folk metal, gypsy punk, punk, folk
- Years active: 2004-2011 (as Dorlene Love) 2011–present (as Crash Nomada)
- Labels: Birdnest Records
- Members: Ragnar Bey (Vocals); Linus Fransson (Drums); Mathilda Sundin (Bass); John Hagenby (Guitar); Walter Salé (Accordion); Sara Edin (Violin)
- Website: crashnomada.com

Crash Nomada is a folk punk band based in Stockholm, Sweden. They are known for their mix of punk rock and different kinds of folk music from around the world.

The band started out under the name Dorlene Love, originally as a punk band. However after having played a lot on the streets, the folk music influences increased.

Their debut album was released in April 2008 on the Swedish punk label Birdnest Records. In March 2011 the band was renamed to Crash Nomada.

The band is multilingual, and has mostly released songs in English and Swedish. In 2016 two singles that were produced by Jari Haapalainen, "Mälaren" and "Ljuset som du sökte," were released.

In 2017 Crash Nomada collaborated with the Egyptian singer Maryam Saleh and released the song "Leih Ya Hamam" which is a duet in Arabic and Swedish.

== Discography ==
Albums

- 2008 – Exile Deluxe (as Dorlene Love)
- 2012 – Atlas Pogo
- 2013 – Broar (EP)
- 2018 – Crash Nomada

Singles

- 2011 – "From town to town"
- 2011 – "Itineranza"
- 2012 – "Leila"
- 2016 – "Mälaren" (prod. by Jari Haapalainen)
- 2016 – "Ljuset som du sökte" (prod. by Jari Haapalainen)
- 2017 – "Leih ya Hamam" (with Maryam Saleh)
- 2018 – "Under en mörk europeisk himmel"

== Members ==
- Ragnar Bey – vocals, acoustic guitar, cümbüş,
- Linus "el Toro" Fransson – drums, percussion, vocals
- Mathilda Sundin – bass
- John "Flash" Hagenby – electric guitar, cümbüş, vocals
- Walter "Deluxe" Salé – accordion, vocals
- Sara Edin – violin, vocals

Past members

- Tomoko Sukenobu – bass, vocals
- Felicia Niño – percussion, vocals
- K. Ming – bass
