= Juana Ghani =

Juana Ghani is a band based in Salt Lake City, Utah, that performs a mix of Eastern and Central European and Romani influenced original music and Old World traditional folk songs combined with modern melodic punk. Juana Ghani's Gypsy punk music, generally played in a minor key, is more melodic, harmonious and traditional than the usual "punk" genre, but the lyrics reflect punk, often dark and at times macabre.

Juana Ghani interprets the musical heritage of the Romani people, performing musical arrangements using mainly amplified acoustic instruments rather than punk's electric instruments. Most of Juana Ghani's material is original and may be sung in one of several languages, including English, Romani, Hungarian, Slovene, Russian and Italian.

Juana Ghani is often accompanied by belly dancers, cirque performers and other interpretive dancers performing in the style of Flamenco and other traditional Romani or "Gypsy" styles, presenting raucous and energetic concert experiences.

== History ==
Juana Ghani was founded in 2009 by Brian Bonell and his wife, Leisl Bonell. After writing and recording several songs in their home studio, the couple began posting these songs online under the name Juana Ghani. In 2010, they compiled these songs into the self-released EP Budmo!.

Mandolinist Tony Semerad and accordionist Nick Newberry soon joined them. Together, these four formed the foundation for the band.

In March 2011, the Bonells joined forces with Salt Lake City, Utah belly dancers Amanda Borba and Kelsey Covington to create the Underground Gypsy Cabaret, an event that featured Gypsy and Middle Eastern influenced bands, dancers and cirque performers performing with Juana Ghani. The Underground Gypsy Cabaret ran four times per year through July 2012. The Underground Gypsy Cabaret disbanded in August 2012.

In 2011, the band performed at the Ogden Arts Festival, returning each year through 2016. The group also performed at the Utah Pride Festival in 2011, 2012, 2013, and 2015, the Acoustic All-Stars Festival from 2011 to 2015, and the Urban Arts Festival in 2016. Between 2011 and 2015, the band performed each year at the Utah Arts Festival.

In December 2011, Juana Ghani opened for the New York City–based Grammy award-winning klezmer band The Klezmatics.

In July 2012, founder Brian Bonell published the novella "Kasojeni Bay" to accompany the release of Juana Ghani's full-length debut CD Shall We Live Forever.

In September 2012, Juana Ghani opened for world punk band Firewater, currently based in Istanbul, Turkey. In October 2012, Juana Ghani opened for Asheville, North Carolina–based dark cabaret band Hellblinki.

Juana Ghani was named "Best of the Beehive" by Salt Lake Magazine in 2012 and was nominated for CWMA "Band of the Year" in 2013.

In March 2013, Juana Ghani opened for Portland, Oregon–based cabaret band Vagabond Opera.

Juana Ghani's sophomore album, "She Lost Her Head" was released June 13, 2014, and features artwork by Balkan Expressionist Paul Hitter from Bucharest, Romania.

In July 2015, Juana Ghani opened for Denver, Colorado–based band DeVotchKa.

== Discography ==
Budmo! (2010)

Tracks:
1. Quiet and Cold
2. Raise Your Glass
3. Breathing
4. The Incredible Sadness of Sonia
5. What It All Burn

Shall We Live Forever (2012)

Tracks:
1. Murder of Crows
2. Amari Szi Amari
3. What Did I Know
4. We Don't Remember
5. The Incredible Sadness of Sonia
6. Kasojeni Bay
7. Breathing
8. Raise Your Glass
9. Whispers in the Woods

She Lost Her Head (2014)

Tracks:
1. Watch It All Burn
2. Pyaterochka
3. One Man Dead
4. Na Zdorovie
5. Tu Jésty Fatá
6. Spanish Raven
7. Canta Bella
8. Sing, Little Bird
9. Third of May
10. Voices
11. She Lost Her Head
Bonus. In Winter Time

== Line up ==
=== Current members ===
- Brian Bonell – guitars, concertina, vocals (2009–present)
- Leisl Bonell – lead vocals, concertina (2009–present)
- Nicholas Newberry – accordion, hurdy-gurdy (2010 – 2015; 2016–present)
- Heather Gardner – banjo, vocals (2016–present)
- Phillip Miller – saxophones (2016–present)
- Bryan Bale – doumbek, percussion, bass guitar, vocals (2010–present)
- Darren Farnsworth – drumkit (2014–present)
- Bob Smith – percussion (2016–present)
- Byron Owens – doumbek, percussion, vocals (2011–present)

=== Former Members ===
- Patrick Commiskey – euphonium (2010)
- Travis Pierce – baritone saxophone (2010)
- Allen Mautner – stand-up bass (2011–2012)
- Jean Mautner – violin (2011–2012)
- David Bowen – stand-up bass (2012–2013)
- Allison Martin – flute, vocals (2012–2013)
- Hollace McMeirce – banjo, bouzouki (2010–2012; 2016)
- Georgia Bakintas – zills (2010)
- Hillary LaFrance – backing vocals (2010–2011)
- Jason Deamer – drumkit (2011–2013)
- Jeff Ringle – drumkit (2013–2014)
- Tanya Semerad – parade bass drum (2010–2013)
- Christopher Futral – doumbek (2010–2015)
- Tony Semerad – mandolin, vocals (2010–2015)
- Tiffin Brough – violin (2012–2015)
- Jennifer Klettke – sousaphone (2013–2015)
