= Dig (Adam Again album) =

Studio album by Adam Again
- Released: 1992
- Recorded: Mixing Lab "A" and "B," Huntington Beach, California; Steve McCrum's house, Whittier, California
- Genre: Alternative rock, funk rock
- Length: 40:58
- Label: Brainstorm
- Producer: Gene Eugene, Ojo Taylor

Adam Again chronology
| Homeboys (1990) | Dig (1992) | Perfecta (1995) |

Professional ratings
Review scores
| Source | Rating |
|---|---|
| AllMusic | 4.5/5 stars |
| Cross Rhythms | 8/10 stars |

Dig is the fourth album by alternative rock band Adam Again.

The album was remastered and repackaged in 2015 by Lo-Fidelity Records. The reissue included both CD and vinyl formats.

== Track listing ==
All lyrics by Gene Eugene. All music by Gene Eugene except where noted.

1. "Deep" (Music: Eugene, Greg Lawless, John Knox) – 4:17
2. "It Is What It Is (What It Is)" (Music: Eugene, Lawless) – 3:43
3. "Dig" – 3:26
4. "Hopeless, Etc." – 4:53
5. "Songwork" (Music: Eugene, Lawless) – 5:29
6. "Worldwide" – 2:07
7. "Walk Between the Raindrops" – 3:31
8. "Hidden, Hidden" – 3:26
9. "River on Fire" – 5:46
10. "So Long" (Music: Eugene, Lawless, Knox) – 4:20

== Personnel ==
Adam Again

- Riki Michele – vocals
- Gene Eugene – vocals, Rhodes piano, guitars
- Greg Lawless – guitars
- Paul Valadez – bass
- John Knox – drums

with:

- Rob Watson – keyboards (9), cello arrangements (9)
- David Raven – drums (4)
- Sarah Fiene – cello (9)

Production

- Gene Eugene – executive producer, producer, recording
- Ojo Taylor – executive producer
- Adam Again – additional production
- Brian Gardner – mastering at Bernie Grundman Mastering (Hollywood, California)
- Anna Cardenas – art direction, design, photography
