= Lit (video game) =

2009 puzzle video game

LIT
- Developer: WayForward
- Publishers: WW: WayForward Technologies; JP: Square Enix (WiiWare)
- Director: Adam Tierney
- Designers: Adam Tierney; Mark Bozon
- Programmers: Brian Littrell; Robert Koshak
- Artists: Foo Swee Chin; Colin Morrison; Jason Hitchens; Jason Gee
- Composer: Benjamin Allen
- Platform: Wii (WiiWare)
- Release: NA: February 9, 2009; PAL: October 30, 2009; JP: December 22, 2009
- Genres: Survival horror, puzzle game
- Mode: Single-player

Lit (stylized as LIT), also known as School of Darkness (スクール オブ ダークネス, Sukūru obu Dākunesu) in Japan, is a puzzle video game developed and published by WayForward Technologies for WiiWare. The game is directed by Adam Tierney and co-designed by Tierney and Mark Bozon. It was released in North America on February 9, 2009. A new game with the same name featuring a 2D cartoon art style was released on Android and iOS on October 29, 2015, and Windows in February 2017.

The game has been described as a "horror puzzler", and its style of gameplay has been compared to Sokoban, Chip's Challenge and the Adventures of Lolo series. It is built around the concept that "light is life and darkness is death".

== Gameplay ==
In LIT, a teenager named Jake must make his way through his high school, which is overrun by shadowy creatures, to save his girlfriend Rachel, who keeps in touch with him through the school's internal phone system. The game also features unlockable content, including a much more difficult time-based challenge mode called "Dark Mode".

Played from either a top-down or a third-person perspective, the game sees players controlling Jake with the Nunchuk as they aim an on-screen reticule with the Wii Remote. The reticule helps aim Jake's flashlight and is the player's point of focus. The Wii Remote's motion controls are also used, with a throwing motion used to throw objects, and players shaking the Remote to recharge Jake's flashlight.

Using the flashlight in addition to other sources of illumination such as lamps, flares, televisions, and broken windows, Jake must carve paths of light through the darkness to safely reach the exit in each room. Along with being used in combat against the monsters that roam the hallways, this manipulation of light also plays a big part in solving certain puzzles along the way. However, Jake must be careful in managing his sources of light, as some sources of illumination work on a timer, while having too many electrical appliances turned on will blow a fuse, plunging the level into darkness and resulting in Jake being pulled into the shadows by the creatures.

During the levels, Rachel attempts to contact Jake through several phones scattered across the stages. The audio for the calls makes use of the Wii Remote's speaker.

After beating the game once as Jake, if the player received all the phone calls, they are given the option to play the game again as Rachel, playing through the same level, but with Jake giving the phone calls, who still insists he will save Rachel.

== Development ==
LIT features character and creature designs by Singaporean comic artist Foo Swee Chin, with Jake's emo-styled appearance chosen to both fit the dark tone of the game and to create an interesting role reversal by having a teenager with a dark outlook on life becoming the one to literally light up his school. Jake is voiced by WayForward Technologies founder Voldi Way, while Rachael is voiced by KROQ DJ Nicole Alvarez.

In addition to expanded language options, the European release of the game features minor gameplay tweaks to address issues brought up in North American reviews. The game does not feature widescreen display options. According to Tierney, this is because each level is square in shape, though it was considered.

A remake with simplified gameplay and a cel-shaded art style was released by WayForward on Android and iOS in 2015 and Windows in 2017; it removes most horror elements for more straightforward puzzle gameplay.

== Reception ==
Reception

Aggregate score
Aggregator	Score
Metacritic	(Wii) 74/100

Review scores
Publication	Score
Destructoid	9/10
Edge	7/10
Eurogamer	7/10
GamePro	4/5
GameRevolution	B−
GameSpot	7.5/10
GameZone	8.8/10
IGN	7.1/10
Nintendo Life	7/10
Official Nintendo Magazine	88%
Teletext GameCentral	7/10

The Wii game received "mixed or average reviews" according to the review aggregation website Metacritic. IGN found the concept solid and "enormously creative", but found fault with occasionally awkward context-sensitive controls and inconsistent puzzles that force players into using trial and error in order to solve them. GameSpot, however, found the puzzles logical and the boss battles clever, but noted design inconsistencies.

== See also ==
- List of WiiWare games
