= Homeboys (album) =

Studio album by Adam Again
- Released: 1990
- Recorded: 1989
- Studio: The Mixing Lab (Hunnington Beach, California); Neverland (Cerritos, California); Pakaderm West Studios (Los Alamitos, California); Winetree Recording (Rancho Cucamonga, California); Icehouse (Upland, California).
- Genre: Alternative rock, funk rock
- Length: 42:16
- Label: Broken Records
- Producer: Gene Eugene

Adam Again chronology
Ten Songs by Adam Again (1988)	Homeboys (1990)	Dig (1992)

Professional ratings
Review scores
Source	Rating
AllMusic	4/5 stars
Cross Rhythms	7/10 squares

Homeboys is the third album by alternative rock band Adam Again.

== Track listing ==
All lyrics by Gene Eugene except where noted. Music by Gene Eugene and Adam Again except where noted.

1. "Homeboys" – 3:41
2. "The Fine Line" – 4:32
3. "Hide Away" (Lyrics: Steve Hindalong) – 2:51
4. "Bad News on the Radio" – 3:52
5. "Inner City Blues (Make Me Wanna Holler)" (Marvin Gaye, James Nyx) – 5:44
6. "Dance Around in Circles" – 2:38
7. "This Band Is Our House" – 5:56
8. "Save Me" (Lyrics: Riki Michele) – 4:11
9. "Occam's Razor" (Lyrics: Terry Scott Taylor) – 3:34
10. "No Regrets" – 5:24

== Personnel ==
Adam Again

- Riki Michele – vocals
- Gene Eugene – vocals, Rhodes piano, Hammond B3 organ, guitars
- Greg Lawless – lead guitars
- Paul Valadez – bass, lead guitar intro (8)
- John Knox – drums

with:

- James Werning – keyboards
- Dan Michaels – saxophone
- John Harrelson – fiddle (1), mandolin (3)
- Miles Tackett – cello (3, 9), acoustic guitar (5)
- Doug Webb – saxophone (4)
- Howard Finster – preaching

Production

- Gene Eugene – producer, recording, mixing
- Greg Lawless – additional engineer, mixing (1, 2, 5-10)
- C. Anderson – additional engineer
- Joey "Ojo" Taylor – additional engineer
- Paul Valadez – additional engineer, mixing (1, 2, 5-10)
- Jeff Simmons – mixing (3, 4)
- Dave Collins – assembling at A&M Studios (Hollywood, California)
- Mastered at Bernie Grundman Mastering (Hollywood, California)
- Bruce Heavin – art direction, layout, photography
