= Foo Swee Chin =

Singaporean comic book artist and illustrator

- Born: July 27, 1977 (age 49)
- Pseudonym: FSc

Foo Swee Chin (often abbreviated FSc) (born July 27, 1977) is a Singaporean comic book artist and illustrator.

She is the creator of several alternative comic books, including "A Lost Stock of Children" and "Mince," published by Neko Press, as well as "Chimney 25" and "Zeet", published by Slave Labor Graphics. FSc is also the co-creator of a Slave Labor Graphics title, "Nightmares & Fairy Tales", alongside writer Serena Valentino, illustrating issues 1–12, before stepping down in 2005. On June 4, 2008, Slave Labor Graphics released the first "MuZz" graphic novel, containing issues 01–09.

Chin has also collaborated with video game developer WayForward Technologies, providing creature designs for their horror game LIT. FSc did cover art for Portland, Oregon's Indie/Folk/Punk band Insomniac Folklore on their 2010 Release "LP".

She has also illustrated and published works for 講談社, 飛鳥新社 and other Japanese magazines.「クレアボヤンス 」is an e-comic published by 太田出版 in 2011. Chin has her own manga blog which chronicles her travel experiences to Japan. The blog comic has since then been picked up and serialised at コミックエッセイ劇場 under the title name <<シンガポールのオタク漫画家、日本をめざす>>.

FSc also illustrated variant covers for Oni Press's Invader Zim comics #4 and #9.

Chin has also appeared in an episode of NHK World's documentary [Spiritual Places in Nara] in 2017, and Spiritual Exploreres- mt Fuji in 2018.
