= Oh Well (album) =

Studio album by Insomniac Folklore
- Released: June 5, 2007
- Recorded: Spring 2007
- Genre: Folk music
- Length: 1:09:43
- Label: Quiver Society
- Producer: Tyler Hentschel

Insomniac Folklore chronology
Smile or Die (2005)	Oh Well (2007)	LP (2010)

Singles from Insomniac Folklore
- 1. "North to the Future" Released: October 2007

Oh Well is the fourth studio album by American indie-folk group Insomniac Folklore. It was recorded by Tyler Hentschel at PMC Studio in Portland, Oregon, during the spring of 2007 and released by Quiver Society on June 5, 2007. This is a transitional album that further explores folk music and Vaudeville. Only 1,000 copies of this album were pressed during Quiver Societies initial release.

A re-issue of Oh Well was released on Art vs Product in October 2012.

== Track listing ==
All tracks are written by Tyler Hentschel

No.	Title	Length
1.	"Ladies and Gentlemen (An Introduction)"	1:57
2.	"North to the Future"	3:19
3.	"It's Only Folk Music if the Folks Sing Along"	2:31
4.	"495"	3:38
5.	"Two Old Men"	3:08
6.	"Unfamiliar Ceiling"	5:34
7.	"In the Family Room (An Intermission)"	3:24
8.	"It Rains"	6:03
9.	"Of Flesh and Spirit"	4:35
10.	"Prophesy, Prophesy A Dollar A Day"	6:02
11.	"Grace is Still Amazing"	3:51
12.	"And The Rest of My Life, Amen"	5:14
13.	"Yet to Come (An Exit)"	20:35

== Personnel ==
Insomniac Folklore

- Tyler Hentschel – Vocals, Guitar, Organ, Banjo, Accordion, Drums, lyricist, composer, songwriter
- John David Van Beek – Violin, Slide Guitar, Accordion, Mandolin
- Brian Flechtner – Drums
- Leon Goodenough – Guitar
- Bree Bizell – Backing Vocals
- Britta Cooper – Backing Vocals
- Tim Westcott – Synth
