= Räfven =

- Origin: Gothenburg, Sweden
- Genres: Gypsy punk Gypsy folk Folk punk
- Years active: 2003–present
- Labels: Räfven Records, UncleOwen
- Members: Rasmus Blanck; Johan Dahlkvist; David Fraenckel; Jonas Lundberg; Martin Nurmi; Loke Nyberg; Per Svenner; Daniel Wejdin
- Past members: Marcus Berg
- Website: www.rafven.com

Räfven is a Swedish gypsy punk band from Gothenburg, Sweden, performing original music influenced by Eastern European folk music and the klezmer tradition. The group was formed in 2003, as a reaction against the war in Iraq.

== Line-up ==
=== Current ===
- Rasmus Blanck – double bass, electric bass, mandolin, tenor horn, pump organ (2005–present)
- Johan Dahlkvist – accordion
- David Fraenckel – trombone, trumpet, tenor horn (2004–present)
- Jonas Lundberg – acoustic guitar, electric guitar, mandolin
- Martin Nurmi – alto saxophone, flute
- Loke Nyberg – violin
- Per Svenner – drums and percussion (2006–present)
- Daniel Wejdin – Bulgarian tambura

=== Former ===
Marcus Berg – percussion (2003–2006)

== Discography ==
=== Swedish releases ===
- Live! - 3 March 2007
- "Next time we take your instruments!" – 9 April 2008 (SwingKids)
- Välkommen till Räfvbygden – 9 April 2009 (SwingKids)
- Svensk Kultur – 26 September 2011 (Räfven Records)
- Bring back the dinos – 27 May 2015 (Räfven Records)

=== Japanese releases ===
- Welcome to Foxshire – 4 July 2009 (UncleOwen)
- Next time we take your instruments!" + Live in Gothenburg, 2 CD special edition – 3 November 2009 (UncleOwen)
- Svensk Kultur – 10 August 2011 (UncleOwen)

== Concerts and music festivals ==
Within Sweden, Räfven has performed at the Urkult folk music festival, and given concerts around Sweden. The band has also appeared at international festivals including the Glastonbury Festival in 2008 and 2010, and the Fuji Rock Festival 2009, where they gave eight performances.

=== Film ===
The documentary "Räfven – The band who had a manifesto" premiered at the 31st Göteborg International Film Festival in January 2008. The band features in the closing scene of the film "För min skuld" premiered at the 34th Göteborg International Film Festival in January 2011.
