= Perfecta (album) =

Studio album by Adam Again
- Released: 1995
- Recorded: The Green Room (Huntington Beach, California); Sound Kitchen (Franklin, Tennessee).
- Genre: Alternative rock
- Length: 64:29
- Label: Brainstorm
- Producer: Gene Eugene, Ojo Taylor

Adam Again chronology
Dig (1992)	Perfecta (1995)	Worldwide Favourites (1999)

Professional ratings
Review scores
Source	Rating
AllMusic	4/5 stars

Perfecta is the fifth album by alternative rock band Adam Again. This recording is the final studio album from the group, as frontman Gene Eugene died in 2000.

== Track listing ==
All songs written by Gene Eugene, John Knox, Greg Lawless and Paul Valadez except where noted.

1. "Stone" – 4:58
2. "Strobe" – 2:31
3. "All You Lucky People" (Eugene, Knox, Lawless) – 4:23
4. "All Right" (Eugene) – 4:33
5. "Harsh" – 6:10
6. "Air" – 3:49
7. "Dogjam" – 5:37
8. "L.C." – 5:06
9. "Relapse" – 6:49
10. "Every Mother's Way" (Eugene) – 3:57
11. "What's Your Name?" – 4:57
12. "Unfunny" (Eugene) – 3:30
13. "Try Not to Try" – 3:55
14. "Don't Cry" (Eugene) – 4:23

== Personnel ==
- Riki Michele – vocals
- Gene Eugene – vocals, Rhodes piano, Moog synthesizer, guitars
- Greg Lawless – guitars
- Paul Valadez – bass
- John Knox – drums

Production

- Gene Eugene – executive producer, producer, recording
- Ojo Taylor – executive producer
- Adam Again – producers, recording
- Anne Cardenas – art direction, design, photography
