= In a New World of Time =

Studio album by Adam Again
- Released: 1986
- Genre: Rock
- Label: Blue Collar
- Producer: Gene Eugene

Adam Again chronology
In a New World of Time (1986)	Ten Songs by Adam Again (1988)

Professional ratings
Review scores
Source	Rating
AllMusic	3/5 stars

In a New World of Time is a 1986 album by rock band Adam Again, released on Blue Collar Records. It is the first release by a band that would become a staple in Christian alternative rock. The cover art was done by folk artist Howard Finster.

== Track listing ==
All songs composed by Gene Eugene.

Side one

1. "Life in the First Degree" - 3:28
2. "She's Run" - 3:20
3. "Your Line Is Busy" - 3:27
4. "You Can Fall in Love" - 5:46
5. "In a New World of Time" - 3:51

Side two

1. "Walk Away" - 3:41
2. "Miracles" - 4:42
3. "Morning Song" - 3:47
4. "(God Can) Change the World" - 3:27
5. "Reason with Me" - 4:14

== Personnel ==
Adam Again

- Riki Michele – vocals
- Gene Eugene – keyboards, guitars, vocals
- Greg Lawless – guitars
- Paul Valadez – bass

with:

- Smitty Price – keyboards
- Marky Schrock – guitar solo (2, 8)
- Ron Chase – percussion
- Kurt Rasmussen – percussion
- Dan Michaels – saxophones, Lyricon

Production

- Gene Eugene – producer
- Wally Grant – producer, recording
- Howard Finster – cover painting
