= Smile or Die =

Studio album by Insomniac Folklore
- Released: September 13, 2005
- Recorded: Summer 2005
- Genre: Folk rock, indie folk, alternative rock
- Length: 42:36
- Label: Quiver Society
- Producer: Tyler Hentschel & Chris George

Insomniac Folklore chronology
Consumer Appreciation (2003)	Smile or Die (2005)	Oh Well (2007)

Singles from Insomniac Folklore
- 1. "Dreaming From Another Coast" Released: September 13, 2005

Smile or Die is the second studio album by American indie-folk group Insomniac Folklore. It was recorded by Chris George and Tyler Hentschel at Full Circle Studio in Humboldt County, California and was released in September 2005. This album is mostly guitar and vocals with minimal accompaniment.

Smile or Die was on the HM Magazine top 5 staff pics for record of the year for 2005.

== Track listing ==
All tracks are written by Tyler Hentschel

No.	Title	Length
1.	"Intro/Wrists"	1:18
2.	"Dreaming From Another Coast"	3:09
3.	"Hung Over on Life"	5:24
4.	"Lament (With the World)"	4:11
5.	"Kids"	2:42
6.	"Bridge Song Part 2"	4:26
7.	"Winter (interlude)"	1:24
8.	"The Ghosts of Friends Who are Still Alive"	2:49
9.	"Thoughts on the Road Home"	4:02
10.	"Perfect Relief"	4:10
11.	"A Thousand Cliches"	4:44
12.	"Passionately"	1:00
13.	"Another Suicide Song"	3:24

== Personnel ==
Insomniac Folklore

- Tyler Hentschel – Vocals, Guitar, Organ, Cello, lyricist, composer, songwriter
- Britta Cooper – backing vocals on "Intro/Wrists"
