= Baildsa =

- Origin: Thessaloniki, Greece.
- Genres: Gypsy Punk, Balkan Music, Ska, Reggae, Dub
- Years active: 2007 – present
- Members: Thanos Gountanos; Yiannis Gountanos; Dimitris Havlidis; Yiannis Ioannidis; Paschalis Karvounaris; Yiannis Vamvakas; Othon Kokkinos
- Past members: Loukas Metaxas; Vassilis Maligkos; Pavlos Spiropoulos; Manolis Tsiaousis
- Website: http://baildsa.com/

Baildsa (stylised as БAiLDSA or БAiЛDSA) is a band from Thessaloniki, Greece. Founded in 2007, the band performs gypsy punk, reggae and ska together with balkan elements. Baildsa's sound includes vocals, guitar, bass guitar, drums as well as trumpets and accordion. They have so far toured in Greece, Bulgaria, Albania, and Turkey. Their first album, United States of Balkans, was released in October 2011, and can be downloaded for free from the band's website. Baildsa are currently recording their second album, which is going to be announced in the beginning of 2014. Georgia Myridakis of fridge.gr comments on Baildsa's eclectic sound - "Elements, influences and sounds, not lined up in a row, but assembled one by one and all joined together, creating an enthusiastic and very entertaining music.

== History ==
=== Early years ===
Baildsa was founded in 2007 by brothers Thanos and Yiannis Gountanos. Their first performance was in 2008. Band's name derives from Turkish word bayılmak, meaning "I am fed up !" as well as "to faint". In interviews bands' members share that they are tired of the political and social crisis in Greece, and that inspired the name "Baildsa".

=== United States of Balkans ===
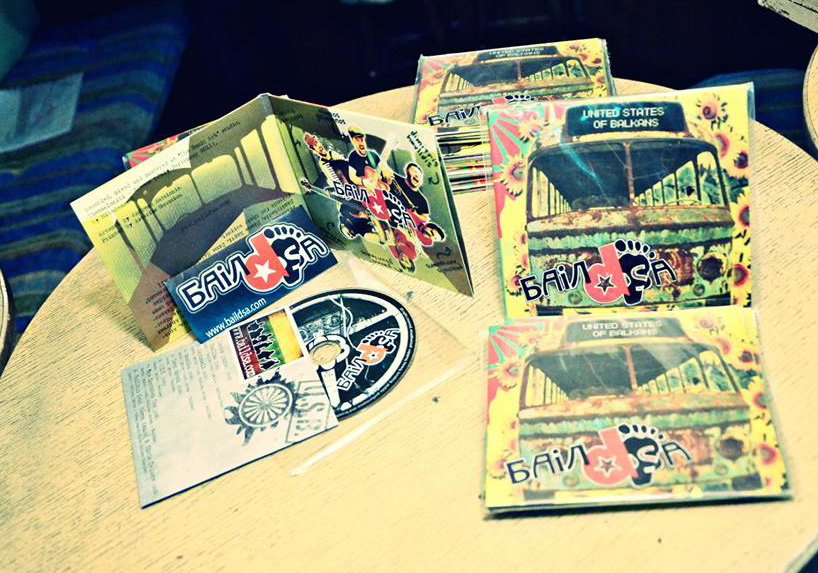
United States of Balkans on display at a concert.

Baildsa's first album named United States of Balkans was issued in October 2011. The lyrics of the first album focus on the political situation in Greece and the rest of the Balkans; Baildsa view the Balkans as historically and culturally united, and the title United States of Balkans reflects this view. In talks with medias, Baildsa share their opinion that "borders exist only on maps". United States of Balkans can be downloaded for free from the band's website.

=== Second Album ===
In late 2013, Baidsa were recording their second studio album. Titled "Zvarna", the album is expected to be issued in September 2014.

== Appearances ==
- D Festival in Dojran, on 28 July 2012.
- River Party Festival in Nestorio, Greece on 2 August 2012.
- Pivolend Festival in Skopje, in September 2012.
- Vinoskop Festival in Skopje on 13 October 2012.
- Balkan Fest in Thessaloniki, Greece on 15 March 2013.
- Baildsa Bulgarian Tour 2013. Club tour in 8 cities in Bulgaria in November 2013.
- Right Day of Voinegovtsi Wrong Fest (June 21, 2014).

== See also ==
- Balkan Music
