= Crumbächer =

American Christian band

- Origin: Southern California, U.S.
- Genres: Christian, new wave, synthpop, dance-pop
- Years active: 1983–1989
- Labels: Broken, Frontline
- Past members: Stephen Crumbächer; Dawn Wisner; Jim Wisner; Dan Hohulin; Christopher Duke

Crumbächer was an American Christian new wave, synthpop and dance-pop band in the 1980s, headed by Stephen Crumbächer.

== History ==
After five years of friendship, Stephen Crumbächer, Dawn Wisner and Jim Wisner played their first performance as Crumbächer at a New Year's Eve show in 1983. The following summer, the band entered the studio for the first time to begin recording a six-song EP for Calvary Chapel's MRC label with Ojo Taylor of Undercover producing and Derri Daugherty of The Choir engineering. Once the label heard the early results, they requested that the band record a few additional songs so that it could be released as a full-length album, instead of an EP. The album, Incandescent, was released in April 1985 on Broken Records, which was classified as a new wave material.

The band signed with the newly formed Frontline Records and began work on their second album, the self-produced Escape from the Fallen Planet which was released in 1986. The following year, after New Wave had died down, the band made the transition to dance-pop where they returned with Thunder Beach, produced by Bill Baumgart, and in 1988, the band recorded their final album together entitled, Tame the Volcano.

In the years that followed, Stephen Crumbächer teamed up with Christopher Duke for the Worlds Away project, credited to Crumbächer-Duke. Stephen himself recorded one solo album in 1991, Take It In.

The band reunited in Irvine, California on August 19, 2005 as part of the Broken Records Reunion Concert, with The Choir and other artists. It has been announced on the official website that a DVD of this performance will be released soon. A Kickstarter campaign was launched on October 4, 2016 to get funding to release the DVD.

Dawn Wisner and Christopher Duke have since formed and are currently still making music with Almost Ugly.

== Discography ==
- Incandescent, 1985.
- Escape From the Fallen Planet, 1986.
- Thunder Beach, 1987.
- Tame the Volcano, 1988.
- Worlds Away, as Crumbächer-Duke, 1990
- Take It In, 1991. Solo album by Stephen Crumbächer
- Reinvention, 1999. An MP3.com album (prior to the 2003 closing of the site).

Reissues

- Thunder Beach + Tame the Volcano (Music Value Pack) (1999) This KMG Records contains two albums on one CD. It is missing "Great Little Dancer" and "Terra Firma" from Thunder Beach, and "Once More (for the Band)" from Tame the Volcano.
- Escape From the Fallen Planet, (2011) 25th Anniversary Edition. Includes Bonus Track “Alma Mater (a capella)", remastered by Chris Duke and released by Intense Millennium Records
- Incandescent, (2013) Remastered Edition. Includes Bonus Track “It Don't Matter (What's Shakin' mix)released by Frontline Records on digital format thru amazon, iTunes and Frontline records store

Compilations and other projects

- What's Shakin', 1984. Various artists compilation featuring Stephen Crumbächer doing his original version of "It Don't Matter" (written by Stephen Crumbächer)

Stephen Crumbacher: keyboards, synthesizers, lead and backing vocals.
Gym: guitar
Recorded and mixed at Whitefield Studios by Derald Daugherty
Produced by Joey "Ojo" Taylor.

- Time After Time, 1992. "Best-of" compilation.
