= The Penny Black Remedy =

English rock band

- Origin: London, England
- Genres: Alternative Rock punk indie rock Americana folk gypsy punk
- Labels: Mono Del Mundo; Soundinistas; Random House
- Members: Keith M Thomson; Marijana Hajdarhodzic; Jeremy Mendonca; Barbara Bartz
- Website: http://www.thepennyblackremedy.com

The Penny Black Remedy is a London-based band playing a mix of country, ska, folk and punk. The band's name refers to a pub in Edinburgh called The Penny Black, which opened at the unusually early time of 5am.

The band's line-up has broad international origins; the nucleus of the band consisting of songwriter Keith M Thomson from Scotland on vocals and guitar and Croatian vocalist and percussionist Marijana Hajdarhodzić. The band's extended line up includes Jeremy Mendonca, from California, on vocals and bass guitar and Barbara Bartz from Poland on violin. Live, the line-up sometimes includes guests musicians; including Jamie Shaw and Mason Larkin sharing drum duties, and founding member of punk band U.K. Subs, Paul Slack, on bass.

== History ==
The Penny Black Remedy received the Gibson Guitar Best Alternative Act award at the 2008 UK Indy Awards.

They released their first album No One's Fault But Your Own in Spring 2009. The album was recorded in Zagreb, Croatia. They announced a global distribution deal with Cadiz Music in November 2009. They released their second album Inhale... Exhale... OK, Now You Can Panic! on 15 July 2013. Both albums were produced by Croatian producer, Robi Nappholz. Performers on both albums include Keith M Thomson on lead vocals, guitars, banjo and harmonica, Marijana Hajdarhodzić on lead vocals, Wilco van Eijk on drums, backing vocals and percussion and Steve Nelson on bass and backing vocals. No One's Fault But Your Own also featured guest musician Dzemo Cakić on trumpet. Inhale... Exhale... OK, Now You Can Panic! featured a cast of guest musicians also from Croatia, including Andrej Jakuš on trumpet, Ozren Žnidarić on saxophone, Luka Žuzic on trombone, Dzemo Cakić on trumpet, Ante Beno on clarinet, Borna Šercar on percussion and Ivor Plužarić and Robi Nappholz, both on backing vocals.

Sometimes referred to as TPBR, they released their third album Maintaining Dignity In Awkward Situations on 24 November 2017. The album was co-produced by Boz Boorer (guitarist and co-songwriter with Morrissey and The Polecats). Performers on the album include Keith M Thomson on lead vocals, guitars, banjo, bass, mandolin and percussion, Marijana Hajdarhodzić on vocals, Basia Bartz on violin, Jeremy Mendonca on acoustic guitar and backing vocals, Paul Slack on bass and backing vocals, Jamie Shaw on drums and Peter Radcliffe on drums and backing vocals. The album also featured guest musicians Teo Martinović from Croatia on hammond, and Londoners Graham Murphy, Segs Jennings and David Ruffy all on backing vocals on the song You Should've Left Your Money At Home.

TPBR released an acoustic compilation album of previously unreleased songs called Owing To Certain Complications... Vol. 1 on 16 October 2020. The album was produced by Keith M Thomson and was performed by Keith M Thomson and Marijana Hajdarhodzić. A second volume, also of previously unreleased material, is planned for release in 2021.

The songs draw on dark humour and absurdity, often dealing with drinking, paranoia and death, whilst having memorable sing-a-long choruses, which result in rowdy live shows. Extensive touring in the UK and Europe, including sold out residencies at London's venue The 12 Bar Club, have seen the group gather an enthusiastic hardcore following.

The Guardian newspaper's review of their single "I Won't Argue When I'm Dead" claimed it was "Quite simply, the finest country sing-along I've heard on the vexed pop topic of how one's body should be disposed of after death."

Thomson has pointed to the dedication of their fans being the result of the band's unusual, dark humour mixed with harking back to a traditional, almost old-fashioned take on live music gatherings: "The fact that most of my songs are about death, lost love, brothels or just trying to live in a constant state of crippling paranoid fear and cope with the daily grind of everyday life is irrelevant. If anything, encouraging people to sing loudly and out of tune about the absurdity of general existence seems to instil a sense of comfort and unity. I think."

== Lineup ==
Current band members

- Keith M Thomson - vocals, guitars, harmonica, banjo, mandolin, keyboards, bass, percussion (2004–present)
- Marijana Hajdarhodžić - vocals, percussion (2006–present)
- Jeremy Mendonca - acoustic guitar, backing vocals, bass (2014–present)
- Barbara Bartz - violin (2016–present)

Former band members

- Petar Krstanović - bass
- Phil Whelans - bass
- Lou Short - bass
- Steve Nelson - bass, backing vocals
- Tony Burton - bass
- Zig Ciscuolo - bass
- Paul Slack - bass
- Tom Williams - bass
- Peter Radcliffe - drums, percussion
- Mason Larkin - drums, backing vocals, percussion
- Wilco van Eijk - drums, backing vocals, percussion
- Jamie Shaw - drums
- Tom O’Neill-Ellis - drums
- Robert Lønn - drums
- Thomas 'T-Mag' Maguire - saxophone, clarinet
- Katy 'Missy' Elliot - saxophone
- Greg Dawson - trumpet
- Tom 'T-Bone' Exley - trombone
- Thomas Himsworth - violin, acoustic guitar, backing vocals
- Nikki Stokes - backing vocals
- Adam Green - acoustic guitar
- Chris Dixon - mandolin, accordion, backing vocals
