= Zydepunks =

American folk punk band

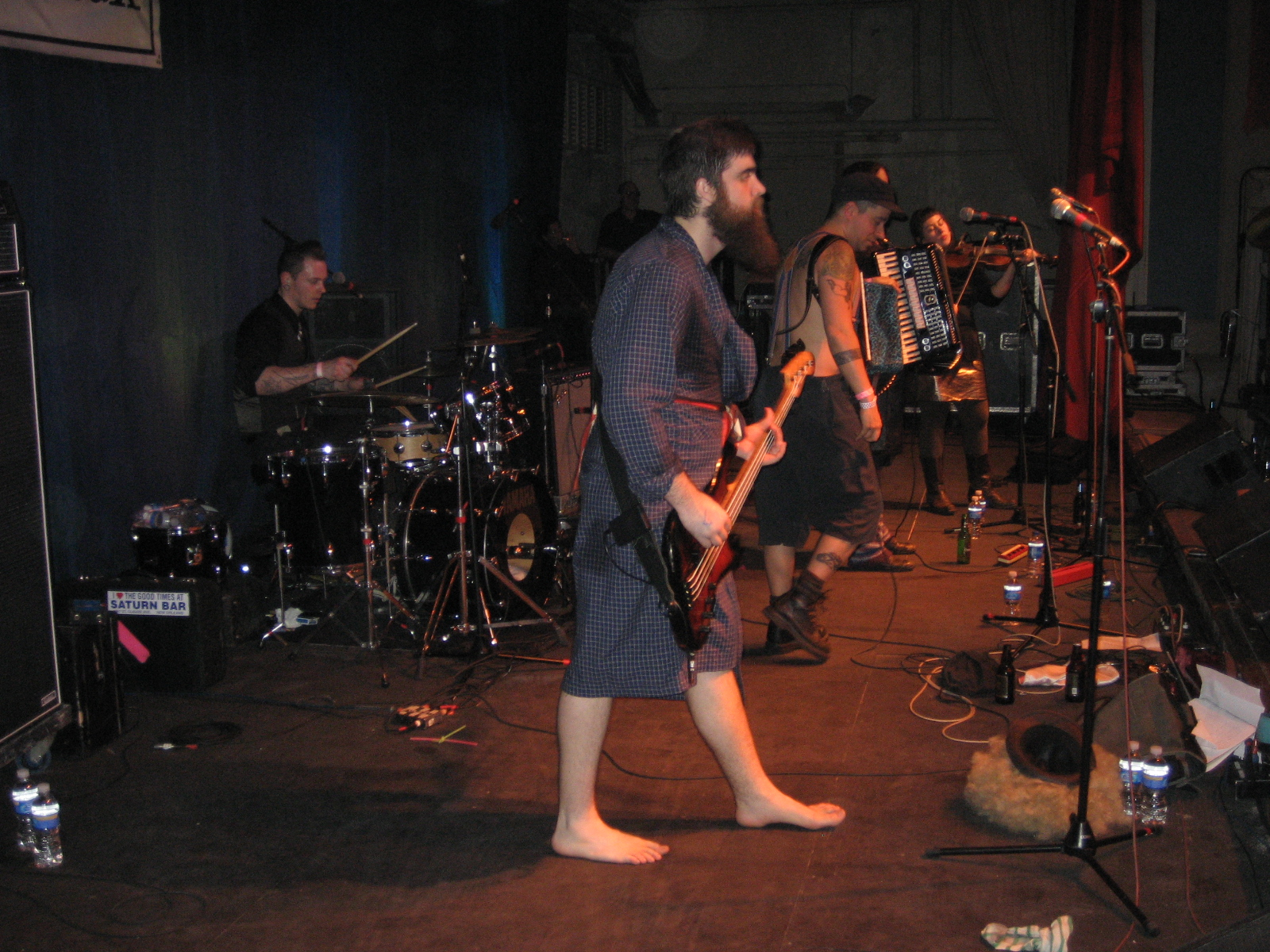
Live at the 2009 Krewe du Vieux ball New Orleans

Zydepunks (also billed as The Zydepunks) is an American folk punk band based in New Orleans, Louisiana. Founded in 2003, they play a wide variety of multicultural music, including Cajun music and zydeco, Eastern European music, and punk rock. They perform in English, French, Spanish, Yiddish, Portuguese, and German. Their instrumentation includes vocals, violins, accordions, bass guitar, and drums.

Their music is released on Nine Mile Records. They have performed at the New Orleans Jazz and Heritage Festival, and throughout the United States. In November, 2009, the band performed as part of The Revival Tour. They have been reviewed by Rolling Stone magazine and USA Today.

As of 2012, the band is on hiatus. Frontman Juan Küffner currently leads the Sacramento, California-based Hollow Point Stumblers, which blends musical influences in a manner reminiscent of The Zydepunks. Many of the band's members perform with frequent Zydepunks collaborators Debauche, a New Orleans Gypsy punk band, and My Graveyard Jaw, a Southern Country rock outfit.

== Band members ==
- Juan Küffner – lead vocals, accordion, fiddle
- Eve Venema – accordion, backing vocals
- Joseph Lilly – drums, backing vocals
- Scott Potts – bass, backing vocals
- Denise Bonis – violin, backing vocals

=== Frequent collaborators and former members ===
- Michael James – guitar
- Joseph McGinty – fiddle
- Vincent Schmidt – accordion
- Patrick Keenan – bass

== Discography ==
- 2004 – 9th Ward Ramblers
- 2005 – ...And The Streets Will Flow With Whiskey
- 2007 – Exile Waltz
- 2008 – Finisterre
