= Yum Yum Children =

- Origin: Portland, Oregon
- Labels: Boot to Head, 5 Minute Walk

The Yum Yum Children, also known as YMYM FAM, are a Christian band originally from Portland, Oregon, now based in Oklahoma. Their music is similar to that of They Might Be Giants or 1970s style art rock.

== Background ==
Prior to his involvement with the Yum Yum Children, Leon Goodenough was in a "psychedelic-thrash-garage" / hardcore band called The Clergy, which also included vocalist Christi Simonatti, drummer, Randy Simonatti, and bassist Jim Swanson. They released only one album, RUAMI, in 1993 on Broken Records. RUAMI was recorded live in the studio and featured an overall sound similar to that of X or early Concrete Blonde. One reviewer stated that their style "switches gears faster than a Lamborghini" and that the band displayed an excellent songwriting sensibility. The Clergy toured with Crashdog and the Jesus Freaks in 1994.

Following RUAMI, Leon and Jennifer Goodenough created the Yum Yum Children with a reformed lineup of players and a new sound, which was now comparable to the general market bands The B-52's, or Violent Femmes, or in Christian markets Fat and Frantic. Speaking about the transition to the Yum Yum Children, True Tunes News reported that the Goodenoughs "seem to have eaten some bad cheese and have gotten all goofy on us." Their songs generally have complex and imaginative structures and arrangements, with lyrics that match in complexity and silliness. Their lyrics are based in their Christian viewpoint, although at times the message is not easily decipherable.

Goodenough created Yum Yum Children originally as a solo project as an outlet mixing elements of 60's bubblegum, garage, folk, and mod into a palatable helping of eccentricity. The songs generally have complex and imaginative structures and arrangements, with lyrics that match in complexity and silliness. Under the name "Yum Yum Children" the band released Tastythanks, Dufisized, Used to Would've, and later as "YMYM" released Bulletin of the Returner and The Sparkle in Someone's Eye. Currently performing under the moniker of "YMYM FAM", Goodenough and his children perform their quirky rock originals.

Goodenough and his bandmates have performed at Tom Fest, Cornerstone Festival, XFestNW, various clubs, coffee houses and churches in Portland, Spokane, Bartlesville, and Tulsa.

Yum Yum Children has been associated with Boot to Head Records, Five Minute Walk Records, and Quiver Society for the releases of their albums.

== Discography ==
- 1994: Tastythanks
- 1995: Dufisized (Boot to Head)
- 1996: Used to Would've (5 Minute Walk)
- 2007: Bulletin of the Returner (Quiver Society)
- 2008: The Sparkle In Someone's Eye

== Members ==
=== Original lineup ===
- R. Leon Goodenough – vocals, guitar
- Jennifer Goodenough – vocals
- Bob Sable – percussion
- Dennis Childers – keyboard
- Craig Smith – jazz bass, vocal

=== Additional musicians ===
- Mark McCary – drums
- Brock Dittus – bass
- Jon Weller – keys

=== Current lineup ===
- R. Leon Goodenough – vocals, guitar
- Jennifer Goodenough – vocals
- Ephraim Goodenough – drums, violin, mandolin, synth, vocals
- Havilah Goodenough – keyboards, vocals
- Asaph Goodenough – Bass, vocals
- Zion Goodenough – Drums
- Zuriel Goodenough – Keyboards, vocals
- Naphtali Goodenough – Drums
