= Altar Boys =

American Christian punk band (1982–1992)

- Origin: Southern California, US
- Genres: Christian punk
- Years active: 1982–1992
- Labels: Ministry Resource Center; Alarma; Lo-Fidelity
- Spinoffs: The Altar Billies
- Past members: Mike Stand; Jeff Crandall; Steve Pannier; Ric Alba; Mark Robertson

Altar Boys were a Christian punk band from California formed in 1982. The original members were Mike Stand (vocals, songwriting and guitar), Jeff Crandall (drums), Steve Pannier (guitars) and Ric Alba (bass guitar and backing vocals). Mark Robertson later replaced Alba on bass guitar.

== Background ==
The Altar Boys helped to pioneer Christian rock music. They were known for their Ramones-style punk music which was differed radically from the Christian music common at the time of their formation. Especially in their early years, they were known for being explicit with their faith in their lyrics. Their sound was heavily influenced by the punk rock scene in Southern California and they quickly became one of the best known Christian bands on that scene.

The Altar Boys' first album was issued on various labels (e.g. Ministry Resource Center/MRC, Maranatha! Music and Broken Records) and sold over 7,000 copies with their second selling 20,000 in its first two months of release.

Their third and fourth releases, Gut Level Music and Against the Grain, propelled them to national standing. Gut Level Music was explicitly aimed at a secular audience, and marked changes designed to enhance their credibility with that audience. Their lyrical approach changed toward a more subtle expression of their faith. They also refined their sound in an attempt to distance themselves from the punk "garage band" image that they had acquired early on.

Their final studio album, Forever Mercy, was released in 1989 and supported with another tour. Some time after the tour, Alba left the band and was replaced by Mark Robertson. Work had begun on a follow-up album, tentatively titled No Substitute, when the Altar Boys went on an "indefinite hiatus" in 1992.

The group did a number of reunion concerts of which the most notable were Cornerstone 2000 and 2002, and the Broken Records reunion event in July 2005. The group's final performance was in June 2006 at the Corona del Mar Fairgrounds.

The group of four performed live for their final show on September 16, 2018, at House of Blues in Anaheim for the new release of the No Substitute album. At the sold-out performance, the Altar Boys performed crowd favorites Gut Level Music, a few new songs from No Substitute, and other well-known songs from their other albums. Stand's son made guest appearances on both drums and backing guitar. The show's opening act was Crumbacher, which was its first reunion since 2011.

Stand has resurrected many of the Altar Boys songs with a "punktry" project called The Altar Billies.

Drummer and Stand's cousin, Jeff Crandall, is currently a connector with Worship Catalyst in Tucson, Arizona, who acts as a mentor, coach and trainer to worship leaders in Tucson and across the US.

== Album discography ==
- 1984: Altar Boys (Ministry Resource Center)
- 1985: When You're a Rebel (Alarma Records)
- 1986: Gut Level Music (Alarma Records)
- 1987: Against the Grain (Alarma Records)
- 1989: Forever Mercy (Alarma Records)
- 1990: The Collection (Alarma Records)
- 2000: Live at Cornerstone (M8 Distribution)
- 2000: Mercy Thoughts (M8 Distribution)
- 2018: No Substitute (Lo-Fidelity Records)
