= Ten Songs by Adam Again =

Studio album by Adam Again
- Released: 1988
- Genre: Rock
- Length: 52:48
- Label: Broken
- Producer: Gene Eugene

Adam Again chronology
In a New World of Time (1986)	Ten Songs by Adam Again (1988)	Homeboys (1990)

Professional ratings
Review scores
Source	Rating
AllMusic	3/5 stars

Ten Songs by Adam Again is a 1988 album by rock band Adam Again, released on Broken Records, their second release.

== Track listing ==
1. "Tree House" (composed by G. Eugene and Steve Hindalong) (6:52)
2. "Beat Peculiar" (composed by G. Eugene and Steve Hindalong) (8:19)
3. "Who Can Hold Us" (composed by G. Eugene) (4:29)
4. "Babylon" (Traditional) (1:45)
5. "I've Seen Dominoes" (composed by G. Eugene) (6:15)
6. "Trouble with Lies" (composed by G. Eugene) (5:16)
7. "Ain't No Sunshine" (composed by Bill Withers) (2:38)
8. "Eyes Wide Open" (composed by G. Eugene) (5:51)
9. "Every Word I Say" (composed by G. Eugene) (5:46)
10. "The Tenth Song" (composed by G. Eugene) (5:47)

== Production notes ==
- Produced by Gene Eugene
