= Blaster the Rocket Man =

American Christian horror punk band

- Origin: Indianapolis, Indiana
- Genres: Christian punk, horror punk, surf punk
- Years active: 1994–2002, 2018, 2025
- Label: Boot to Head Records; Jackson Rubio Records
- Members: Daniel Petersen; Brett Sempsrott; Ty Sempsrott; Dustin Spock
- Past members: Dave Petersen; Chris Dickens; Michael Schauss; Jason Allender; John (Grey) Vogel; JR Dyche; Alex Bond; Oxford Don (Elijah Sheridan); Rusty Sempsrott; Patrick Tisdale Doug Vann

Blaster the Rocket Man was a Christian horror punk band from Indianapolis, Indiana. It formed in the early 1990s as Blaster the Rocketboy and signed with Boot to Head Records in 1994. It released two albums before signing with Jackson Rubio Records. Its name changed to Blaster the Rocket Man for its 1999 release The Monster Who Ate Jesus. Its final release was The Anatomy of a Monster, a compilation of material from its Boot to Head years plus some bonus material.

== History ==
=== 1994–1995: Formation and Disasteroid ===
According to the band's myspace page, in 1994 Daniel Petersen (a.k.a. "Otto Bot") came up with the idea for a rock opera entitled "Blaster the Rocketboy." This never came to be, but instead grew into a punk rock band with the same name. During the band's formation, many changes in the lineup occurred, until it finally solidified with Daniel Petersen on the microphone, his brother Dave on drums, Michael “The Man” Schauss on the bass, and Chris Dickens on guitar. Daniel's brother Dave was only 13 at the time, and he was the main songwriter. In late '94, the band joined Boot to Head Records and put out their first album, Disasteroid, the next year. This cassette tape attracted attention, and a small fan base began to form. The cassette sold out and remained out of print until '98, when it was re-released. This, too, sold out, and the album can now be found on The Anatomy of a Monster, the band's final release.

=== 1996–1998: Succulent Space Food for Teething Vampires and touring ===
Soon after, the band released its second album, Succulent Space Food for Teething Vampires, in late '96/early '97. This was the group's final album with "Boot to Head Records" before going to Jackson Rubio Records under the name "Blaster the Rocket Man."

A common theme throughout the album is redemption through Jesus Christ, found in such songs as "All the Way to the Blood Bank," with the lyrics, "What can wash away my sin? Nothing but the blood of Jesus!," and in "Flesheaters,"Oh, I'm alive in Christ." As is typical with the horror punk genre, many of the band's songs deal with "monsters" such as werewolves ("American Werewolf"), vampires ("All the Way to the Blood Bank"), and many others in "Creature Feature."

The CD did well, and Blaster's fan base was growing. During this time Daniel took over songwriting duties, penning most of the tracks on the record. In 1998, the band went on tour with The Huntingtons.

=== 1999–2000: The Monster Who Ate Jesus and split ===
The band soon switched labels, signing with Jackson Rubio Records and changing its name to "Blaster the Rocket Man." With the maturation of its name change came the maturation of its sound; with its first record under the new label, The Monster Who Ate Jesus, the band's music had become tighter, better-produced. They added in some Western, some rockabilly, and blues. In 2000, the band headlined a West Coast tour. While on their way back, the group decided to break up.

=== 2001–current: Post-breakup, The Anatomy of a Monster, and reunions ===
Drummer Dave Petersen (a.k.a. Heater Hands) went on to join the band Squad Five-0 soon after Blaster unofficially disbanded in the summer of 2000. After the split Otto formed the Voice of the Mysterons in his current home of Scotland. Bassist, Mikey Rocket (Michael Schauss), quit the band and over the years became a teacher, teaching History at Benjamin Bosse High School and leading worship at Faith Bible Church in Evansville, Indiana.

Since the split of Squad Five-0 Dave Petersen joined Philadelphia indie rockers Marah for a short while. He currently plays in Adam and Dave's Bloodline, another Philadelphia rock band alongside Adam Garbinski (formerly of Speedy Delivery, The Huntingtons, One21, Squad Five-O and Marah).

Daniel Petersen and various friends of the band got together for a reunion show in Indiana in 2002 (which was recorded and released on its compilation The Anatomy of a Monster in '02), and again for the Cornerstone Festival in Illinois in 2004, and two more at Cornerstone 2008.

In 2002, the band reunited with Boot to Head Records to release its final album: a compilation including all three of its prior albums, plus live material from a show played in Indiana the same year.

On May 18, 2011, Otto announced, via his Facebook profile, that Blaster the Rocket Man and Voice Of The Mysterons had released a split EP via Crossroads of America Records and Flannelgraph Records. This was originally released as a limited 100 press 3" CD available in October 2010 via subscription only. His announcement made it clear that the release was now available to the general public as a digi-download via Bandcamp. The release featured four Voice of the Mysterons songs, two Blaster the Rocket Man songs, as well as some spoken word by Otto. It was initially a part of the "Laminar Excursion Monthly" series. Blaster the Rocket Man's songs from this split were later re-released on a 7" split with folk punk band Destroy Nate Allen in 2012 via High Endurance Records.

Daniel Petersen wrote and performed a spoken word piece for the gypsy-folk-punk band Insomniac Folklore entitled, "The Homecoming: A Sermon for Certain Serpent-Servants and Sundry Other Unsavory Characters." This piece appeared on their June 2011 release "A Place Where Runaways Are Not Alone." Adrienne Curry of Insomniac Folklore later adapted the piece into a short play that was performed at Fontbonne University on December 11, 2011. In March 2012, Daniel also recorded a track titled "The Story of Horror Boy" for Insomniac Folklore. The spoken word piece can be found on The Scariest Thing in the Dark E.P.

== Musical style and influences ==
Blaster's sound is often compared to that of the Dead Kennedys or Man or Astro-man?, though headman Otto Bot (stagename for Daniel Petersen) denied any direct influence. A review by HM compared the music to the combined sounds of werewolf movies, Elvis, and the Sex Pistols (among others), further stating that "this is what CREATIVE Christian music sounds like." The lyrics use horror and sci-fi themes as Christian allegories; HM describes it as using the characters of evil to communicate biblical truth. The Monster Who Ate Jesus includes a number of songs inspired by C. S. Lewis' Space Trilogy. Many included themes disdaining Secular humanism. Blaster was also well known for its stage antics, including masks and costumes as well as frequent audience participation. Masks that Otto wore on stage include a werewolf worn for the band's werewolf-themed songs (such as American Werewolf and I Like Lycanthropy) as well as a fly mask, which he wore for Human Fly Trap.

== Members ==
=== Current ===
Last show played in July 2008.

- Otto Bot (Daniel Petersen) – vocals/lyrics
- Brett Sempsrott – drums
- Ty Sempsrott – guitar
- Dustin Spock – guitar
- Jason Allender – bass

=== Former ===
- Heater Hands (Dave Petersen) – drums, guitar on most recordings
- Chrissy Rocket (Chris Dickens) – guitar
- Jason Allender – guitar
- Rusty Sempsrott – guitar
- Mikey Rocket (Michael Schauss)- bass
- Oxford Don (Elijah Sheridan) – bass
- John Grey Vogel – bass

== Discography ==
=== Studio albums ===
Year	Album details
1995	Disasteroid: Released: 1995; Label: Boot to Head Records
1997	Succulent Space Food for Teething Vampires: Released: 1997; Label: Boot to Head Records
1999	The Monster Who Ate Jesus: Released: August 10, 1999; Label: Jackson Rubio Records; Reviews: The Phantom TollBooth, HM Magazine

=== Compilations ===
Year	Album details
2004	The Anatomy of a Monster: Released: 2004; Label: Boot to Head Records; Review: HM Magazine

=== EPs ===
Year	Album details
2010	Doctor NoBot and His Anti-Automatons Present: A Macabre Menagerie and Blessed Bestiary — Cunningly and Cussedly Commingled for Your Delighted Dread and Deviant Devotion (Caution: Not Recommended for Listening to Alone or In The Dark): Released: October, 2010; Label: Crossroads of America Records & Flannelgraph Records
