= Gypsy punk =

Hybrid music genre that crosses traditional Romani music with punk rock

- Stylistic origins: Punk rock; Romani music; folk punk; post-punk; klezmer
- Cultural origins: Late 1990s, United States
- Typical instruments: Guitar; drums; bass guitar; fiddle; accordion

Regional scenes
- New York City

Other topics
- Anti-folk; dark cabaret

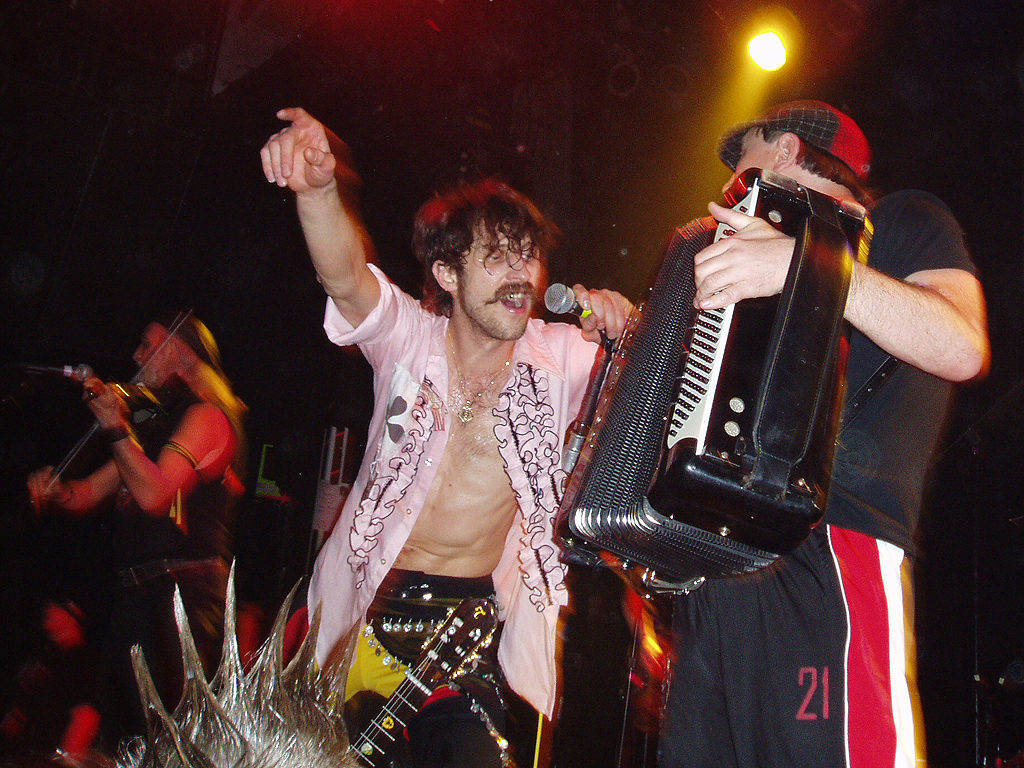
The Gypsy punk genre takes its name from Gypsy Punks, a 2005 album by Gogol Bordello, pictured here in concert in 2006.

Gypsy punk is a hybrid musical genre that combines traditional Romani and Eastern European folk music with punk rock, and is considered a subgenre of the wider label of folk punk. One of the first rock groups to incorporate elements of punk and Roma music was Boiled in Lead, which was founded in 1983 and is still active today. A broader audience became aware of the genre after the band Gogol Bordello released the album Gypsy Punks: Underdog World Strike, with front man Eugene Hütz describing their performance as a "Gypsy Punk Cabaret".

Gypsy punk bands usually combine rock beats and instrumentation with more traditional Roma instrumentation such as drums, tambourine, accordion, fiddle, trumpet and saxophone.

== History ==
The origin of the term "gypsy punk" may be disputable, but it is agreed that the Romani culture is how the style of it began. The Romani people, who are spread out throughout the world, have affected the music industry in the west as seen through bands such as Gogol Bordello. Eastern European and traditional instrumentation and multilingual lyrics are both common characteristics of Romani music. In the case of Gogol Bordello, the upbeat tempo and "punk scream-singing" along with these common "gypsy" characteristics create a concrete example of what is known as gypsy punk. "The word 'gypsy' coupled with the term 'punk' has interesting implications in that punk encapsulates a particular mode of rebellion, anarchy, and resistance in a Western context", which is good to note since at the time Gogol Bordello and other bands were introducing this genre, "the punk movement became identified in mass culture as the definitive statement of the annihilation of musical and societal norms, collectively rejecting the rules of the past because of the bleak and hypocritical present and future they provided". This is to say that the Roma that have settled down in the west have taken elements from "Romani music in a style that is indebted to Western punk". Because gypsy punk is a mixture of traditional music and popular music to the western culture, the Romani are colonizing and seemingly settling into a loose identity of their own. The music itself "is considered to be a post-colonial movement".

== Philosophy ==
Since their migrations from their original homeland in India, the Romani have been so spread out that they "lack a homeland". Gypsy punk is not just full of Romani culture, but also the lack thereof. For the Romani, music has been identified as a "primary form of cultural expression". The Romani, through their ties with the western punk influence, have created music that allows those who play to express themselves and forge an identity.

Gypsy punk is not only utilized and performed by people of the Romani, or "gypsy", culture. Punk encapsulates "rebellion, anarchy, and resistance". These thoughts are transferred then to the hybrid genre of "Gypsy Punk". This insinuates that gypsy performances and the music itself promotes a freedom for those who participate in the genre, and serves a romanticized version of the lives of an actual "gypsy". Instead of identifying with "Russian", "Jewish", "Eastern European", or similar labels, performers can "articulate their identities, while joining in the performance of being a wild and wandering gypsy". By making the actual gypsy culture seem like something it is not, "it does not consider the authenticity of Roma representation but rather replicates an idealized and dreamed-up version of what being a gypsy means".

== Prominent gypsy punk bands ==
- Afenginn
- Alamaailman Vasarat
- Baildsa
- Balkan Beat Box
- Besh o droM
- Blackbird RAUM
- Boiled in Lead
- Crash Nomada
- DeVotchKa
- Diego's Umbrella
- The Dreadnoughts
- Emir Kusturica & The No Smoking Orchestra
- Erik & The Worldly Savages
- Firewater
- Foltin
- Gogol Bordello
- Golem
- Haydamaky
- Insomniac Folklore
- Juana Ghani
- KAL
- Kultur Shock
- The Lemon Bucket Orkestra
- Mischief Brew/Guignol
- The Mouldy Lovers
- The Penny Black Remedy
- Räfven
- RotFront
- Viza
- The World/Inferno Friendship Society
- Zdob şi Zdub
- The Zydepunks

== See also ==
- Anti-folk
- Cabaret
- Folk punk
