= Tyler Hentschel =

American musician and artist (born 1982)

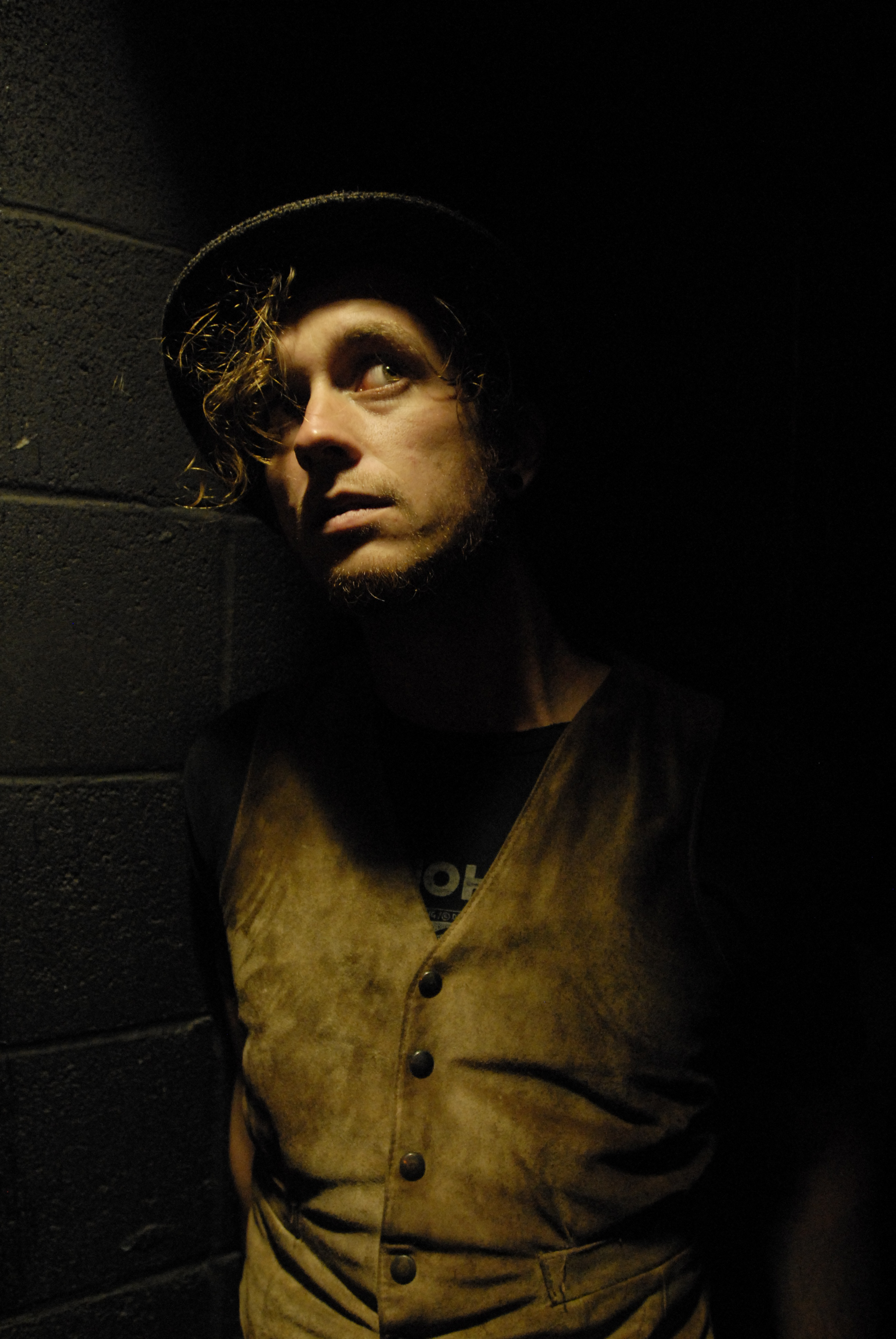

Background information
- Born: Tyler Benjamin Hentschel; December 16, 1982 (age 43); Roseburg, Oregon
- Genres: Alternative rock, Indie Folk
- Occupations: Artist, performer, musician, songwriter, actor
- Instruments: Vocals, guitar, keyboard
- Years active: Since 2001
- Website: insomniacfolklore.com

Tyler Benjamin Hentschel (born December 16, 1982), sometimes known as Dr Folklore, or Rev Folklore is an American performer who is best known for his work as the lead singer, guitarist, and lyricist/composer of the group Insomniac Folklore. He has had a successful career as an artist and touring musician.

== Life and career ==
Hentschel was born Tyler Benjamin Hentschel in Roseburg, Oregon's Douglas Community Hospital, He attended Umpqua Valley Christian School, during high school. Tyler got his first guitar freshman year and started playing in punk rock and hard core bands. During this time he was writing his own songs on acoustic guitar and looking for someone to sing them. When he couldn't find a singer he decided to fill the role himself. "I never considered myself a singer" Hentschel Says, "and when I first started, I wasn't! My junior year I played at a school assembly in front of a couple hundred people. I did three of my songs, and looking back, that was the boldest thing I have done up to that point because I was terrible!" Junior year he was playing as "The Tyler Hentschel Band" and soon changed the name to "Insomniac Folklore". He continued to play music locally and worked as a courtesy clerk at a grocery store and also as a janitor until his touring career began in 2003.

Tyler was married to Adrienne Michelle Curry in 2011.

He has also lived in Portland, OR and St Louis, MO.

Tyler has mentioned that he wished he sounded cooler on this Wikipedia page.

== Insomniac Folklore ==
Insomniac Folklore is an American indie, folk, punk music group from Portland, Oregon. The group is currently made up of Rev Tyler Hentschel, Adrienne Michelle and Amanda Curry with other members joining them from time to time. Tyler is the projects only consistent member since he founded the group in 2001 as a folk-punk, solo act.

The projects name came from what Hentschel describes in an interview as, "a long running battle with insomnia." during this time he was writing songs, "This is when this project was born. It was just a name for my solo project. It was my stories and beliefs, or my 'folklore,' and I was an insomniac."

After his first tour in 2003, Hentschel decided that "this is really what I want to do with my life." Since then, Insomniac Folklore has released six, full-length studio albums, numerous other recordings and completed multiple tours of the continental United States.

== Other work ==
Other than artwork for his own projects, Hentschel has done album art for acts like, Destroy Nate Allen and Kevin Schlereth.

Hentschel is credited with recording and producing an album called "Until My Ankle is Better" by Destroy Nate Allen.

Tyler has made a few small appearances on the 3rd and 4th seasons of the ABC network television show, Nashville.

In 2016 Hentschel worked stage crew for the thrash metal act, Slayer and operated spot light for the shock rock pioneer, Alice Cooper.

== Insomniac Folklore Discography ==
Studio albums

- Despite It All (2001)
- Consumer Appreciation (2003)
- Smile or Die (2005)
- Oh Well (2007)
- LP (2010)
- A Place Where Runaways Are Not Alone (2011)
- Everything Will Burn (2017)

EPs

- "Split EP w/ Nate Allen" (2005)
- "Split EP w/ The Gray Fox" (2008)
- EP (2010)
- Folklore, Narcissism, Destruction (2011)
- The Scariest Thing in The Dark (2012)
- Kill a Tree for Jesus (2012)

B-side and demo albums

- What a Mess Vol. 1 (2010)
- Alone (2010)

Live albums

- Live in Salem (2006)

Singles

- "Listen to Your Parents (But Don't Trust the Government)" (2013)

Compilations

- "Quiver Society Comp 1" (2006)
- "Failing Records: A Compilation Of Portland Music Volume 4" (2007)
- "Folk Family Union Volume 2" (2010)
