= Maths Class =

British rock/punk bands

- Origin: Brighton, England
- Genres: Math rock, dance-punk, experimental rock, indie rock, electronic rock
- Years active: 2006–2010
- Label: Unsigned
- Members: Tim Sketchley; Piers Cowburn; Andy Davies; Aleksandar Damms; Michael Gartside
- Past members: Rick Tipton
- Website: http://www.maths-class.co.uk/

Maths Class were a British band from that formed in 2006 in Brighton, England, and achieved publicity through their Myspace. They have a wide range of influences and have played extensively around the UK and in Europe. They have also toured Japan in September 2008.

== History ==
=== Beginnings ===
Maths Class first gained publicity when they approached Shitdisco, who were playing at The Great Escape, and asked them if they could support them at their house party.

After supporting some of the best new bands around at the moment they were noticed by the media. The NME have highly recommended them as a breaking band, and they have been featured heavily in Artrocker. Since then they have released their first single, double A-sided "Emporio Laser"/"Cushion Glamour" in November 2007 which received airplay on radio 1 from Steve Lamacq and Huw Stephens.

Maths Class were the only band chosen by VICE Magazine to play both nights at their Vice Spain launch event in Barcelona. They also played at the Great Escape festival in May 2007., and the summer festivals Tales Of The Jackalope and Underage Festival.

Now This Will Take Two Hands, a five-track EP, was released in July 2008 on Gift Music (UK) / 1977 Records (Japan).

In 2008, they played Offset Festival and The Great Escape Festival. After The Great Escape Festival they played in their house with Rolo Tomassi. They also completed a tour with Stephen Malkmus in August 2008. On 23 July 2008, they recorded their first radio session for Marc Riley on BBC 6 music.

A promo single/video 'Peach' was recorded in February, and will be released as a download in April 2009. The video featured Ciaran Griffiths from Shameless in it.

On 10 May 2010, it was announced on Myspace that the band had split.

== Musical style ==
Artrocker recently described them as "Incredible. Best live band in the country right now"."Don't Panic magazine described the band as "the sort of hardcore math-rock that makes the kids bounce off the walls and beat the crap out of each other in spinning mosh-pits". The BBC described their sound as "jagged techno-rock".

== Members ==
- Tim Sketchley – Vocals
- Piers Cowburn – Synth, Vocals
- Andy Davies – Guitar, Vocals
- Aleksandar Damms – Bass guitar
- Michael Garthside – Drums

== Discography ==
=== Singles ===
- "Emporio Laser" / "Cushion Glamour" (12 November 2007) (Life Is Easy Records)
- "Nerves" (21 July 2008) (Gift Music)
- "Peach – Promo Single" (April 2009) (Gift Music)

=== EPs ===
- Now This Will Take Two Hands (21 July 2008, Gift Music)
