= Bradley Hathaway =

American musician (born 1982)

- Born: February 13, 1982 (age 44); Fort Smith, Arkansas, United States
- Origin: Winchester, Kentucky
- Genres: Spoken word Folk
- Years active: 2003-present
- Labels: Broke Fang, You Are A Snowflake

Bradley Hathaway (February 13, 1982) is an American spoken word poet, singer and songwriter from Fort Smith, Arkansas.

== Biography ==
Bradley Hathaway was born in Fort Smith, Arkansas and lived there until 1997, when he moved to Alma, Arkansas, where he graduated from high school in 2000.

After high school, he attended the University of Arkansas, where he majored in philosophy with a double minor in religious studies. From 2001 to 2004 while attending college, he managed the Gate, a local concert venue. In late 2002, he saw poet Clayton Scott perform, which inspired Bradley to write his first poem entitled, "I Felt Really Good This Day, Yes."

Soon after he began writing poetry, he dropped out of college and stopped managing the Gate in order to pursue writing full-time. He first toured in the summer of 2004, and has since toured with He Is Legend, The Chariot, As Cities Burn, Far-Less, and Blindside. He has played at the Creation Festival, Ichthus Music Festival, the Alive Festival, the Cornerstone Festival, Parachute Music Festival, Purple Door, and Tomfest music and arts festival.

In 2010 Bradley performed a short spoken word piece with the band Insomniac Folklore entitled "Kid and Snail" for the intro to their 'LP' album.

== Style ==
In 2004, Hathaway wrote only spoken word poetry, but has since progressed to writing songs. His first book, All The Hits So Far, But Don't Expect Too Much, was published in August 2005 and included a CD recording of performances of the poems with backing music by Night of the Wrecking Ball.

After the release of his book, Hathaway was inspired to give his poems a melody and he began to write songs. He learned how to play the guitar and has written many songs. He plans to continue going in the musical direction. Sound In The Signals Magazine has described Hathaway's vocal style as a mix of Conor Oberst and Sufjan Stevens with a hint of Ben Gibbard.

== Influences ==
- His favorite musician is Johnny Cash and is referenced in "Like Socrates Loved the Truth (So Do I Love You) "...Like Johnny loved June, So Do I love You..."
- His favorite writers are C.S. Lewis, Thomas Merton, and Ravi Zacharias.

== Discography ==
=== Studio albums ===
- All The Hits so Far, But Don't Expect Too Much: Poetry, Prose, and Other Sundry Items (2005). Accompanied by a book published through Relevant Books.
- The Thing That Poets Write About, The Thing That Singers Sing About (2007). Accompanied by a DVD and 80 page booklet.
- A Mouth Full of Dust (2009)
- A Thousand Angry Panthers (2010) - An EP containing four songs.
- How Long (2013)
- FLESH EATER (2017)

=== Live albums ===
- Happy Fun Tour (2006): A DVD that documents Hathaway's Happy Fun Tour and shows performances of many of his poems and songs. It also features his "Adventures in Kentucky" series and short films shot by his band.

== Band ==
- Bradley Hathaway- Vocals, Lyrics, Guitar
- Ric Alessio- Stand up bass, Accordion, Keyboards
- Aaron Martin- Mandolin, Banjo
- Matthew Nanes- Electric Bass, Guitar
- Joel Timen- Drums, Percussion
- Karl Wulff- Guitar, Keyboards
- Nathan Kizzia- Guitar, Trumpet, Vocals
