= Ojo Taylor =

American musician

Joey "Ojo" Taylor is an American bassist, vocalist and keyboardist, best known for his work with the Christian rock band Undercover. He produced and was a studio musician for Nobody Special, the stage name for his brother, Pat "Nobody" Taylor.

Taylor co-owned the Brainstorm Artists International record label with songwriter and Adam Again front man, Gene Eugene. He received his MBA from the University of California, Los Angeles and MM from California State University, Fullerton. He teaches History of Rock, Artist Management, songwriting, Marketing of Recorded Music, Legal Aspects of Music Industry and Entrepreneurship at James Madison University in Harrisonburg, Virginia. He performed twice in 2022 at concerts and is scheduled for one in Nashville in 2023.

== Solo projects ==
- Relative (as "Ojo") (1988) Broken Records
- Behold (2026) Innocent Media

== Undercover discography ==
- Undercover (1982) MRS Records
- God Rules (1983) A&S Records
- Boys and Girls Renounce the World (1984) A&S Records
- Branded (1986) Blue Collar Records
- 3-28-87 (live album) (1988) Broken Records
- Balance of Power (1990) Broken Records
- Devotion (1992) Brainstorm Artists International
- Forum (1994) WAL
- Live at Cornerstone 2000 (2000) Millennium 8
- I Rose Falling (2002) Galaxy21 Music

== Re-releases and anthologies ==
- Volume 1 (compilation of Undercover & God Rules) (1988) Broken Records
- Volume 2 (compilation of Boys and Girls Renounce the World & Branded) (1988) Broken Records
- Anthology Volume 1 (compilation of first four original releases) (1996) Innocent Media
- Anthology Volume 2 (compilation of last four original releases) (1996) Innocent Media
- Cornerstone 2000 (2002) Galaxy21 Music (re-release)

== Video (DVD) ==
- Instruction Through Film (cameo)
