= Insomniac Folklore =

American rock band

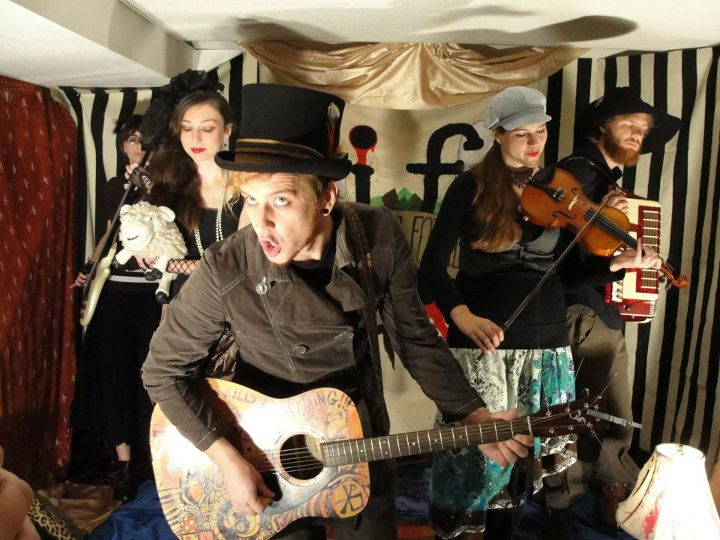
- Insomniac Folklore – during IF video shoot (2011)

Background information
- Origin: Portland, Oregon, US
- Genres: Gothic rock, Post punk, Folk rock, Dark Cabaret, Folk Metal
- Years active: 2001–present
- Labels: BD Recs; Art vs Product; Quiver Society!
- Members: Rev Tyler Hentschel; Adrienne Michelle; Amanda Curry
- Website: insomniacfolklore.com

Insomniac Folklore is an American rock band from Portland, Oregon. The group is made up of Rev Tyler Hentschel, Adrienne Michelle and Amanda Curry with other members joining them from time to time. Hentschel is the project's only consistent member since he founded the group in 2001.

== Biography ==
Insomniac Folklore had its start in the small town of Roseburg, Oregon, when lead singer Tyler Hentschel decided to start doing acoustic singer-songwriter sets (then known as "The Tyler Hentschel Band") as a side project to the punk and hardcore bands he was playing in at the time. Over the years Hentschel has been joined by a rotating cast of friends and family as they released six full-length records and three E.P.s and toured the continental United States.

The group has become known for their somewhat unpredictable live shows and their sense of camaraderie as a group. Insomniac Folklore has toured and played with acts such as Jason Webley, Chelsea Wolfe, The Fall of Troy, Wovenhand, Unwoman, The Locust and One-Eyed Doll. Insomniac Folklore has also made appearances at Steamcon, SXSW, Steampunk Worlds Fair, Audio Feed, and Tomfest.

The name "Insomniac Folklore" is a reference to Hentschel's own battle with insomnia when he started the project. Hentschel intends for the project to me more about friendship than being a "concise" band. Hentschel writes more of the material but wants everyone involved to have part of their personality in the music.

Hentschel's second release, "Consumer Appreciation" gained moderate popularity in the early 2000s, but he struggled to find an audience for his music during the several years he spent living among the redwoods in Northern California. It was during this lonely period that he released the album "Smile or Die," which in 2005 was on the HM Magazine top 5 staff pics for record of the year.

In 2006, Hentschel moved back to Oregon, taking up residence in Portland. The album Oh Well celebrates this transition with ditties such as "North to the Future" (a reference to the Joe Christmas album) and "It rains." This album also marked a turning point in the band, as the sound became darker and more theatrical, moving away from early influences such as The Beatles and Simon & Garfunkel, and showing a deeper connection with the likes of Nick Cave and Tom Waits.

On May 13, 2010, E.P., was released. This is the first stand-alone EP from Insomniac Folklore. It features a full band lineup and a very raw sound. Nate and Tessa Allen from Destroy Nate Allen provided vocals on "Campfire Song."

On June 13, 2010, L.P., Insomniac Folklore's largest project to date, was released, bringing together new material with fresh recordings of early favorites, and officially uniting the group of friends now known as the Portland chapter of Insomniac Folklore.

In 2011, Insomniac Folklore recorded and released a new full-length album, A Place Where Runaways Are Not Alone. Runaways was a concerted effort between members of the Portland and St. Louis bands, and the finished album features the work of every current member of Insomniac Folklore, and guest tracks by Daniel Otto Jack Petersen of the Horror Punk act, Blaster the Rocket Man.

On November 3, 2011, the band released a music video for the song "Useless," filmed by Emily Kathryn Curry.

The band's most recent E.P., The Scariest Thing in the Dark (2012), features songs by both the Portland and St. Louis bands, as well as spoken word tracks by Tyler and Daniel Otto Jack Petersen.

Insomniac Folklore has been associated with both the Cabaret and Steampunk movements. They have been featured on Sepiachord for the songs "Kids", "Useless" and "The Scariest Thing in the Dark".

On November 5, 2013, the band's website announced a new album in the works entitled, "Everything Will Burn" would be recorded during the winter of 2013. The album was released on June 28, 2017.

== Members ==
The only constant member of the band since the beginning is Tyler Hentschel. Every other position in the band has been filled by several of other musicians.

Dennis Childers joined the band as part-time bass player in 2007. Dennis has also played with Yum Yum Children, Flock 14, Empty Tomb & Larry Norman.

In 2008, Ayden Simonatti joined the band as a bass player then moved to drums while working with Hentschel on another project as alter egos "Runes and Numerals." Around the same time, Ayden's sisters Zoe and Anavah Simonatti joined the band as backing vocalists. Ayden, Zoe and Anavah are the children of Randy and Chris Simonatti of the alternative punk group, The Clergy. Zoe and Anavah stopped being active members of the band in 2011.

Wallace the Sheep joined the band shortly before summer tour of 2011.

=== Current members ===
- Tyler Hentschel – Vocals, Guitar, Stomping
- Adrienne Michelle – Puppetry, Vocals,
- Amanda Curry – Bass, Vocals
- Sam Ellis – Percussion, Vocals
- Peter Corbin – Hammond B3, Keyboard, Vocals

=== Part time members ===
- Joshua Hedlund – Accordion
- Lisa Barfield – Violin
- Ayden Simonatti – Drums
- Dennis Childers – Bass
- St John Van Beek – Accordion
- Danielle Maes – Violin

=== Former members and contributors ===
- Zoe Simonatti – Vocals
- Anavah Simonatti – Vocals
- Brian Fletchner – Drums
- Leon Goodenough – Guitar
- Tim Westcott – Synthesizer
- Bradley Hathaway – Voice
- Ricardo Alessio – Ironing Board
- Kat Jones – Vocals
- Daniel Petersen – Voice
- Nate Allen – Vocals
- Tessa Allen – Vocals

== Discography ==
Studio albums

- Consumer Appreciation (2003)
- Smile or Die (2005)
- Oh Well (2007)
- LP (2010)
- A Place Where Runaways Are Not Alone (2011)
- Everything Will Burn (2017)

EPs

- EP (2010)
- Folklore, Narcissism, Destruction (2011)
- The Scariest Thing in The Dark (2012)
- Kill a Tree for Jesus (2012)
- Hands, Lips and Eyes (2024)

B-side, Demo and Compilation albums

- What a Mess Vol. 1 (2010)
- Alone (2010)
- Sleep in Your Car (2014)
- The Early Years (2014)

Live albums

- Live in Salem (2006)

Singles

- "Listen to Your Parents (But Don't Trust the Government)" (2013)

Compilation albums

- "Quiver Society Comp 1" (2006)
- "Failing Records: A Compilation Of Portland Music Volume 4" (2007)
- "Folk Family Union Volume 2" (2010)
- "Eat This Comp. Volume 1" (2013) Eat this Comp. Volume 1, by Eat this Comp

== Tours ==
- Spring 2002: West Coast Tour (with Kat Jones & MAP)
- Summer 2003: "Consumer Appreciation" National Tour (solo)
- Fall 2005: "North to the Future" West Coast tour
- Summer 2006: "Smile or Die" West Coast Tour
- Summer 2007: "Oh Well" West Coast tour
- Summer/Fall 2010: "Alone" National tour (solo)
- Summer 2011: "The Runaways Tour" national
- Spring 2012: "Runaway Pioneers" Midwest tour (with Kevin Schlereth)
- Spring/Summer 2013: "You Have Died" National tour
- Fall 2013: "Going Out West" National tour (w/ Kat Jones)
- Summer 2015: National Tour (duo)
- Fall 2016: "Premonitions / recollections" National tour
- Summer 2016: Tour of South and Midwest
- Summer 2017: "Everything Will Burn" National Tour
- Summer 2018: "Duo" National Tour (duo)
- Summer 2019: "Summer Tour" West/Midwest (Full band tour)
