= The Monster Who Ate Jesus =

Studio album by Blaster the Rocket Man
- Released: 1999
- Genre: Christian Horror punk
- Length: 44:52

Blaster the Rocket Man chronology
Succulent Space Food for Teething Vampires (1997)	The Monster Who Ate Jesus (1999)	The Anatomy of a Monster (2004)

The Monster Who Ate Jesus is the first studio album of Indianapolis Christian horror punk band Blaster the Rocket Man under Jackson Rubio Records, released August 10, 1999. Though technically the band's first album, the group has put out two previous records under a different name, Blaster the Rocketboy, and with a different label, Boot to Head Records.

== Track listing ==
No.	Title	Length
1.	"Deploy All Monsters Now!"	3:34
2.	"It Came From Down South"	1:22
3.	"Hopeful Monsters are Dying Everyday"	1:15
4.	"Stampede!"	3:12
5.	"Human Fly trap (Our Hero Escapes from Venus)"	2:26
6.	"[Untitled]"	0:45
7.	"Ransom vs. the Unman"	1:50
8.	"March of the Macrobes"	2:52
9.	"Cop City"	1:38
10.	"Lovebot's Revenge"	2:03
11.	"Disasteroid"	1:20
12.	"[Untitled]"	0:49
13.	"Frankenstein's Monster Wants a Wife"	2:57
14.	"I Like Lycanthropy"	2:53
15.	"Tundra Time on Thulcandra"	1:58
16.	"Venus at St. Anne's"	2:22
17.	"Beehive Behave"	1:14
18.	"Baby Unvamp (is Making a Comeback)"	7:30

== Themes ==
Christian themes and allegories are predominant throughout the album, including songs like "I Like Lycanthropy" (with lyrics such as, "You gotta die, die, die with Jesus to know the Resurrection") and "Baby Unvamp (is Making a Comeback)," featuring the lyrics, "But now we are the Bride of Jesus Christ."

Another common theme in the album is C.S. Lewis's Space Trilogy, a series of science fiction novels. The song "Ransom vs. the Unman" details the battle of Dr. Ransom and the Unman, characters of the Space Trilogy, which is featured in That Hideous Strength, the third book of the series. "Tundra Time on Thulcandra" uses various terms found throughout the trilogy, also.

Several of the songs deal with mythical creatures such as werewolves ("I Like Lycanthropy") and Frankenstein's monster ("Frankenstein's Monster Wants a Wife").

== Personnel ==
- Otto Bot (Daniel Petersen) – lead vocals
- Heater Hands (Dave Petersen) – guitars, drums, organ, vocals
- Oxford Don – bass
