= Worldwide Favourites =

Compilation album by Adam Again
- Released: March 9, 1999
- Recorded: 1986–1995
- Genre: Alternative rock, funk rock
- Length: 70:19
- Label: KMG Records
- Producer: Gene Eugene

Adam Again chronology
Perfecta (1995)	Worldwide Favourites (1999)	A Tribute to Gene Eugene (2000)

Professional ratings
Review scores
Source	Rating
allmusic	4/5 stars
Cross Rhythms	9/10 stars

Worldwide Favourites is a compilation album by alternative rock band Adam Again. Released on March 9, 1999, it spans all five of their studio albums and features one previously unreleased track: "Sleepwalk."

== Track listing ==
1. "Worldwide" – 2:07
2. "It's All Right" – 4:33
3. "Hide Away" – 2:51
4. "Bad News on the Radio" – 3:54
5. "Strobe" – 2:30
6. "Eyes Wide Open" – 5:53
7. "Dig" – 3:27
8. "Stone" – 4:57
9. "Homeboys" – 3:41
10. "The 10th Song" – 5:32
11. "Deep" – 4:18
12. "You Can Fall in Love" – 5:46
13. "All You Lucky People" – 4:26
14. "Sleepwalk" – 3:50
15. "River on Fire" – 5:46
16. "Relapse" – 6:48
