= Undercover (band) =

American punk band

- Origin: Southern California, US
- Genres: Punk rock
- Years active: Early 1980s–present
- Labels: MRS; A&S; Blue Collar; Broken; Galaxy21; Brainstorm Artists, Intl
- Members: Ojo Taylor; Gym Nicholson; Sim Wilson; Gary Dean Olson
- Past members: Ric Alba; Danny Pavlis; Bill Walden; Dave Hackbarth; Rob Gallas; Chuck Cummings; David Raven

Undercover is an American Christian rock band based in Fullerton, California, formed in the early 1980s by Joey "Ojo" Taylor and James "Gym" Nicholson. Through more than two decades and a few lineup changes, the band released eight studio albums and two live albums, and were pioneers in what would later be called alternative music in the Christian world. The band was known for the spiritual growth shown in their music as their career progressed; CCM Magazine once called them "the band that grew up in public."

== History ==
Undercover started as a second-generation Jesus movement–based band, associated with Calvary Chapel Costa Mesa and its Maranatha! Music record label.

"God Rules," the title track of the second album, is the song that set apart Undercover in the Christian music scene from the rest of the "beginning" bands.

While the band has seen several members come and go (and come again), Taylor has said on more than one occasion that the band decided sometime after 1994's Forum that "Undercover is Ojo, Gym, Sim, and Gary," emphasizing that any other lineup, if any, would in the future be called something else.

Undercover played two reunion shows in California in August 2005. In a message posted on the band's forum that month, Taylor wrote, "We are internally, as a band, trying to figure out where to go from here and what that might look like, given our life realities and burning desire to fulfill whatever musical calling we might have, too. We appreciate your prayers."

== Music ==
When Undercover released its first album in 1982, it was described by some as "Christian punk," characterized by high-energy anthems, rebellious themes, and short, three-chord songs. Mohawk hairstyles, tattoos, and torn jeans did little to convince people otherwise; nor did the next few albums, which contained punk versions of traditional hymns ("Holy Holy Holy"), shouted vocals ("God Rules"), and simplistic, direct lyrics ("Jesus is the Best"). The CCM Magazine review of their God Rules album claimed the band was New Wave rather than punk, as "the anarchy of punk is 180 degrees opposite of these boys." However, over the years, their music has explored a variety of styles from new wave and punk to rock and hard rock.

1986's Branded took Undercover in a different direction with keyboard-laden melodies and darker, more introspective lyrics. In "Pilate", sung from the point of view of Pontius Pilate, the persona struggles with the guilt of having crucified Jesus, confessing, "I killed him, I killed him after all." Other song titles on this album were "Cry Myself to Sleep" and "Darkest Hour."

On subsequent releases, the band would continue to explore aspects of Christian life not frequently addressed by the CCM musicians who were finding increasing acceptance on secular airwaves and with secular audiences. The next several albums each differed slightly in musical tone from the others, but the introspective lyrics would be a constant through the rest of the band's career.

== Members ==
Current

- Ojo Taylor (also credited as Joey Taylor, O-Joe Taylor, and Turner Burn) – bass, keyboards, occasional vocals
- Gym Nicholson (also credited as Jim Nicholson and Neel Down) – guitars
- Sim Wilson – vocals
- Gary Dean Olson – drums, percussion

Former

- Ric Alba – bass guitar, vocals
- Danny Pavlis – drums, vocals
- Bill Walden – lead vocals, saxophone
- Dave Hackbarth – handclaps, vocals
- Rob Gallas – vocals
- Chuck Cummings – drums
- Dave Raven – drums

== Discography ==
=== Original releases ===
- Undercover. 1982, MRS Records.
- God Rules. 1983, A&S Records.
- Boys and Girls Renounce the World. 1984, A&S Records.
- Branded. 1986, Blue Collar Records.
- "You & I - EP". 1987 B-1 Music.
- 3-28-87 (live album). 1988, Broken Records.
- Balance of Power. 1990, Broken Records.
- Devotion. 1992, Brainstorm Artists International.
- Forum. 1994, WAL.
- Live at Cornerstone 2000. 2000, Millennium 8.
- I Rose Falling. 2002, Galaxy21 Music.

=== Solo projects ===
- Relative (Ojo Taylor, as "Ojo"). 1988, Broken Records.

=== Anthologies ===
- Volume 1 (compilation of Undercover and God Rules). 1988, Broken Records.
- Volume 2 (compilation of Boys and Girls Renounce the World and Branded). 1988, Broken Records.
- Anthology Volume 1 (compilation of first four original releases). 1996, Innocent Media.
- Anthology Volume 2 (compilation of next four original releases). 1997, Innocent Media.
