= Adam Again =

American rock band (1982–2000)

- L–R: Gene Eugene, Paul Valadez, Greg Lawless, Jon Knox, Riki Michele

Background information
- Origin: Huntington Beach, California, United States
- Genres: Alternative rock, funk rock
- Years active: 1982–2000
- Labels: Blue Collar; Brainstorm Artists International; Galaxy21; Lo-Fidelity; KMG
- Past members: Gene Eugene; Riki Michele; Greg Lawless; Paul Valadez; Jon Knox; Dan Michaels

Adam Again was an American rock band active from 1982 until the death of founder, leader and vocalist Gene Eugene in 2000. Other band members included Riki Michele on vocals, Paul Valadez on bass, Jon Knox on drums, and Greg Lawless on guitar. Dan Michaels often played saxophone.

Thom Jurek of AllMusic described the group as "inventive and artfully canny." Mark Allan Powell maintained that the group "priortized musical excellence and lyrical depth over commercial appeal or even accessibility." The band never achieved commercial viability and disbanded when Eugene was found dead in his recording studio on March 20, 2000, from an undiagnosed brain aneurism. Valadez died on September 20, 2013.

== Discography ==
- In a New World of Time (1986)
- Ten Songs by Adam Again (1988)
- Homeboys (1990)
- Dig (1992)
- Perfecta (1995)
- Worldwide Favourites (1999)
- A Tribute to Gene Eugene (2000)
- Adam Again Tribute Boxed Set (2001)

== Reissues ==
- In a New World of Time (1990) Reissue on CD by An Adam Again Independent Recording AAIR0001
- Homeboys + Dig (Music Value Pack) (2000) This KMG Records contains two albums on one CD. It is missing "No Regret" from Homeboys and "So Long" from Dig.
- Ten Songs by Adam Again (2002) Remastered by Lo-Fidelity Records. Only 1000 copies were made.
- Ten Songs by Adam Again (2013) Remastered by Frontline Records.
- Dig (2016) Remastered by Lo-Fidelity Records.
- In a New World of Time (2025) Remastered by Retroactive Records. Collector's Edition with card and slipcase.
- Ten Songs by Adam Again (2025) Remastered by Retroactive Records. Collector's Edition with card and slipcase.
