= De-plumed =

de-plumed

Studio album by The Choir
- Released: November 9, 2010
- Recorded: 2010
- Studios: Sled Dog Studios, Franklin, Tennessee
- Genres: Acoustic rock; Alternative rock; Christian alternative rock
- Length: 45:50
- Label: Galaxy21
- Producers: Derri Daugherty; Steve Hindalong

The Choir chronology
Burning Like the Midnight Sun (2010)	de-plumed (2010)	The Loudest Sound Ever Heard (2012)

de-plumed (full title de-plumed: laid bare, exposed, featherless) is the 13th studio release, and 12th full-length studio album, by alternative rock band the Choir, released in 2010. It was the band's first "unplugged" recording, featuring acoustic reinterpretations of songs from prior albums.

== Background ==
On July 24, 2010, the Choir performed a private acoustic concert at saxophone and Lyricon player Dan Michaels' home outside Nashville, Tennessee, for a limited group of fans who had pre-ordered the album as part of the band's top-tier "Package A." Based on the highly positive response to this stripped-down version of the band, lead singer and guitarist Derri Daugherty and drummer and lyricist Steve Hindalong decided to tour in support of Burning Like the Midnight Sun as an acoustic duo. "Our following is very devoted," Hindalong said, "so we figured most of them would already have Midnight Sun. Our initial idea was to offer a special new recording exclusively for those audiences, which would be something we could also create relatively quickly. I had recently seen one of our favorite bands, the Church, on a tour where they performed one song from each of their albums in reverse chronological order. It made for a very entertaining show. So that's where we got the idea to reinterpret a song from each of our 12 releases, from 1985 to the present."

== Recording history ==
The band went into Daugherty’s Sled Dog Studios in Franklin, Tennessee to record the new album, which was the Choir's first attempt at an "unplugged" studio recording. "It is definitely a production challenge to record without bass guitar, ambient electrics or keys," Hindalong said. "We used a bit of glockenspiel for counter-melody." The band also brought in collaborators to assist on the project, including Choir guitarist Marc Byrd's wife, Christy Glass Byrd, to sing harmonies, and Matt Slocum from Sixpence None the Richer to play cello, the latter of which Hindalong claimed was "the best decision we made." Ironically, Hindalong's favorite track on the album was the least adorned: “Love Your Mind,” which featured simply Daugherty and his Gibson J-45 guitar.

== Artwork and packaging ==
Several years before the recording of Burning Like the Midnight Sun, visual artist Ron Lyon – who would later do the artwork for that album – gave Hindalong an art piece, which inspired the title of this album. "In this particular painting, there is a bird and a pair of scissors. I thought, 'stripped down… featherless… de-plumed.' It struck me as a great word to represent an acoustic or 'unplugged' album, and also keep the whole 'bird/flying' theme we’ve perpetuated for years. Plus, the artistic continuity between both albums felt poetic."

== Release ==
de-plumed was released as a digital download on November 4, 2010 on the Choir's official website. The CD was released on November 9, 2010 on both the band’s website and their acoustic tour. It was later released for digital download on iTunes and is now widely available on various music streaming platforms.

== Tour ==
Daugherty and Hindalong toured as an acoustic duo in support of this album, playing these tracks and sharing stories from their years together as a band. "It's been great to get out there and share our music this way," Hindalong said. "For the most part, we've played 'home shows,' and we believe our songs come off well in intimate settings. Derri is singing better than ever these days, and I always enjoy getting into my bag of 'percussion tricks,' playing guitar and performing a song or two of my own. It's been satisfying to interact with people on a more personal level. The vulnerability factor is high, to be sure."

The acoustic approach allowed the Choir to perform songs they otherwise had not performed in concert before. "I’ve been surprised by 'Clouds,' from 1987," Hindalong said. "We had never played it in concert because we weren't confident we could pull it off as a live band. But strangely, it feels powerful as a duo. The words keep convicting me. It feels God-breathed, and I'm not one to say that about songs—almost never, really. Other than that, it's different every night." On the tour, some songs from Burning Like the Midnight Sun were performed exclusively at a single venue, like "It Should Have Been Obvious," along with Lost Dogs’ tracks, including "Wicked Guns."

For those unable to attend the live acoustic tour, the band streamed a special live concert from their studio on December 14, 2010, in which viewers could interact with band members.

== Critical reception ==
Professional ratings
Review scores
Source	Rating
HM	Favorable
Jesus Freak Hideout	4.5/5 stars
Apple Music	Favorable
Down The Line	Favorable

Critical reviews for de-plumed were favorable. Laura Love at Jesus Freak Hideout wrote that "hearing the band stripped down is a special treat. The music is more laid back than fans are used to, but it's never boring." Steve Ruff from Down The Line agreed, and pointed out that "[the Choir] didn’t just sing through these songs with an acoustic guitar. [Steve] Hindalong still handles a well favored and minimal approach to the percussion, and they have also added Matt Slocum on the cello which really embodies the richness of the acoustic melancholy of these songs." Apple Music's editorial review focused on the lyrical content, saying that "heard in this pristine form, the tunes can be more fully appreciated as deeply spiritual and compassionate meditations upon God, love, friendship and loss, told with insight and a touch of humor." Doug Van Pelt, writing for HM, was the most positive: "Intimate and vulnerable, the simple beauty of de-plumed proves that when you remove the placards of musical trends from each album, what truly remains are melody lines and songs that stand the test of time."

== Track listing ==
All songs written by Steve Hindalong and Derri Daugherty, unless otherwise specified.

No.	Title	Writer(s)	Originally released on	Length
1.	"Dreams"		Voices in Shadows	3:21
2.	"15 Doors"		Shades of Gray	2:31
3.	"Black Cloud"	Hindalong, Daugherty, Charlie Peacock	Diamonds and Rain	3:44
4.	"Clouds"	Hindalong, Daugherty, Steve Griffith	Chase the Kangaroo	4:19
5.	"To Bid Farewell"		Wide-Eyed Wonder	3:35
6.	"A Sentimental Song"		Circle Slide	4:47
7.	"Love Your Mind"	Hindalong, Daugherty, Tim Chandler	Kissers and Killers	4:26
8.	"Spring"	Hindalong, Daugherty, Chandler	Speckled Bird	3:55
9.	"Leprechaun"	Hindalong, Daugherty, Chandler	Free Flying Soul	2:40
10.	"Hey Gene"	Hindalong, Daugherty, Dan Michaels	Flap Your Wings	3:32
11.	"Enough To Love"		O How the Mighty Have Fallen	4:06
12.	"A Friend So Kind"		Burning Like the Midnight Sun	4:54
Total length:				45:50

== Personnel ==
Personnel taken from de-plumed liner notes.

The Choir

- Derri Daugherty – vocals, guitars
- Steve Hindalong – drums, percussion

Additional musicians

- Matt Slocum – cello

Production

- Dan Michaels - executive producer
- Derri Daugherty, Steve Hindalong - producers
- Derri Daugherty - recording and mixing
- Dave Schober - mastering
- Ron Lyon - cover painting
- Jimmy Abegg - design
