= Burning Like the Midnight Sun =

Studio album by the Choir
- Released: June 29, 2010
- Recorded: 2009–2010
- Studios: Sled Dog Studios, Franklin, Tennessee
- Genres: Alternative rock; indie rock
- Length: 49:31
- Label: Galaxy21
- Producers: Derri Daugherty; Steve Hindalong

The Choir chronology
O How the Mighty Have Fallen (2005)	Burning Like the Midnight Sun (2010)	de-plumed (2010)

Burning Like the Midnight Sun is the 12th studio release, and 11th full-length studio album, by alternative rock band the Choir, released in 2010.

== Background ==
In the five years that followed the release of O How the Mighty Have Fallen, the members of the Choir focused on other musical endeavors. Lead singer and guitarist Derri Daugherty and drummer and lyricist Steve Hindalong were concurrent members of the Christian "supergroup" Lost Dogs, so they recorded three albums with the group during this time: The Lost Cabin and the Mystery Trees (2006), We Like to Have Christmas (2007), and Old Angel (2010). The duo also co-produced the Christmas album The Dawn of Grace for Sixpence None the Richer in 2008. In addition, the two produced, engineered or contributed musically to projects for Jeff Johnson, Jeremy Camp, Circleslide, Leeland, Jadon Lavik and Mark Tedder. Guitarist Marc Byrd focused his attention on his post-rock band Hammock, which recorded and released three albums during this period, including Raising Your Voice Trying to Stop an Echo in 2006, which received highly positive critical reception. Bassist Tim Chandler contributed musically to two Lost Dogs albums, while saxophone and Lyricon player Dan Michaels continued to work in artist management, for MercyMe in particular.

During this period, Hindalong and Michaels continued to interact with Choir fans on the band’s own online message board. According to Michaels, it was Choir fans' repeated demands for new music that drove the band back into the studio to record a new album, which was entirely financed by Michaels himself. In addition, Byrd credited the new album to wanting to work with the other members of the band again. "The Choir is still making records because we're sick in a way; we can't just keep working on other people's records and strictly make music for a living. At the core, at the heart of every person in the Choir, there's an artist lurking there that just won't die and go away. It may take a few years to get it out there, but it's always being talked about. Why do we keep making records? Because it's fun. When everybody gets together, it's like synergy."

== Recording and production ==
Burning Like the Midnight Sun was the first of two successive albums to be recorded at Daugherty's own Sled Dog Studios in Franklin, Tennessee. Hindalong described these studio sessions as "smooth and satisfying." Daugherty had a slightly different perspective. "Choir records are not easy to make,” he said. “We’re not fighting, but we’re going at each other as far as musical ideas and what direction [to take]. We all have real strong opinions and real different styles. But in the end, we’ve found this great give-and-take within the band, with all of us, that seems to really work."

== Composition ==
=== Music ===
Much of the music on Burning Like the Midnight Sun was built upon guitar tracks that Daugherty was originally developing for a solo instrumental album. "The problem was, I kept putting down guitar ideas, and thought, 'This would make a good Choir song.' I would kind of go that direction, instead of my instrumental album direction, and now I have hardly anything for my instrumental album, and we have a Choir record. That was the catalyst for everything else that happened." Even with Daugherty's contributions, Hindalong emphasized that "perhaps more than any other album by the Choir, Burning Like the Midnight Sun integrates the musical personalities of all five individuals." Lloyd Epperly, writing for QRO, added that "it also might be time to make Christine Glass Byrd member number six," specifically highlighting her "immeasurable" contributions to "Mr. Chandler" and the title track.

"At this point, it’s real easy to create together, because we know where each other is going. [Steve] knows how I sing; he knows how to write for me to sing. I know if I play something on guitar, it’s going to bring something emotionally out in him."

— Derri Daugherty in 2010, in reference to Burning Like the Midnight Sun

For the album's mix of rock styles, Hindalong considered Explosions in the Sky to be "sonically inspirational," as well as the then-most recent releases by the National, Beach House and Grizzly Bear. The band also experimented with a more psychedelic sound on "I’m Sorry I Laughed." According to Hindalong, "I threw a thin blanket over my drums and played with mallets to get that muffled sound. Tim played bass thru a wah-wah pedal that I worked with my hands. We lifted the sax riff from our Chase the Kangaroo album. Dan's Lyricon was truly emotive on the outro, maybe his best since 'More than Words' from our Shades of Gray EP in '86." Hindalong also played around with unusual percussion on "A Friend So Kind." "Derri had already programmed a chillingly perfect loop," Hindalong said. "I just wanted to reinforce the backbeat with something metallic. So, I found a nail puller bar, decided to strike it with a screwdriver, and was really pleased how the note resonated in the key."

"It Should Have Been Obvious" was the only track to incorporate music created outside the band. "Max is my sixteen year-old son, and he's a high school football jock, but he also loves music, and he plays guitar and drums," Chandler said. "And one day he comes to me, he plays it for me, and it was very simple. It was a very simple G major chord that had some movement to it, and it just created this whole melody over it. And that launched the song for me once I heard that, because it was something I never would have played. Once he did that, it just developed into a thing where we collaborated on a chorus and a very simple bridge. I played the idea for Steve and Derri, and that's how that happened. The song would not have existed without [Max] starting it off."

=== Lyrics ===
A large percentage of songs on the album address specific events in the band members' lives ("Mr. Chandler," "I'm Sorry I Laughed," "Legend of Old Man Byrd," "Invisible," "Say Goodbye to Neverland"), while other tracks were inspired by close friends of the band ("A Friend So Kind," the title track), or Hindalong’s domestic life ("That Melancholy Ghost," "Between Bare Trees").

"Mr. Chandler" recounts an event 20 years prior when the Choir was at the airport on its way to perform in Canada, but was stymied by a misspelling on Chandler's paper ticket, as the name was printed "Kim" and not "Tim." "This was back in the days where you could show up with 2,000 pounds of equipment at LAX at the curb, and slip the skycap a hundred bucks or something, and he’d make sure the whole thing got on," Chandler recounted. Once he arrived at the ticket counter, the agent "had a fit" about the misspelling on the ticket, and was further agitated when Chandler had no pen on hand to sign a form. "It was so theatrical," he added. Afterwards, he and the rest of the band rushed to the gate, only to end up missing their flight.

"I’m Sorry I Laughed" details an incident during a soundcheck when the band was on tour in 1990. The stage at the St. Louis venue was long and narrow, and while warming up with his saxophone, Michaels fell off the stage. While he was unhurt, Michaels’ vintage 1963 Selmer was severely damaged, and the band was forced to perform several gigs without sax while it was being repaired. "I felt ashamed for laughing," Hindalong said. "Most humans, it seems, share the same dark trait – finding humor in the misfortunes of others. That seems to be the primary appeal of most reality TV. Why are the humiliation, ridicule and suffering of other people so entertaining to us?"

“Legend of Old Man Byrd” was a re-recording of a song Hindalong wrote and performed at Byrd’s 40th birthday party, and the song reflects actual details from Byrd’s personal life, including the “maple black guitar” which Hindalong gave him for his 30th birthday, later used to compose the popular worship song "God of Wonders." Byrd remarked that Hindalong’s song was "a little embarrassing for me. It’s the one track I didn’t play anything on, because I would feel funny playing on it."

"A Friend So Kind" was a musical eulogy to pianist Tom Howard, who had a long career in contemporary Christian music that began with his first album released on Larry Norman’s Solid Rock label in 1977. Whenever Hindalong was working on a project that required orchestration, he would call upon Howard, who soon became one of his dearest friends. When Hindalong heard the news of Howard’s sudden death, "I sat at home in the dark for about three days, and wrote this song on the third day. It was a painful loss, and still is, because I never had a kinder friend who saw me for who I was and accepted me, and had the courage to tell me the truth, without judgement, but with love. The kind of guy that almost everyone that knew him thought he was one of their best friends. I don't know how he had that time or energy for that many people, but he really did. And I thought, 'Wow, now that would be a divine aspiration to be a friend like Tom.'"

"I try to avoid polarizing debates of faith and politics; such conversations are more beneficial face-to-face between individuals with mutual respect for one another. My mind is not made up. I don’t think yours should be, either. Immensely more is hidden than is known. I believe God is alive and moving in our midst. If a song inspires listeners to ponder important things, then that’s a positive result."

— Steve Hindalong in 2011, regarding the album's lyrics

"It Should Have Been Obvious" mostly addresses slavery and racism, but it also serves as an apology to the LGBTQ+ community. "It should have been obvious that a Christian should not have owned slaves," Hindalong said. "But it wasn't to so many who professed to be 'Christians,' including many of our nation's founding fathers. So, what things, I wonder, are not obvious to us today that should be? For example, I kneel before the cross of my redeemer 'just as I am.' Surely, Jesus embraces our gay and lesbian brothers and sisters 'just as they are.' […] It saddens me that this is such a divisive subject. I have studied it intently and discussed it at length. I view the relative passages of Scripture differently now, given their cultural contexts. But mostly my heart and mind are changing as a result of a few individuals who I care for and have begun to understand. If I am wrong—and I am wrong about things every day—I'd rather err on the side of mercy. So often Christians show a cruel face, in shameful contrast to the merciful face of Christ, whose heart we are called to exemplify."

"Between Bare Trees," which Hindalong claimed was his favorite song on the album, was inspired by the love of nature that he shared with his then-wife, Nancy. "She can identify most trees by their bark, seed and leaf. Through her eyes I have learned to appreciate the structure and beauty of bare trees. And it brings to mind the importance of transparency in a relationship." At the same time, Hindalong admitted that, in revealing his domestic life, "sometimes I share too much. I don’t regret that personally, but it has been a problem for my wife, because Nancy’s a very private person, and has felt overexposed by it. And so, I have regretted that. I kind of steered clear of that this album; ‘Bare Trees’ is the only one."

== Artwork and packaging ==
The cover art was created by New Orleans–based visual artist R.R (Ron) Lyon. As a way to publicize the album, the band commissioned Lyon to create an original 24” x 24” art piece for each of the 11 songs on Burning Like the Midnight Sun. On October 16, 2010, the Choir performed a special concert at the Graphite Gallery in New Orleans to support the sale of the art pieces to the public.

== Release ==
Burning Like the Midnight Sun was released on July 29, 2010 on CD, and was initially only available on the band’s official website. It was later released for digital download on iTunes and is now widely available on various music streaming platforms.

Prior to release, the Choir offered a number of pre-order options, but their most notable was “Package A,” which included a VIP invitation for two to a barbeque and a private acoustic performance by the Choir at Michaels' home outside Nashville, Tennessee on July 24, 2010.

For all those who pre-ordered Burning Like the Midnight Sun, the Choir also included a companion CD that featured running commentary from all five band members for each song on the album. From this point forward, the Choir would provide band commentary (either on CD or digital download) for most of their new releases and reissued albums. In addition, the band provided a DVD of mix stems for listeners to create remixed versions of any song on the album. Several of these fan-made remixes would later be featured on the Choir's official Facebook page.

In 2012, Burning Like the Midnight Sun was briefly offered as a free download via NoiseTrade to publicize the release of The Loudest Sound Ever Heard.

== Critical reception ==
Professional ratings
Review scores
Source	Rating
Apple Music	Favorable
CCM Magazine	4/5 stars
Chicago Sun-Times	4/4 stars
Christianity Today	3/5 stars
Cross Rhythms	9/10 stars
Down the Line	Favorable
HM	Favorable
Jesus Freak Hideout	4.5/5 stars
The Phantom Tollbooth	4/5 stars
QRO Magazine	8.1/10

Burning Like the Midnight Sun received some of the highest acclaim for any album in the band's catalog, both at the time of release and retrospectively. Jeff Elbel, writing for the Spin Control column in the Chicago Sun-Times, called the album "a late-career triumph," and remarked that Burning Like the Midnight Sun was the Choir’s "second exceptional album in a row, and its best since 1990's landmark Circle Slide." Christianity Today′s Andrew Greer also praised the album, saying that "the Grammy-nominated indie rockers plunge headfirst into lyrical provocations of love, loss and the gospel, issuing smooth musical clarity to contrast the murky exploration of everyday faith." Andy Argyrakis, writing for CCM Magazine, said the Choir upheld its "pioneer status" as "one of alternative music's most meaningful and seminal acts" with "entrancing rhythms, dreamy arrangements, thought-provoking lyrics and overall attention to artistic detail." Derek Walter at The Phantom Tollbooth also highlighted the production, calling Burning Like the Midnight Sun a "sonic delight" and the Choir's "most cohesive, melodic and atmospheric collection to date," adding that the album also contains "vibrantly visual lyrics full of poetry and insight."

Matt Connor at HM called Burning Like the Midnight Sun "another solid LP," specifically highlighting Dan Michaels' saxophone contributions as a "real gem," adding that, "not only does the mix strongly support his efforts, but it surprisingly fits into every track—a feat unto itself." Editor Steve Ruff, writing for Down the Line, also called the disc "solid throughout," with "warmth that is full-flavored and dense, with texture and layers." He highlighted both Daugherty's voice, which he described as containing a "gentle fragility," and Hindalong's percussion, with its "unique delivery and perception." In QRO Magazine, writer Lloyd Epperly also praised the album's production, claiming that Midnight Sun mines "similar sonic textures as the Church and Cocteau Twins," and added that "it's as if all the pieces came together this time." Michael Weaver of Jesus Freak Hideout agreed, writing that Burning Like the Midnight Sun is "easily one of the Choir's best albums, if not their best to date," while Cross Rhythms contributor Lins Honeyman simply called the album "[an] exemplary release."

Retrospectively, Apple Music's editorial review said that "Derri Daugherty remains a uniquely evocative singer, bringing a spacey sort of tenderness to Steve Hindalong’s spiritually informed lyrics," and that "the Choir’s subtle layering of effects-laden guitars, pulsating percussion and moody saxophones achieves a gorgeous shimmer."

== Track listing ==
All lyrics by Steve Hindalong. All music by Derri Daugherty and Steve Hindalong, except where noted.

No.	Title	Music	Length
1.	"Midnight Sun"		4:06
2.	"That Melancholy Ghost"		4:44
3.	"Mr. Chandler"		5:40
4.	"Between Bare Trees"		4:15
5.	"A Friend So Kind"		6:18
6.	"Legend of Old Man Byrd"		5:03
7.	"I'm Sorry I Laughed"		3:26
8.	"The Word Inside the Word"		3:49
9.	"It Should Have Been Obvious"	Max Chandler, Tim Chandler, Hindalong	4:17
10.	"Invisible"	Tim Chandler, Hindalong	3:08
11.	"Say Goodbye to Neverland"		4:45
Total length:			49:31

Band Commentary (CD disc 2)
No.	Title	Length
1.	"Midnight Sun [Band Commentary]"	4:06
2.	"That Melancholy Ghost [Band Commentary]"	4:44
3.	"Mr. Chandler [Band Commentary]"	5:42
4.	"Between Bare Trees [Band Commentary]"	4:17
5.	"A Friend So Kind [Band Commentary]"	6:20
6.	"Legend of Old Man Byrd [Band Commentary]"	5:05
7.	"I'm Sorry I Laughed [Band Commentary]"	3:28
8.	"The Word Inside the Word [Band Commentary]"	3:51
9.	"It Should Have Been Obvious [Band Commentary]"	4:19
10.	"Invisible [Band Commentary]"	3:09
11.	"Say Goodbye to Neverland [Band Commentary]"	4:59
Total length:		49:59

Mix Stems (DVD)
No.	Title	Length
1.	"A Friend So Kind [Stems]"
2.	"Bare Trees [Stems]"
3.	"I'm Sorry [Stems]"
4.	"Invisible [Stems]"
5.	"It Should Have Been Obvious [Stems]"
6.	"Melancholy Ghost [Stems]"
7.	"Midnight Sun [Stems]"
8.	"Mr. Chandler [Stems]"
9.	"Neverland [Stems]"
10.	"Old Man Byrd [Stems]"
11.	"Word Inside the Word [Stems]"

== Personnel ==
Personnel taken from Burning Like the Midnight Sun liner notes.

The Choir

- Derri Daugherty – vocals, guitars
- Steve Hindalong – drums, percussion
- Tim Chandler – bass guitar
- Dan Michaels – saxophone, Lyricon
- Marc Byrd – guitars

Additional musicians

- Christine Glass Byrd – vocals

Production

- Dan Michaels – executive producer
- Derri Daugherty – producer, recording engineer, mixer
- Steve Hindalong – producer
- Jim DeMain – mastering at Yesmaster
- Ron Lyon – cover painting
- Andrew Thompson – layout and design
