= Love Songs and Prayers: A Retrospective =

Compilation album by The Choir
- Released: November 13, 1995
- Recorded: 1985–1994
- Genres: Alternative rock; Christian alternative rock
- Length: 78:32
- Label: Myrrh/Epic
- Producers: Derri Daugherty; Steve Hindalong; Mark Heard; Charlie Peacock

The Choir chronology
Speckled Bird (1994)	Love Songs and Prayers: A Retrospective (1995)	Free Flying Soul (1996)

Love Songs and Prayers: A Retrospective is the first compilation album from alternative rock band the Choir, released in 1995.

== Background ==
When the Choir was contacted by Myrrh Records about releasing a "best of" collection, the band requested to choose the songs themselves, and the label agreed. The organization of the songs into "love songs and prayers" was suggested by saxophone and Lyricon player Dan Michaels when he heard drummer and lyricist Steve Hindalong use that term in an interview to describe the Choir’s body of work.

Although released by Myrrh, the compilation chronologically presents songs from all their releases, regardless of record label, up to that point. The unreleased alternate versions of "A Million Years" and "All Night Long" were originally recorded in 1985 with producer Mark Heard after Michaels had joined the band, and appear for the first time on this collection.

The digipack CD case was designed by singer Christine Glass (using the name "Christy Coxe" in her role as art director). She would eventually record backup vocals for the Choir on a consistent basis beginning with 2000's Flap Your Wings. Her husband, Marc Byrd, would subsequently join the band in 2005.

== Critical reception ==
Professional ratings
Review scores
Source	Rating
Cross Rhythms	7/10 stars
AllMusic	3/5 stars

At the time of its release, Love Songs and Prayers was well-received. Sam Hargreaves, writing for Cross Rhythms said “the quality of the songwriting progresses through the album, and the lyrics are consistently good.”

Retrospectively, Darryl Cater at AllMusic praised the “great deal of variety” on the compilation, and added that “the result of this interesting mix is (and has always been) a sense of persistent hopefulness in the face of darkness.”

== Track listing ==
All songs written by Steve Hindalong and Derri Daugherty, unless otherwise specified.

No.	Title	Writer(s)	Originally released on	Length
1.	"A Million Years (alternate version)"		Previously unreleased	3:31
2.	"All Night Long (alternate version)"		Previously unreleased	5:19
3.	"Render Love"	Hindalong, Charlie Peacock	Diamonds and Rain	5:12
4.	"Black Cloud"	Hindalong, Peacock	Diamonds and Rain	3:40
5.	"Consider"	Hindalong, Daugherty, Tim Chandler	Chase the Kangaroo	4:06
6.	"Sad Face (edit version)"	Hindalong, Daugherty, Chandler	Previously unreleased	4:52
7.	"So Far Away"		Chase the Kangaroo	4:51
8.	"Clouds"	Hindalong, Daugherty, Steve Griffith	Chase the Kangaroo	6:05
9.	"To Bid Farewell"		Wide-Eyed Wonder	4:37
10.	"Car, Etc. (special radio mix)"		Previously unreleased	4:33
11.	"Merciful Eyes"		Circle Slide	4:55
12.	"Restore My Soul"		Circle Slide	6:34
13.	"A Sentimental Song"		Circle Slide	5:01
14.	"Like a Cloud"		Speckled Bird	2:06
15.	"Gripped"		Speckled Bird	4:21
16.	"Grace"		Speckled Bird	3:08
17.	"Live Postlude"		Previously unreleased	1:08
Total length:				78:32

== Personnel ==
Personnel taken from Love Songs and Prayers: A Retrospective liner notes.

The Choir

- Derri Daugherty – lead vocals, guitars, bass guitar, producer
- Steve Hindalong – drums, percussion, producer
- Tim Chandler – bass guitar, vocals
- Dan Michaels – saxophone, Lyricon

Additional musicians

- Bill Batstone – guitar, bass guitar ("A Million Years," "All Night Long," "Render Love," "Black Cloud")
- Robin Spurs – bass guitar, vocals ("To Bid Farewell," "Car, Etc.")
- Mike Sauerbrey – bass guitar ("Restore My Soul")
- Mark Heard – background vocals ("About Love")
- Jerry Chamberlain – background vocals ("Merciful Eyes")
- Sharon McCall – background vocals ("A Sentimental Song")

Production

- Ken Love – digital editing and mastering
- Christy Coxe – art direction
- Norma Jean Roy – photography
- Astrid Herbold – design
