= Voices in Shadows =

1985 studio album by the Choir

Studio album by Youth Choir
- Released: October 1985
- Recorded: 1985
- Studios: Whitefield Studios, Santa Ana, California
- Genres: Alternative rock; Christian alternative rock
- Length: 37:16
- Label: Broken
- Producer: Thom Roy

Youth Choir chronology
Voices in Shadows (1985)	Shades of Gray (1986)

Singles from Voices in Shadows
- 1. "A Million Years" Released: June 5, 1985; 2. "Someone's Calling" Released: June 5, 1985

Voices in Shadows is the first studio album by alternative rock band the Choir (known as "Youth Choir" at this point), released in 1985.

== Background ==
Youth Choir was part of a group of Christian alternative rock bands, primarily based out of Orange County, California, that got their start under the aegis of Calvary Chapel. Drummer Steve Hindalong originally met bass guitarist Tim Chandler while playing in a jazz combo together at Azusa Pacific University; not long afterward, Chandler introduced Hindalong to lead singer and guitarist Derri Daugherty, who was working as the house engineer for Maranatha! Music's Whitefield Studios. The three began writing music together, which resulted in the song, "It's So Wonderful," later released as part of the What's Shakin' compilation of Maranatha! Christian alternative rock bands in 1984. Through Daugherty's connections to Daniel Amos, Chandler met Terry Taylor, and accepted Taylor's request to join that band during the recording of Doppelgänger, so Hindalong and Daugherty recruited Mike Sauerbrey to replace Chandler as bassist. The name "Youth Choir" was originally suggested by Taylor, and the new trio liked the term, as they were fans of Sonic Youth and Choir Invisible. In March 1984, Youth Choir was asked to be part of the initial Cornerstone Festival later that summer; the band quickly pressed up a 7" single of two live tracks, "I Can't Take It," and "Here in the Night," to have something to offer attendees besides the What's Shakin' compilation. Youth Choir was later signed to Broken Records, a division of Maranatha!.

== Recording and production ==
Youth Choir returned to Whitefield Studios to record their debut. Derri Daugherty wanted Terry Taylor to produce the record, but Broken recommended producer Thom Roy, who had co-produced ¡Alarma! for Daniel Amos and produced the debut album for the Lifesavors. Of the three songs Youth Choir had previously released, Roy opted only to re-record "Here in the Night" for Voices in Shadows. The remainder of the tracks—and in particular, the lyrics—were primarily written by Daugherty; starting with Shades of Gray, Steve Hindalong would assume almost all lyrical duties from that point forward. Due to budget limitations, the album was recorded at off-peak hours, and Daugherty and Mike Sauerbrey recorded their tracks over a basic drum machine, with the assumption that Hindalong would replace the machine with live drums. Unfortunately, the budget didn't allow for more than cymbal crashes and the sound of a hubcab being thrown across the studio floor during the instrumental break of "Someone's Calling." Roy referred to Youth Choir's early style as the "San Francisco Sound," but the band's influences at this time were primarily British, being described by one critic as "The Cure on Prozac."

== Release ==
Prior to the album's release, Youth Choir convinced the label brass to let them re-record "A Million Years" as a full band, with Mark Heard as producer, Bill Batstone on bass and including newly-hired Dan Michaels on Lyricon, before issuing that single to Christian radio. While in the studio with Heard, Youth Choir also re-recorded "Another World" as well as two new tracks: "We Should Be Dancing," and an early version of "All Night Long," the latter of which would be recorded again for the Shades of Gray EP. The re-recorded versions of "A Million Years" and "All Night Long" would officially be released on the compilation album Love Songs and Prayers: A Retrospective in 1995, with the other two tracks appearing on the "Nevermind the Extras" disc in the Choir's Never Say Never: The First 20 Years boxed set in 2000.

"A Million Years" was released to Christian radio in June of 1985 but did not chart. However, Youth Choir’s other single was the leadoff track "Someone’s Calling," which became the band’s first top ten hit on the CCM Rock charts, peaking at #8. Voices in Shadows was then released in October 1985 on the two primary audio formats at that time, vinyl and cassette. The album was later re-released on CD in 2000 together with the Shades of Gray EP.

=== 2024 re-release ===
In October of 2024, the band re-released Voices in Shadows as a digital download on the Choir's Bandcamp page, which included seven bonus tracks. The album, later dubbed "Deluxe Edition," was made widely available on music streaming services in July of 2025.

== Critical reception ==
Professional ratings
Review scores
Source	Rating
Contemporary Christian Magazine	Unfavorable
Musicline	Favorable
Red Deer Advocate	4/4 stars
AllMusic	2.5/5 stars
Jesus Freak Hideout	3.5/5 stars
The Phantom Tollbooth	Favorable
CrossRhythms	8/10 stars

At the time of the album's release, CCM Magazine (during its brief run as the retitled Contemporary Christian Magazine) did not do a formal review of Voices in Shadows, but included a brief overview of the album as part of a special section entitled "New Faces in Music." Writer Scott Pinzon was critical of Youth Choir's first effort, saying the album "lacks variety, so the tunes tend to blend." Including the Imitators’ first EP in his assessment, Pinzon wrote that, "both bands suffer from low budgets, relatively inexperienced producers, and heavy-handed lyrics." Contemporary Christian Magazine′s sister publication Musicline was far more charitable. Reviewer Brian Quincy Newcomb called the "Flock of Seagulls- and Police-influenced" album "a fine debut," saying that the trio of Daugherty, Hindalong and Sauerbrey "have captured a sound that is vital and interesting, while speaking with sincerity and sensitivity." Martin Smith, writing for the Red Deer Advocate, agreed, calling Voices in Shadows "a masterful bit of atmospheric new wave seasoned with dashes of rambling guitar and rolling drums." He highlighted "Why Are All the Children Crying" as the centerpiece of the album, saying "it goes beyond the let's-send-money approach of Live-Aid, and examines our attitudes towards children, be they in Ethiopia or Los Angeles." Smith would later select Voices in Shadows as the No. 5 contemporary Christian album of 1985.

Retrospective critical reaction has also been more favorable. Mark Allender at AllMusic called Youth Choir's debut a "nice effort" with "creative guitar work," and added that, "on its own merit [...] this release can be disappointing, but taken in the context of [the Choir's] later work, one can get a taste of the seeds that brought out their later successes." In a review of the 2000 CD reissue of Voices in Shadows and Shades of Gray, Michial Farmer at The Phantom Tollbooth said, "while the band’s early material never quite reached the magnitude of such classics as Circle Slide and Speckled Bird, there are quite a few excellent songs," and highlighted "Someone's Calling" as "an excellent minor-key rocker." Mike Rimmer at CrossRhythms expressed similar sentiments, saying that "these recordings [are] very much a product of their age," but clarified that the album reflected "the embryonic traits that [made] their later recordings so evocative." Wayne Myatt at Jesus Freak Hideout pointed out similar dichotomies, saying that "some of the songs seem to drag on too much with a chorus that doesn't ease the anticipation of a recovery such as "Another World," "Dreams," and "Why Are All The Children Crying." At the same time, however, the record also contains some truly classic tunes that you will want to play again and again." Myatt praised the lead single "A Million Years" in particular as "a great, timeless ballad." Mark Allan Powell in the Encyclopedia of Contemporary Christian Music agreed, writing that, "the group basically had its trademark sound down from the first album on; [...] the album opens ("Someone's Calling") and closes ("A Million Years") with its best tracks."

=== Accolades ===
- Red Deer Advocate
  - No. 5 Contemporary Christian Album of the Year (1985)

== Track listing ==
All songs written by Derri Daugherty, unless otherwise specified.

Side one
No.	Title	Writer(s)	Length
1.	"Someone's Calling"		4:27
2.	"Wounds of a Young Heart"	Brian Healy, Derri Daugherty, Steve Hindalong	2:38
3.	"Dreams"	Daugherty, Hindalong	3:48
4.	"Another Heart"	Daugherty, Mike Sauerbrey	3:32
5.	"Why Are All the Children Crying"		4:31

Side two
No.	Title	Writer(s)	Length
1.	"Another World"	Daugherty, Sauerbrey, Hindalong	3:54
2.	"Here in the Night"		4:17
3.	"Alright Tonight"		2:54
4.	"Anyone But You"		3:34
5.	"A Million Years"	Daugherty, Hindalong	3:41
Total length:			37:16

2024 Deluxe Edition bonus tracks
No.	Title	Writer(s)	Length
1.	"Render Love (Re-Recorded 2021)"	Hindalong, Charlie Peacock	4:35
2.	"I Can’t Take It"		2:13
3.	"We Should Be Dancing"		3:07
4.	"Another World (Re-Recorded)"	Daugherty, Sauerbrey, Hindalong	3:50
5.	"All Night Long (Re-Recorded)"	Daugherty, Hindalong	5:18
6.	"A Million Years (Re-Recorded)"	Daugherty, Hindalong	3:53
7.	"It’s So Wonderful"		1:54
Total length:			62:06

== Personnel ==
Personnel taken from Voices in Shadows liner notes.

Youth Choir

- Derri Daugherty – guitars, vocals
- Steve Hindalong – drums, vocals, percussion
- Mike Sauerbrey – bass guitar

Production

- Thom Roy – producer, engineer
- Dave Hackbarth - engineer (live sound)
- Bob Salcedo, Tim Curiel - crew
- Ed McTaggart - design (sleeve)
- Kevin Short - design, layout, illustration (photo)
- Scott Lockwood - photography
- Linda Baley - photography (back cover)
