= The Loudest Sound Ever Heard =

Studio album by The Choir
- Released: May 15, 2012
- Recorded: 2012
- Studios: Neverland Studios, Franklin, Tennessee; The Brown Owl, Berry Hill, Tennessee
- Genres: Alternative rock; indie rock
- Length: 44:37
- Label: Galaxy21
- Producers: Derri Daugherty; Steve Hindalong

The Choir chronology
de-plumed (2010)	The Loudest Sound Ever Heard (2012)	Peace, Love & Light (2013)

The Loudest Sound Ever Heard is the 14th studio release, and 13th full-length studio album, by alternative rock band the Choir, released in 2012.

== Background ==
After a busy 2010 with the release of two full-length albums followed by a short tour, the members of the Choir pursued other musical endeavors during the subsequent two years.

Lead singer and guitarist Derri Daugherty finally completed the ambient music project he originally started in 2009, before the majority of his initial tracks ended up comprising a large portion of the music for the Choir's Burning Like the Midnight Sun in 2010. Released under the nom de plume Clouds Echo in Blue, this self-titled collection of new instrumentals was released in 2011. Daugherty also partnered with Michael Roe of the 77s on an Americana side project that officially coalesced into the duo Kerosene Halo, which also released its first, self-titled, album in 2011.

Drummer and lyricist Steve Hindalong focused his attention on producing, with his most notable work being Sara Groves' highly successful and critically-acclaimed album Invisible Empires. Hindalong also produced four tracks for Nate Marialke's 2011 album Your Kingdom Come.

Bass guitarist Tim Chandler contributed to the soundtrack for Terry Scott Taylor's graphic novel Return to the Neverhood, which was released in 2012. Chandler's work in the side project Boy-O-Boy in 1984, recorded with fellow Daniel Amos guitarist Jerry Chamberlain, was finally independently released in 2011 under the title Giants of Pop.

Guitarist Marc Byrd spent this period focused primarily on recording the double album Departure Songs with his post-rock band Hammock. Saxophone and Lyricon player Dan Michaels continued his work in artist management for the Choir, MercyMe and other contemporary Christian artists, in addition to running his independent Galaxy21 record label with his wife, Lisa.

== Recording and production ==
The Choir recorded this album in "fits and starts as time allowed. Daugherty would work on his guitar parts while holed up in his condo; Hindalong tracked drum parts in two studios with Daugherty engineering." These included Daugherty's own Neverland Studios as well as the Brown Owl in Berry Hill, Tennessee. Hindalong took advantage of the latter studio's extensive resources to expand his mid-1960s Rogers drum kit with other percussion instruments, including double floor toms, a 24-inch Gretsch kick drum and a brass "Black Beauty" snare drum.

Michaels purchased a new Lyricon to play on this album, while Daugherty recorded tracks with two new guitars: an Italia that he had acquired at that year's NAMM Show in Anaheim, California, and an Ovation electric guitar called a Deacon, which he described as "something Gene Simmons would use," due to its hatchet-like shape. Daugherty was inspired by Robert Smith's use of that latter guitar on Siouxsie and the Banshees' Hyæna record, so he went out and purchased one of his own prior to this album's recording sessions.

Because of his work with Hammock, Byrd’s participation on this album was limited only to contributing high-pitched ambient guitar textures to three tracks: "Cross That River," "Laughter of Heaven" and "Melodious." Even so, his wife Christine Glass Byrd supplied background vocals, as she had done for two prior Choir albums. Other guest musicians on The Loudest Sound Ever Heard included cellist Matt Slocum from Sixpence None the Richer, who was a major contributor to the Choir's acoustic album de-plumed and who would become a regular guest on subsequent records by the band. Fellow Sixpence lead singer Leigh Nash also performed a duet with Daugherty on the closing track, "After All." Like Slocum, she would also show up regularly on future recordings by the Choir.

When asked about the band's long independent status, Hindalong confirmed that this creative freedom allowed The Loudest Sound Ever Heard to be recorded with no commercial goal in mind, but simply because the Choir enjoyed creating music together. This would be the final Choir album to be completely financed by Michaels. After this, the band would turn to crowdsourcing to fund all future releases, starting with their next studio album, Shadow Weaver.

== Composition ==
=== Music ===
"There’s a confidence that comes with age. You know what you like and you know what you do, and you know what you do well. If you continue to do those things, then chances are, you can continue to make pretty good music."

— Derri Daugherty in 2012, in reference to The Loudest Sound Ever Heard

Most of the songs on The Loudest Sound Ever Heard were written after Daugherty had developed various guitar melodies and tones, which then prompted Hindalong to compose lyrics based on his emotional responses to these tracks. However, the Choir also decided to book a rehearsal studio where they could get together as a band for jam sessions—very similar to how they approached the recording of 1988's Chase the Kangaroo. Two songs came out of this process: "Laughter of Heaven" and "Takin' the Universe In." The album’s final track, "After All," was based upon the instrumental track "My Imaginary Friend" from Daugherty’s ambient solo release Clouds Echo in Blue.

Members of the Choir also acknowledged a number of musical influences throughout this album, from Motown-inspired guitar on the opening track, "Strange Girl," to the "Beatles chord" that closes out "Melodious." Even Chandler admitted that he "ripped off the bass part from 'Walk on the Wild Side' for the first verse" of "A World Away."

Michaels’ saxophone is heavily featured on this album, although ironically, it was the last element of the album to be recorded. While the majority of his contributions implemented his 1963 Selmer Mark VI tenor sax, the song "Takin' the Universe In" uses a Lyricon with a sampler to imitate the sound of a baritone sax. Michaels was later surprised when listening to the final master recording, as his experimentation was captured without his knowledge and ended up becoming "the loudest thing in the mix."

=== Lyrics ===
Much of the lyrical content on the album was influenced by Hindalong's recent sobriety, after 20 years of struggling with alcohol addiction. In the year prior to the recording of this album, he had joined a 12-step program at his church, and Hindalong claimed that this experience led to a strengthened marriage and deeper connection to God. Key songs that explored these themes included "Learning to Fly," "Cross That River," "Laughter of Heaven," "A World Away," and "Takin' the Universe In." As was typical for Choir albums, Hindalong's lyrics also addressed his domestic life ("Strange Girl," "O How") and his friendships inside the band ("Melodious").

"Our capacity to comprehend invisible realities is limited. Biblical scholars, both devout and cynical, have argued divisively for centuries and will never agree. In the end, proud religion is delusion, continuously motivated by a desire for power and control. So it seems to me that divine mystery should be embraced instead."

— Steve Hindalong, in an interview with Christianity Today in 2012

Because of the weighty themes explored on the album, the Choir opted to kick off the record with a "pop song" rather than one of their moody compositions, as had become typical for the band. The lyrics for "Strange Girl" were inspired by a remark that one of Hindalong's daughters made about a friend whom she considered "weird." By contrast, Hindalong thought her friend was "strange, in a good way." "There's so many expectations on women to be a certain way," he said. "As a father of daughters, I've always encouraged [them] to be strange, be different, be unique, be yourself. You don't have to be what society expects you to be, or what any man expects you to be."

That parental concern for one's children was addressed most directly in "O How." "I have some close friends whose child was in the hospital—a little, young toddler—and there's no pain like that, there's no soul ache," Hindalong said. "You find out when you become a parent what it's like to be vulnerable. You find out, really, what the word 'love' means. It's an insight into God's unconditional love for us. Any parent would relate to this song." Daugherty agreed. "As a parent, you watch your kids getting older, and with every age, there's a different set of worries that you have," he added.

Alongside his recovery process, Hindalong worked with his church's outreach to the homeless, and after spending the better part of one night volunteering, he found himself in a Trader Joe's parking lot, waiting for the store to open to get some coffee. This inspired the lyrics for "Takin' the Universe In," and he started writing them out while he was still in his car. "I just felt so grateful, realizing all I have," Hindalong said. "A lot of people have lost a lot; a lot are less fortunate."

While the lyrics on this album address Christian themes more directly than some of the Choir's prior recordings, Hindalong preferred to avoid dogmatic statements and focus on the universal importance of love and mercy, particularly in songs like "A World Away," and the closing track, "After All." "Who 'understands' God, anyway?" he asked. "Even in the afterlife—which I hesitate to imagine—I don't suppose all will be revealed, even in the glow of our Savior's face. I anticipate instead an eternity of astonishing discovery. So, I've been learning to keep things simpler when it comes to my faith."

== Artwork and packaging ==
To inspire the cover design, Hindalong sent the lyrics of "Learning to Fly"—which contains the phrase "the loudest sound ever heard," in reference to the volcanic eruption of Krakatoa—to photographer Chris Knight. In response, he created and photographed a sculpture and miniature that in his mind captured the essence of the song, which served as the central theme of the album.

== Release ==
To tease the upcoming release of The Loudest Sound Ever Heard, a rough mix of "The Forest" was made available to those who pre-ordered the album. The full album was released on May 15, 2012 as a CD exclusively on the band's website. It was later released for digital download on iTunes and is now widely available on various music streaming platforms.

All those who pre-ordered The Loudest Sound Ever Heard also received a companion CD that featured running commentary for each song on the album from Daugherty, Hindalong, Chandler and Michaels. In addition, the Choir provided a DVD of mix stems for listeners to create remixed versions of any song on the album. A number of these fan-made remixes were later posted on the band's official Facebook page.

Also prior to release, The Loudest Sound Ever Heard received a significant publicity boost. A high-profile interview with Hindalong was featured in Christianity Today, which discussed his year of sobriety along with its impact on his Christian faith and the recording of this album.

On July 22, 2012, Daugherty, Hindalong, Chandler and Michaels went back into the studio to record, produce, mix and finish an entire song in one day. This was part of an exclusive weekend event for a limited group of fans who traveled from all over the U.S. and Canada to participate. The resultant "Shadow of the Cross" was later released on August 8, 2012 as a digital single.

In 2015, to publicize their Circle Slide 25th Anniversary Tour, the Choir briefly offered The Loudest Sound Ever Heard as a free download via NoiseTrade.

== Tour ==
While the Choir did tour in 2012, it was not in direct support of The Loudest Sound Ever Heard. Instead, selected songs from this album were played at the end of the setlist on the band's Chase the Kangaroo 25th anniversary tour, which featured the Choir playing that album live in its entirety.

== Critical reception ==
Professional ratings
Review scores
Source	Rating
Christianity Today	4/5 stars
CCM Magazine	4/5 stars
Apple Music	Favorable
Cross Rhythms	8/10 stars
HM	Favorable
Jesus Freak Hideout	4.5/5 stars
The Phantom Tollbooth	4/5 stars
Down the Line	Favorable
Indie Vision Music	Mixed

Critical reception for The Loudest Sound Ever Heard was highly favorable. John Wilson from Christianity Today praised the album for recalling "the dark, Euro six-string vibe of latter '80s underground rock [...] a very good thing made even better by hooky melodies, crackling musicianship, and Steve Hindalong's better-than-ever lyrics." The editorial review from Apple Music was also positive, saying that the Choir "delves into matters of faith, friendship, and mortality with clear-eyed compassion," and "displays an honesty and humanity in its music that makes cosmic-scale themes seem like personal confessions." Steve Ruff's enthusiastic review in Down the Line said that "the album could be released as an instrumental and be just as powerful." He added, "there is a sense of nature that is revealed in these songs, both physical and spiritual nature that is united, conveyed and intertwined in a beautiful ambience." Tincan Caldwell at Jesus Freak Hideout called The Loudest Sound Ever Heard "a thinking-person's pop album. Psychedelia for the spirit, pop-angst, a twelve-step inspired sighing of the spirit with a little rambunctiousness on the side." At the same time, Caldwell pointed out that the album was "a more introspective experience than the [...] title might suggest. As a matter of fact, it's not 'til half-way through the project [...] that we get to hear more typical pop tempos and hooks."

This aspect of the album fueled a more critical review from Josh Hamm at Indie Vision Music, where he wrote that "the album never really takes off. While every song is solid, there are none which truly take the album to the next level." Bert Saraco's otherwise positive review at The Phantom Tollbooth included a similar caveat: "Taken as the third piece of an excellent series of recent albums, The Loudest Sound Ever Heard is a masterful third movement of theme and subject matter, with music that reflects the somber thoughts laid out. It is, perhaps, not the place to start for new listeners." However, Doug Van Pelt at HM strongly differed by declaring that the Choir "turn in one of their best collection of tunes here," and added that "highlights are hard to pick, because it's such a good listen from beginning to end."\

== Track listing ==
All lyrics by Steve Hindalong. All music by Derri Daugherty and Steve Hindalong, unless otherwise specified.

Standard edition (CD)
No.	Title	Music	Length
1.	"Strange Girl"		3:27
2.	"Learning to Fly"		3:51
3.	"Cross That River"		6:24
4.	"Laughter of Heaven"	Dan Michaels, Daugherty, Hindalong, Tim Chandler	4:47
5.	"O How"		4:03
6.	"The Forest"		4:35
7.	"Takin' the Universe In"	Michaels, Daugherty, Hindalong, Chandler	4:31
8.	"Melodious"		3:14
9.	"A World Away"		4:37
10.	"After All" (with Leigh Nash)		5:08
Total length:			44:37

Bonus track (digital single)
No.	Title	Length
11.	"Shadow of the Cross"	4:06
Total length:		48:43

Band Commentary (CD disc 2)
No.	Title	Length
1.	"Strange Girl [Band Commentary]"	3:49
2.	"Learning to Fly [Band Commentary]"	5:10
3.	"Cross That River [Band Commentary]"	6:24
4.	"Laughter of Heaven [Band Commentary]"	4:47
5.	"O How [Band Commentary]"	4:03
6.	"The Forest [Band Commentary]"	4:35
7.	"Takin' the Universe In [Band Commentary]"	5:38
8.	"Melodious [Band Commentary]"	3:16
9.	"A World Away [Band Commentary]"	4:37
10.	"After All [Band Commentary]"	5:08
Total length:		47:27

Mix Stems (DVD)
No.	Title	Length
1.	"A World Away [Stems]"
2.	"After All [Stems]"
3.	"Cross That River [Stems]"
4.	"Forest for the Trees [Stems]"
5.	"Laughter of Heaven [Stems]"
6.	"Learning to Fly [Stems]"
7.	"Melodious [Stems]"
8.	"Oh How [Stems]"
9.	"Strange Girl [Stems]"
10.	"Takin' the Universe In [Stems]"

== Personnel ==
Personnel taken from The Loudest Sound Ever Heard liner notes.

The Choir

- Derri Daugherty - guitars, vocals
- Steve Hindalong - drums, glockenspiel, tambourine, shaker
- Tim Chandler - bass
- Dan Michaels - lyricon, saxophones
- Marc Byrd - guitar

Additional musicians

- Christine Glass Byrd - background vocals
- Leigh Nash - vocals, "After All"
- Matt Slocum - cello

Production

- The Choir - producers
- Derri Daugherty, Stephen Leiweke, Andrew Thompson, Matt Slocum - recording
- Mark "Z" Zellmer - recording assistance
- Derri Daugherty - mixing
- Jim DeMain - mastering
- Andrew Thompson - layout and design
- Chris Knight - photography
