= Peace, Love & Light =

EP by The Choir
- Released: November 27, 2013
- Recorded: 2013
- Studios: Neverland Studios, Franklin, Tennessee
- Genres: Christmas music; alternative rock
- Length: 16:00
- Label: Galaxy21
- Producers: Derri Daugherty; Steve Hindalong

The Choir chronology
The Loudest Sound Ever Heard (2012)	Peace, Love & Light (2013)	Shadow Weaver (2014)

Peace, Love & Light is the 15th studio release, second EP, and first digital-only album by alternative rock band the Choir, released on November 27, 2013. This is also the band's first Christmas-themed release. As a "stretch goal" in the Choir's Kickstarter campaign for their 2014 album Shadow Weaver, this EP was provided exclusively to funders who pledged $60 or more.

The five tracks are a mix of traditional carols, the Christmas standard "Baby, It's Cold Outside" and the title track, which is an original composition by Steve Hindalong and Derri Daugherty. The Apple Music version also includes "Babe in the Straw," the Choir's 2010 re-recording of a song they wrote for Caedmon's Call to perform on City on a Hill: It's Christmas Time in 2002.

== Critical reception ==
Professional ratings
Review scores
Source	Rating
Jesus Freak Hideout	4/5 stars

Writing for Jesus Freak Hideout, Alex Caldwell praised the album, saying, "it's a testament to the quality offered here on Peace, Love and Light that five songs leave you wanting more," and added that, "another Christmas EP next year from these veterans would be a nice present indeed."

== Track listing ==
Standard edition (Digital album)
No.	Title	Writer(s)	Length
1.	"I Saw Three Ships"	Traditional	2:32
2.	"In the Bleak Midwinter"	Christina Rossetti, Gustav Holst	3:44
3.	"Away in a Manger"	Traditional	3:07
4.	"Baby, It's Cold Outside" (duet with Leigh Nash)	Frank Loesser	3:37
5.	"Peace, Love & Light"	Steve Hindalong, Derri Daugherty	3:00
Total length:			16:00

Apple Music bonus track
No.	Title	Writer(s)	Length
6.	"Babe in the Straw"	Hindalong, Daugherty	4:14
Total length:			20:14

== Personnel ==
Personnel taken from Peace, Love & Light Kickstarter release update.

The Choir

- Derri Daugherty – guitars, vocals
- Steve Hindalong – drums, percussion
- Tim Chandler – bass
- Dan Michaels – sax, lyricon
- Marc Byrd – guitars

Guest performers

- Matt Slocum – Cello

Production

- Derri Daugherty – producer, recording and mixing
- Steve Hindalong – producer
