= Diamonds and Rain =

Studio album by The Choir
- Released: October 1986
- Recorded: 1986
- Studios: Pakaderm Studios, Los Alamitos, California
- Genres: Alternative rock; Christian alternative rock
- Length: 38:04
- Label: Myrrh_{LA}
- Producer: Charlie Peacock

The Choir chronology
Shades of Gray (1986)	Diamonds and Rain (1986)	Chase the Kangaroo (1988)

Singles from Diamonds and Rain
- 1. "Fear Only You" Released: November 24, 1986; 2. "When the Morning Comes" Released: December 22, 1986; 3. "Kingston Road" Released: April 27, 1987; 4. "Render Love" Released: April 27, 1987

Diamonds and Rain is the third studio release, and second full-length studio album, from alternative rock band the Choir, released in 1986. It is the first release under the band's new moniker after dropping "Youth" from their name.

== Background ==
After Shades of Gray was released, Shadow Records folded, so Youth Choir once again found themselves without a record label. Around this time, Myrrh Records was looking to expand their roster of artists specifically in the rock genre, so record executive Tom Willett moved from Nashville to Los Angeles to establish Myrrh_{LA}. With little success finding new artists during the first six months of the new imprint's existence, Willett was dragged by a local promoter to see a Youth Choir concert, and he found them to be "creatively inventive and musically prophetic." The band was signed to the new label in June 1986, just after Youth Choir's third appearance at Cornerstone, and would be the first alternative rock act signed by Myrrh. However, Willett was concerned about the band's name, so he encouraged them to drop the "Youth" moniker to reflect the band's musical maturity, as well as the practical matter of the band's placement in record sales racks; lead singer and guitarist Derri Daugherty and drummer and lyricist Steve Hindalong agreed, as they had already been considering such a name change, so the band would record as "The Choir" from this point forward.

== Recording and production ==
Even though Daugherty and Hindalong self-produced Shades of Gray with the assistance of Bill Batstone, they wanted to bring in an independent producer for this higher-profile release. Based upon his production of the 77's All Fall Down, as well as his work with Vector and his own solo work, Charlie Peacock was hired as producer. After the Choir returned to Packaderm Studios with Peacock in July and August 1986 to begin recording, the band landed a spot at that summer's Greenbelt Festival, where they were joined on stage by Peacock to debut some of their new material, which would become "notable in the Christian market at that time for its use of subtlety and for its canvas of a broad range of issues."

According to Chris Willman, writing for CCM Magazine, the lyrics of Diamonds and Rain explore "a wider variety of shades as it deals with the fear of God and the unhealthy fear of things that God has created." Hindalong explained this further, using the song "I Painted Mercy" as an example: "The winter sky can be a scary thing. God gives us mortality and we see the scariness of it. God gave us these things to draw us to Him. The element of fear draws us to God. But if we fear death, or if we go and drop a bomb on our fellow man because we fear the winter sky, we're missing the point." However, Hindalong did not intend for the lyrics on this album to be ambiguous. "I want to accomplish three things in almost every song we do: I want anybody to know what the essence of a song is lyrically; I want somebody who wants to read the lyrics and think about the song to find a lot more in it; and then there's a third level where you'd just have to ask me, because you wouldn't know because you weren't there. I think that provides intrigue, and all of those levels are important, and give something depth."

"It was intimidating at first. A lot of times, we would go in, rehearse the songs, and think that we had the arrangement down, and Charlie would walk in and say, 'You can do better than that'—and then just leave for a couple of hours. He kept driving us to force the best out of us."

— Derri Daugherty, on working with Charlie Peacock as producer

Although Hindalong credited Daugherty with being "the sound of the band" and "the musical matrix," almost half the music on the record was written or co-written by Peacock. Additionally, the album was mixed at Surrey Sound Studios, where Peacock's self-titled release was also recently mixed, so Peacock's musical imprint on Diamonds and Rain was noticeable. Peacock himself would later say, "Diamonds and Rain is much more a collaboration between two gifted artists and a producer. I grew through the process as well, primarily learning that I did not like being such a discernable contributor." Even so, highlights of the Choir's work with Peacock would be "Render Love" and "Black Cloud," songs that "combined a bruised idealism with a sense of musical drama." The Choir would ultimately re-record both songs: an acoustic version of "Black Cloud" on the band's 2010 release de-plumed and "Render Love" for the soundtrack of the 2020 film Electric Jesus.

== Artwork and packaging ==
Although bass guitarist Tim Chandler and saxophone and Lyricon player Dan Michaels were official members of the Choir, only Daugherty and Hindalong were featured in the album artwork and promotional materials for Diamonds and Rain. According to Hindalong, the band was "increasingly ashamed" of the photo on the front cover—which featured photo-retouched yellow and red spiky hair—and they would deliberately place the albums upside down on their merchandise table when on tour. Daugherty and Hindalong both rejoiced when the album went out of print.

== Release ==
The original album title under consideration was Love and Fear, but according to Hindalong, Willett was not in favor, and "suggested we look through the lyrics to find two symbols representative of these themes—hence, the more poetic Diamonds and Rain."

Myrrh_{LA} would market the newly-titled album and the band's name change with the tagline, "Youth Choir Has Come of Age." With a larger label behind them, the Choir benefited from heavy promotion, as three singles from Diamonds and Rain were initially pushed to Christian radio. The leadoff track, "Fear Only You," was the most successful, as it hit #1 on the Christian Rock charts on February 2, 1987, and held the position for the entire month. "When the Morning Comes" reached #7 on the Christian CHR charts, while "Kingston Road" climbed to #11 on the Christian Adult Contemporary charts. The Choir toured in support of this album throughout 1986 and 1987, opening for Daniel Amos on their Fearful Symmetry tour, and later opening for Randy Stonehill on his tour for The Wild Frontier; Tim Chandler did double duty as bassist for both Daniel Amos and the Choir during this period. While on tour, the Choir released "Render Love" as a follow-up single, and it reached #6 on the Christian Rock charts the week of June 8, 1987.

== Critical reception ==
Professional ratings
Review scores
Source	Rating
Billboard	Recommended
CCM Magazine	Favorable
AllMusic	2/5 stars

Reaction to Diamonds and Rain at the time of its release was positive. The album was highlighted in Billboard as a "Recommended" release in the Gospel section for the week of December 20, 1986, and the review praised it for its "pleasing pop, filled with energy and memorable melodies." CCM Magazine also praised the album, with reviewer Brian Quincy Newcomb calling Diamonds and Rain "enjoyable, thoughtful and accessible," and "a first-rate, serious effort, serious both in content and intent." Newcomb acknowledged the musical imprint of Peacock on the album, conceding that "guitars and instrumentals come across slightly subdued." However, he praised Hindalong's "impressive drum sound and intelligent, poetic lyrics," and added that Daugherty's "vocals ring out with greater confidence and melodic sense than previous efforts."

Retrospectively, John Joseph Thompson in his book Raised by Wolves: The Story of Christian Rock & Roll called Diamonds and Rain simply, "a beautiful album," while Barry Alfonso wrote in The Billboard Guide to Contemporary Christian Music that, "lyricist Hindalong's expressions of angst and yearning blended well with Daugherty's distorted, effects-laden guitar lines." Mark Allan Powell in the Encyclopedia of Contemporary Christian Music specifically called the song "Render Love" the "standout track [...] an anthem to universal reconciliation that would have fit easily into U2's late '80s repertoire." Darryl Cater at AllMusic was less enthusiastic, calling the album an "odd amalgam of their previous teenybopper pop sound and the mature progressive guitar-rock sound they would later develop; [...] the mixture of the mainstream with the alternative is not surprising, considering the producer is Charlie Peacock."

== Track listing ==
All lyrics by Steve Hindalong and all music by Derri Daugherty, unless otherwise noted.

Side one
No.	Title	Lyrics	Music	Length
1.	"Fear Only You"		Derri Daugherty, Tim Chandler	3:53
2.	"Render Love"		Charlie Peacock	4:46
3.	"All That Is You"		Daugherty, Chandler	3:27
4.	"Black Cloud"		Hindalong, Peacock	3:41
5.	"I Painted Mercy"		Daugherty, Peacock	4:16

Side two
No.	Title	Lyrics	Music	Length
1.	"Kingston Road"	Peacock	Peacock	3:40
2.	"Listen To Her Eyes"			3:22
3.	"(You Do That) Triangle"			3:18
4.	"Love Falls Down"			3:14
5.	"When The Morning Comes"			4:27
Total length:				38:04

== Personnel ==
Personnel taken from Diamonds and Rain liner notes.

The Choir

- Derri Daugherty - lead vocals, guitars
- Steve Hindalong - drums, percussion
- Tim Chandler - bass guitar
- Dan Michaels - woodwinds

Additional musicians

- Charlie Peacock - keyboards, background vocals
- Bill Batstone - acoustic guitars, background vocals
- Jerry Chamberlain - background vocals

Production

- Charlie Peacock - producer
- Mike Mierau - engineer
- Paul Abajian - assistant engineer
- Martin Heyes - mixer (Surrey Sound, Leatherhead, England)
- Bernie Grundman - mastering
- Roland Young - art direction
- Nancy French - photography
- Brian Martin - management
