= Shades of Gray (The Choir album) =

EP by Youth Choir
- Released: April 1986
- Recorded: 1986
- Studios: Pakaderm Studios, Los Alamitos, California
- Genres: Alternative rock; Christian alternative rock
- Length: 18:42
- Label: Shadow
- Producers: Derri Daugherty; Steve Hindalong

Youth Choir chronology
Voices in Shadows (1985)	Shades of Gray (1986)	Diamonds and Rain (1986)

Singles from Shades of Gray
- 1. "15 Doors" Released: September 2, 1986

Shades of Gray is the second studio release, and first EP, by alternative rock band the Choir (known as "Youth Choir" at this point), released in 1986. All five songs were later included as bonus tracks on the CD release for Chase the Kangaroo.

== Background ==
Youth Choir was dissatisfied with the results of Voices in Shadows, and during the mixing phase, the band felt that their sound needed something more. Lead singer and guitarist Derri Daugherty was a fan of Romeo Void, which featured a saxophone player who used all sorts of musical effects, and as timing would have it, one of the band's roadies spotted a flyer on Calvary Chapel's bulletin board where a sax player was looking to join a band. That turned out to be Dan Michaels, who joined Youth Choir shortly after auditioning. In addition to the saxophone, Michaels also played the Lyricon, a mouth-controlled electronic wind instrument that provided a moody, ethereal element that would soon be a key component of the Choir's sound. After Voices in Shadows was released in 1985, Youth Choir toured extensively outside of Southern California and even overseas, as the band felt they did not fit the mold of other Calvary Chapel bands that "played gigs in high school cafeterias as a witnessing tool," according to Daugherty.

"Everything in Southern California is so trendy, that a lot of times, the people are more into the fashion than they are the band. And when the fashion dies, the band pretty much goes with it. We don't want to get locked into any fashion or trend or anything; we just want to do what we're doing, and if it works, it works and if it doesn't, it doesn't."

— Derri Daugherty in 1985, on the band's approach to survival

A number of changes took place during this period: Broken Records folded in late 1985; in 1986, local promoter and friend Brian Martin became the band's manager after seeing Youth Choir open for Daniel Amos, and Tim Chandler rejoined the band as bass guitarist. On the strength of the re-recorded "A Million Years," Youth Choir signed with Shadow Records, an imprint of Refuge Records, and Martin was able to secure Youth Choir the slot as the primary opening band for Steve Taylor on his tour for On the Fritz.

== Recording history ==
Because the high-profile tour with Steve Taylor was coming up fast, Youth Choir rushed into the studio to record new material. The idea was to produce an EP in time for the tour, then follow up with a full-length album afterwards—unfortunately, delays on the part of Shadow Records kept the EP from being released until after the tour was over. Shades of Gray was recorded at Pakaderm Studios, run by John and Dino Elefante, who by this time were producing Petra's Back to the Street with new lead singer John Schlitt at the same facility. Shades of Gray would be the first release that the band produced themselves, and with this EP, drummer Steve Hindalong took over lyrical responsibilities to become the poetic voice of the Choir moving forward. In addition, Hindalong's work was finally heard on an official studio release for the first time with "15 Doors." Two members of Daniel Amos, Jerry Chamberlain and Rob Watson, contributed vocals and synths, respectively, and Bill Batstone, who co-produced the EP, would continue to work with the band on their next two albums. With Tim Chandler's bass guitar and Dan Michaels' saxophone and Lyricon, the band finally got on tape the musical voice that they had envisioned.

== Release ==
Shades of Gray was released in April 1986 on the two primary audio formats at that time, vinyl and cassette. The EP was later re-released on CD in 1988 as bonus tracks on the Chase the Kangaroo CD, then again in 2000 together with Voices in Shadows. "15 Doors" was released as the sole single from the EP, and became Youth Choir's second top ten hit on the CCM Rock charts, peaking at #5.

== Critical reception ==
Professional ratings
Review scores
Source	Rating
Contemporary Christian Magazine	Favorable
AllMusic	4/5 stars
Jesus Freak Hideout	3.5/5 stars
The Phantom Tollbooth	Favorable
CrossRhythms	8/10 stars

Unlike its dismissive response to Youth Choir’s debut release, CCM Magazine (during its brief run as the retitled Contemporary Christian Magazine) gave high praise to Shades of Gray, calling the EP "musically sustaining and thoughtful." Reviewer Brian Quincy Newcomb wrote that Daugherty's "heartfelt vocals and uniquely arresting guitar sound are driven to new heights of expression" by Hindalong's "propulsive drum attack." Newcomb singled out "15 Doors" as the highlight of the EP, saying that the Good Samaritan message was "driven home with punchy acumen in the memorable refrain."

Retrospective critical reaction also has been highly positive. Mark Allender from AllMusic called Shades of Gray "brooding, melancholy, exciting—this wonderful sound transcends the time of its release." He added that there was "no filler here; all the songs are winners." In a review of the 2000 CD reissue of Voices in Shadows and Shades of Gray, Michial Farmer at The Phantom Tollbooth said that "Fade Into You" [is an] excellent early worship [song], and "All Night Long" may well be the band’s first 'twisted love song.'" In a track-by-track breakdown of the EP, Wayne Myatt from Jesus Freak Hideout also praised these opening and closing songs, calling "Fade Into You" "distinguished" and added that "All Night Long" "has a very catchy rhythm that will recall the listener of Glass Tiger or Yes." Writing for CrossRhythms, Mike Rimmer added that "15 Doors" sounds like October-period U2 whilst "More Than Words" is slower and brooding with a hard-hitting message to narrow the reality gap between words and actions." Mark Allan Powell in the Encyclopedia of Contemporary Christian Music called Shades of Gray "a marked improvement beyond the earlier full length. All five songs are compelling (and distinctive)."

== Track listing ==
All songs written by Derri Daugherty and Steve Hindalong.

Side one
No.	Title	Length
1.	"Fade Into You"	3:58
2.	"15 Doors"	3:05
3.	"More Than Words"	2:36

Side two
No.	Title	Length
1.	"Tears Don't Fall"	4:02
2.	"All Night Long"	5:01
Total length:		18:42

== Personnel ==
Personnel taken from Shades of Gray liner notes.

Youth Choir

- Derri Daugherty – lead vocals, guitars, acoustic piano
- Steve Hindalong – drums, percussion
- Tim Chandler – bass guitar
- Dan Michaels – saxophone, Lyricon

Guest performers

- Bill Batstone - vocal arrangements, keyboards, background vocals
- Rob Watson - synthesizer (Emulator)
- Jerry Chamberlain - additional vocals

Production

- Derri Daugherty - producer
- Steve Hindalong - producer
- Bill Batstone - co-producer
- Mike Mearue - recording, mixing
- Tim Alderson - art direction, layout
- Nancy French - photography
