= Wide-Eyed Wonder =

Studio album by The Choir
- Released: March 24, 1989
- Recorded: 1988
- Studios: Neverland Studios, Los Alamitos, California
- Genres: Alternative rock; Christian alternative rock
- Length: 41:04
- Labels: Myrrh/A&M (1989); Galaxy21 (2017)
- Producers: Derri Daugherty; Steve Hindalong; Mark Heard

The Choir chronology
Chase the Kangaroo (1988)	Wide-Eyed Wonder (1989)	Circle Slide (1990)

Alternative cover
- The 2017 remastered release.

Singles from Wide-Eyed Wonder
- 1. "Someone to Hold on To" Released: April 24, 1989; 2. "Wide-Eyed Wonder" Released: July 31, 1989; 3. "To Cover You" Released: August 14, 1989; 4. "Spin You Around" Released: February 26, 1990

Wide-Eyed Wonder is the fifth studio release, and fourth full-length studio album, from alternative rock band the Choir, released in 1989. This would be the first studio album with new bass guitarist Robin Spurs, and would mark the band's first attempt to target the mainstream market.

== Background ==
After Spurs officially joined the Choir the night that Chase the Kangaroo was released, the band's new lineup spent the majority of 1988 on the road, including appearances at the Cornerstone Festival in Chicago, the Greenbelt Festival in England, and the Flevo Festival in the Netherlands. In September of that year, drummer and lyricist Steve Hindalong's first daughter, Emily, was born, and this event would have a measurable impact on the lyrical content of the Choir's follow-up album, which began production only two months later.

== Recording and production ==
With the release of Chase the Kangaroo, the Choir felt their first completely self-produced effort finally yielded an album that reflected their musical identity. As a result, Hindalong and lead singer and guitarist Derri Daugherty returned to Neverland to once again produce the band's next release. While the Choir's Chase the Kangaroo was primarily borne out of experimentation and group jam sessions over an extended period of time, Wide-Eyed Wonder was created initially between Hindalong and Daugherty sitting down together with an acoustic guitar and the lyrics, and the album only took a little more than two months to complete. The balance of the tracks came together in different ways: "Car, Etc." was built upon Daugherty's original guitar experimentation, "Robin Had a Dream" was an original musical contribution from Spurs, and "Behind That Locked Door" was a George Harrison cover recommended by Mark Heard, who produced and played autoharp on that track. The Choir also had a writing session with former bass guitarist Tim Chandler, which birthed the songs "Spin You Round" and the album's lead single "Someone to Hold on To."

== Composition ==
=== Music ===
Wide-Eyed Wonder has been called the Choir's "happy record," with the band performing the songs with an "almost commercial pop accessibility." However, Daugherty explained that the musical approach was appropriate: "We were concerned about doing justice to the lyrics. We felt like doing a more upbeat, uptempo, major-key thing because Steve had a baby and that's a major thing in his life. To come out with this real negative music at this point would be pretty dishonest."

To that end, Hindalong's folk influences from Neil Young, Crosby, Stills & Nash and the Byrds came through strongly on this album, and he said the music, which featured a heavier use of acoustic guitars, was more "American-sounding and jangly, which suited the lyrics more." However, the "two-chord drone thing" that the band explored heavily on their prior record was still present: "Car, Etc." and "Spin You Round" were two prominent examples. Dan Michaels' saxophone contributions, which Hindalong described as "fits of emotion," were more prominent on this album than any Choir release up to that point, with Michaels saying he was like a "kid in a candy store" because he played on it so much.

After the better part of a year touring with the band in support of Chase the Kangaroo, this was the first album to feature Spurs' input as bass guitarist and vocalist. Originally drawn to the Choir by the opportunity to play "gutsy, male, rock bass lines," her most prominent contribution was "Robin Had a Dream." "Robin was a great bass player; she had this real authority," Hindalong said. "She played what I called 'articulation'; she was very precise." However, the unusual chord structure of this song initially was a challenge: "Derri didn’t know what the heck to do with the guitar," Hindalong said. "It took him a while."

Several other musical influences played a role in the development of Wide-Eyed Wonder. Daugherty was listening heavily to the Smithereens at the time, and their style of chord progressions was echoed in "To Cover You." Hindalong heard Fleetwood Mac's "Hypnotized" on the radio while driving to the studio, so "Spin You Round" was built upon a similar drum pattern. Greg Lawless from Adam Again was then brought in to record the lead guitar part on that track, with Gene Eugene and Riki Michele adding backup vocals. "Car, Etc." includes a sonic "easter egg" from Public Image, Ltd. in one of Michaels' sax melodies, and the vocal phrasing that Hindalong originally had in mind for that song was inspired by James Taylor’s "Traffic Jam." While the bass line ultimately took the song in a completely different direction, that vocal phrasing can be heard in "Car, Cont.," which closes the album. Finally, at the urging of Heard, the Choir recorded their first cover song: Harrison's "Behind That Locked Door," which also featured the first use of harmonica on a Choir record.

=== Lyrics ===
Many of the songs on Wide-Eyed Wonder addressed Hindalong's joy over new fatherhood ("To Cover You," "When She Sees Me" and the title track) or the importance of family relationships ("Happy Fool," "To Bid Farewell"). Like Chase the Kangaroo, the songs referenced specific personal details from Hindalong's lived experience, particularly his daily interactions with his baby daughter. "The album was so sentimental; I was embarrassed about it a few years after," Hindalong said. "But […] I realized what it means to other people [and] that's what makes that album unique." "When She Sees Me" recounted Hindalong timing his baby daughter's heartbeat whenever he appeared to her, and this was in line with his fascination with mathematics. "Look up high / dancing bear" from the title track referenced his daughter's "wide-eyed wonder" over everything new: "Emily had this little mobile that hung in the crib," Hindalong said. "[It] was all these little bears, and it went round and round and made this gentle sound; she would stare up and [she] really loved that thing." "To Cover You" spoke frankly about Hindalong's fatherly protective instincts; originally the lyric was "to shelter you," but Hindalong changed it to sound more paternal, "because you think of a child that you're covering with a blanket."

"[A] lot of men are surprised by what awakens. You find a place in your heart that you didn't know existed when you have that first child. I didn't grow up playing with dolls. I didn't have any maternal instinct. Somebody handed me a baby, I was like, 'Ugh, give that to somebody else.' So, just the awakening of that emotion is life-changing."

— Steve Hindalong, on how new fatherhood impacted Wide-Eyed Wonder

Even the album's leadoff single, the driving rock track "Someone to Hold on To," revealed more personal details, as the phrase "spider shed" was informed by Hindalong's arachnophobia. "I remember jumping out of bed when we lived in [our] little mobile home and getting rug burns on two elbows and two knees, running straight out into the parking lot, because I thought a spider crawled across my face." This fear of spiders would continue to manifest itself when the band was on tour during this period. "Robin Had a Dream" was written in response to an actual dream that Spurs had about Hindalong. "Robin was very Charismatic, a very spiritual person," Hindalong said. "She had this dream and the interpretation of it; I basically just took that dream and made it rhyme." The song's instrumental break would later play over audio of Spurs providing her explanation. Wide-Eyed Wonder's closing song, "To Bid Farewell," remains one of the band's favorite tracks, and it was intended as a thank-you to listeners; because the Choir was never commercially successful, the band thought that this album could be their final recording.

== Artwork and packaging ==
The original front cover artwork for Wide-Eyed Wonder featured the entire band, along with a light trail superimposed over each member except for Hindalong, who was also featured solo on the rear cover. When the remastered album was released in 2017, it had entirely new cover artwork, featuring the Big Dipper set against a night sky. The rear of the remastered album showcased the photo of the band originally used on the front cover of the May 1989 issue of CCM Magazine.

== Release and promotion ==
Because of the album's upbeat subject matter, Wide-Eyed Wonder was called the Choir's "most marketable album," and Michaels agreed, saying that Myrrh Records had "a lot of energy over the record," which included hiring a management company and support staff. Daugherty concurred, adding, "that particular album was one of our busiest times. The record company was putting a lot of work into it and we were gone all the time—I mean, we were on the road a lot. To their credit […] Myrrh Records really worked hard for us. They tried everything [they] could possibly do." Wide-Eyed Wonder was heavily promoted in Christian media, and landed the band on the cover of CCM Magazine in May 1989, with the feature article written by Chris Willman, who originally introduced Spurs to the Choir.

=== Audio ===
Wide-Eyed Wonder was released in late March 1989 on CD and cassette in North America, and additionally on vinyl in the UK only. Myrrh released "Someone to Hold on To" as the first single to Christian rock radio; however, the challenge was, "there weren’t the outlets that there are now," according to Daugherty. "[Christian] rock radio was pretty much 25 stations around the country that on Friday nights from midnight to 4:00am, played [Christian rock]." However, because Myrrh had a mainstream distribution deal with A&M Records, they agreed to work the album and target the Choir to a broader market. In June 1989, A&M sent out a four-track EP that included "Someone to Hold on To," "To Cover You," "Robin Had a Dream" and an exclusive dub remix of "Car, Etc." to college rock stations, where the Choir enjoyed some moderate success.

Despite the limited hours in which the Choir's music was heard on Christian radio, the four singles released from Wide-Eyed Wonder performed well. "Someone to Hold on To" became the band's third single to reach #1 on the CCM Rock chart, with "To Cover You" later reaching #5, and "Spin You Around" peaking at #12 the following year. Both "Wide-Eyed Wonder" and "Someone to Hold on To" made brief appearances on the CCM CHR chart, reaching #10 and #12, respectively.

==== Remastered version (2017) ====
In April 2017, the Choir re-released a fully remastered version of Wide-Eyed Wonder on streaming services, CD and vinyl. The CD re-release was a two-CD set with a second CD featuring audio commentary on each track from Hindalong and Michaels.

=== Video ===
To assist A&M with their crossover promotion, Myrrh financed a video album entitled Wide-Eyed Wonder Videos to introduce the Choir to new listeners, which included two music videos and a band documentary. The first video, "Someone to Hold On To," was a mix of black-and-white and color footage, directed by photographer Linda Myers-Krikorian, the then-wife of eccentric singer/songwriter Tonio K.; this was filmed at various locations in Los Angeles, including on the rooftop of a building at sunset. The second video, "Robin Had a Dream," was directed by Mark Heard and shot entirely on Super 8 film in Heard's first attempt at working in that medium. Myers-Krikorian also directed a 32-minute black and white documentary—both straightforward and humorous—on the lives of all four band members and their families. Wide-Eyed Wonder Videos was later nominated for Best Long Form Video at the 21st GMA Dove Awards, losing to Petra's On Fire.

== Tours ==
=== The Way Home tour ===
Although the Choir had been headlining their own shows since Chase the Kangaroo, the band was given its most significant opportunity to reach a wider Christian audience as the opening act for Russ Taff on his 54-date tour for The Way Home. At that time, Taff was one of the most popular male solo artists in contemporary Christian music, and he consistently played much larger audiences than the Choir ever could reach. Myrrh believed that, even though the Choir was alternative rock, the uptempo nature of the band's new music would connect with an audience coming out to hear Taff's gospel-tinged rock. While the Choir did reach new listeners, the tour didn't expand their audience as much as the label was expecting. In fact, some attendees were highly critical of the band. "The audience overwhelmingly hated us," Hindalong claimed. "You could feel the disdain." Daugherty agreed, and added that, "people would come out and lecture us at our merchandise booth: 'We didn’t preach enough.' There would be a couple of nights where people would get up and literally take their youth group out."

This tension between the band's creative artistry and the expectations of the contemporary Christian music audience soon became a story of its own. Thanks to an aggressive publicist, Hindalong did over 50 interviews with mainstream press during this tour, which generated more feature stories than headliner Taff himself. Much of the attention was focused on the Choir's unease with being tagged with the "Christian rock band" label. However, Hindalong himself was uncomfortable with the lack of nuance to this news coverage: "I would talk for half an hour about our music and what it is about," he recounted. "They would get me to say something about Christian radio or our frustration about being marketed, and that would be the story. I didn't see any press until the end of the tour, and then there's this huge stack and it's all so negative. And I tried so hard to be positive."

This dichotomy was seen even in the vehicles the two artists employed. Taff had a large, silver tour bus typical of a successful recording artist, while the Choir only had a small van. Just prior to the start of the tour, Michaels was driving the van and accidentally ran into a cow on the freeway late at night, which caused considerable damage to the front end. The Choir would deliberately park their busted-up van right next to Taff's tour bus just for the irony.

At the end of the tour, the Choir announced that this would be their last time opening for a mainstream contemporary Christian artist.

=== 2017 Anniversary tour ===
In October 2016, the Choir announced that the original Wide-Eyed Wonder-era line-up with Spurs would reunite and tour in the spring of 2017, performing the album in its entirety, along with selected tracks from the Choir's most recent albums.

== Critical reception ==
Professional ratings
Review scores
Source	Rating
CCM Magazine	Favorable
The Oklahoman	Favorable
AllMusic	4/5 stars

Wide-Eyed Wonder was positively received by critics at the time, with the band receiving a number of end-of-year accolades from a variety of Christian publications, most notably, CCM Magazine. Wide-Eyed Wonder was the lead review in the April 1989 issue, as writer Chris Willman called the Choir "the best rock band in Christian music," adding that the album was "more cohesive than its predecessor." He highlighted the more commercial sound of Wide-Eyed Wonder, saying that "virtually everything on Side One is instantly radio-ready pop-rock; all that 'accessibility' gently leads you by the hand to Side Two, which gets a bit softer and weirder around the edges." He concluded that Christian “radio and retail would be well-advised to catch onto the group now, while it's in such a contagiously life-affirming mood." Chuck Davis, writing for The Oklahoman, agreed, saying "the quartet lifts one's spirits as high as any of the so-called Christian rock groups do." He called the album "a breath of fresh air," and praised it for "intelligent, thought-provoking lyrics. A good sound. Something you can sink your teeth into."

Retrospectively, Wide-Eyed Wonder has also received praise. John Joseph Thompson in Raised by Wolves: The Story of Christian Rock & Roll credited this album for bringing "increased romance and vulnerability to the band’s style." Mark Allender at AllMusic wrote that the Choir "began to receive some of the attention they deserved" with this album, which he described as "more dense than the previous year's Chase the Kangaroo, and in many ways more accessible." However, he criticized the inclusion of the Harrison cover as "surprising – and a little off-putting." Other critics opted to highlight individual songs on the album. Barry Alfonso, writing in The Billboard Guide to Contemporary Christian Music, said that "the rapturous title track and the confessional 'Someone to Hold on To' were among Wide-Eyed Wonder's standout tracks." Mark Allan Powell in the Encyclopedia of Contemporary Christian Music agreed, writing that "the album bursts into full bloom with 'Someone to Hold On To,'" and that the "atypical novelty tune 'Car, Etc.'" sounds like "something the Beach Boys would have done."

=== Accolades ===
- CCM Magazine
  - Best Alternative Album
  - Best Alternative Rock Band
  - Best Long Form Video
  - No. 5 Favorite Song ("Someone to Hold On To")
- Campus Life
  - Editor's Choice of Excellence
- Harvest Rock Syndicate
  - Artist of the Year
  - Group of the Year
  - Best Alternative Album
  - Drummer of the Year (Steve Hindalong)
- Group
  - Top Seven Albums of 1989

=== Awards and nominations ===
- 21st Annual Dove Awards (1990) – Best Long Form Video (nomination)

== Track listing ==
All songs written by Steve Hindalong and Derri Daugherty except where noted.

Side one
No.	Title	Writer(s)	Length
1.	"Someone to Hold On To"	Steve Hindalong, Derri Daugherty, Tim Chandler	3:50
2.	"To Cover You"		2:31
3.	"Robin Had a Dream"	Hindalong, Robin Spurs	4:17
4.	"Spin You Around"	Hindalong, Daugherty, Chandler	4:11
5.	"When She Sees Me"		4:11
6.	"Wide-Eyed Wonder"		3:35

Side two
No.	Title	Writer(s)	Length
1.	"Happy Fool"		3:29
2.	"Car, Etc."	Hindalong, Daugherty, Chandler	6:17
3.	"Behind That Locked Door"	George Harrison	3:02
4.	"To Bid Farewell"		4:38
5.	"Car, Cont."		1:03
Total length:			41:04

2017 remastered edition — Vinyl (Side one)
No.	Title	Writer(s)	Length
1.	"Someone to Hold On To"	Hindalong, Daugherty, Chandler	3:51
2.	"To Cover You"		2:32
3.	"Robin Had a Dream"	Hindalong, Spurs	4:18
4.	"Spin You Around"	Hindalong, Daugherty, Chandler	4:12
5.	"When She Sees Me"		4:12

2017 remastered edition — Vinyl (Side two)
No.	Title	Writer(s)	Length
1.	"Wide-Eyed Wonder"		3:35
2.	"Happy Fool"		3:30
3.	"Car, Etc."	Hindalong, Daugherty, Chandler	6:17
4.	"Behind That Locked Door"	Harrison	3:03
5.	"To Bid Farewell"		4:40
6.	"Car, Cont."		1:04
Total length:			41:14

2017 remastered edition — Band Commentary (CD disc 2)
No.	Title	Length
1.	"Someone to Hold On To [Band Commentary]"	4:07
2.	"To Cover You [Band Commentary]"	2:35
3.	"Robin Had a Dream [Band Commentary]"	4:34
4.	"Spin You Around [Band Commentary]"	4:15
5.	"When She Sees Me [Band Commentary]"	4:21
6.	"Wide-Eyed Wonder [Band Commentary]"	3:38
7.	"Happy Fool [Band Commentary]"	3:43
8.	"Car, Etc. [Band Commentary]"	6:22
9.	"Behind That Locked Door [Band Commentary]"	3:41
10.	"To Bid Farewell [Band Commentary]"	4:44
11.	"Car, Cont. [Band Commentary]"	1:16
Total length:		43:16

== Personnel ==
Personnel taken from Wide-Eyed Wonder liner notes.

The Choir

- Derri Daugherty – lead vocals, guitars
- Steve Hindalong – drums, percussion
- Robin Spurs – bass guitar, vocals
- Dan Michaels – saxophone, Lyricon

Additional musicians

- Greg Lawless – guitar solo ("Spin You Around")
- Mark Heard – bass guitar and autoharp ("Behind That Locked Door"), background vocals ("Someone to Hold on To", "When She Sees Me", "Behind That Locked Door")
- Gene Eugene – background vocals ("Spin You Around")
- Riki Michele – background vocals ("Spin You Around")
- Marc Sercomb – background vocals ("Car, Etc.," "Car, Cont.")
- Nancy Hindalong – background vocals ("Car, Etc.")
- Emily Hindalong – background vocals ("Car, Etc.")
- "Squeaky Bear" – background vocals ("Car, Etc.")
- Dave Hackbarth – background vocals ("Car, Etc.")
- Orlando Conchola – background vocals ("Car, Etc.")

Production

- Tom Willett – executive producer
- Todd Goodman – executive producer [2017 remaster]
- Steve Hindalong – producer
- Derri Daugherty – producer
- Mark Heard – producer ("Wide-Eyed Wonder" and "Behind That Locked Door"), additional production, mixing at Neverland Studios, Los Alamitos, California
- Dave Hackbarth – additional production, recording
- Steve Hall – mastering (Future Disc)
- John Flynn – design (F2 Design)
- Linda Myers-Krikorian – photography
- Paul Emery — manager
- Nigel Palmer – remastering (Lowland Masters) [2017 remaster]
- Steve Broderson – design (Cruxial Creative) [2017 remaster]
