= Chase the Kangaroo =

Studio album by The Choir
- Released: March 24, 1988
- Recorded: 1987
- Studios: Neverland Studios, Los Alamitos, California
- Genres: Alternative rock; Christian alternative rock
- Length: 46:49
- Labels: Myrrh (1988); Word (2012); Curb/Word (2024)
- Producers: Derri Daugherty; Steve Hindalong

The Choir chronology
Diamonds and Rain (1986)	Chase the Kangaroo (1988)	Wide-Eyed Wonder (1989)

Alternative cover
- The cassette version.

Alternative cover
- The CD version.

Singles from Chase the Kangaroo
- 1. "Clouds" Released: May 9, 1988; 2. "Consider" Released: May 23, 1988; 3. "Chase the Kangaroo" Released: October 10, 1988

Chase the Kangaroo is the fourth studio release, and third full-length studio album, from alternative rock band the Choir, released in 1988. Considered by critics to be one of their finest albums, Chase the Kangaroo is listed at No. 50 in the book CCM Presents: The 100 Greatest Albums in Christian Music, published in 2002, and No. 4 on the list of the "Top 100 Christian Rock Albums of All Time" by HM in 2010.

== Background ==
In the midst of supporting Daniel Amos on their Fearful Symmetry tour in late 1986, the Choir received some devastating news—drummer and lyricist Steve Hindalong's wife Nancy had suffered her second miscarriage. This experience drove Hindalong to write a poem for his wife entitled "A Sad Face," which was inspired by the Bible verse in Ecclesiastes 7:3 which said, "Sorrow is better than laughter, because a sad face is good for the heart." This verse would ultimately become the theme of the Choir's next album, and the poem's lyrics would be revised and adapted for the song, "Sad Face." Even though the Choir had achieved a heightened national profile during this time due to touring across the US with both Daniel Amos and Randy Stonehill, Hindalong was forced to make ends meet by working in construction, which included digging ditches. However, lead singer and guitarist Derri Daugherty was able to put aside enough money to create his own recording studio, dubbed "Neverland" as an homage to Peter Pan, located right next door to Pakaderm Studios in Los Alamitos, CA, where the band recorded their prior two studio releases.

== Recording and production ==
"Our record company thought [Chase the Kangaroo] was demos. They were under the impression that we would take all this time and record all these songs, and then they were going to bring in a producer to save the day. And we, all the time, were thinking, 'This is the record we’re making. We don’t want another producer; we’re going to do it ourselves.'"

— Derri Daugherty, on the album’s development

The recording process for Chase the Kangaroo was long and difficult, and Daugherty and Hindalong felt the pressure of living up to the success of Diamonds and Rain as well as proving themselves as producers. "We really struggled to make this record," Hindalong said. "It took us 20 weeks, we had pretty much recorded it twice, and we never agreed about much during the process." When the Choir wasn't using the studio, Adam Again came in at night to record their sophomore album Ten Songs by Adam Again, and it wasn't unusual for the Choir to arrive at Neverland in the morning and see Adam Again frontman Gene Eugene still working away at the controls. Eugene would end up mixing the first two songs on Chase the Kangaroo, and he and Riki Michele would also contribute background vocals. Hindalong would return the favor by co-writing the first two tracks on Ten Songs.

Chase the Kangaroo benefited from other key contributors, primarily lead singer and bass guitarist Steve Griffith from Vector. According to Hindalong, Griffith was "a great engineer, who engineered the All Fall Down record for the 77's up in Sacramento. We were such a fan of that album, for a period of a few weeks, we brought Steve down to work with us." Griffith would perform a variety of duties, including bass guitar, additional production and background vocals. Mark Heard, who had helped produce the re-recorded version of "A Million Years," also returned to assist with engineering, recording and background vocals.

One challenge during the recording process was capturing the work of saxophone and Lyricon player Dan Michaels, who—in contrast to his more animated stage presence—would tend to freeze up under studio pressure. As a result, Daugherty and Hindalong asked Michaels to "just play along with a track" as a "rehearsal," so they could secretly record his performance; most of Michaels' contributions on Chase the Kangaroo were captured this way.

== Composition ==
=== Music ===
The Choir explored far more atmospheric and ambient textures on Chase the Kangaroo with "deep rhythms, layered guitars, [and] haunting vocals." Daugherty experimented extensively with multiple guitars and effects, and Hindalong implemented drum programming along with a variety of analog drum setups, all of which were present on the album's thematic centerpiece, "Sad Face." To create that song, the band started jamming together, and then "the whole thing formed nearly in one sound check," according to bass guitarist Tim Chandler. Daugherty then used a Korg SDD 3000 Delay for its "weird, harmonic modulation feature," which Hindalong claimed was "one of my favorite guitar things Derri's ever done." Hindalong used an E-mu SP-12 for the drum programming, which included sampling his own kick and snare drum work, and it was Eugene who insisted the drum machine end the song with no musical accompaniment before transitioning into the ambient instrumental coda. Finally, Michaels used a Yamaha version of a Lyricon run through an Oberheim extension module for a more digital-sounding musical contribution.

In addition to "Sad Face," Daugherty said that "one of the [proudest] things of ours that I've ever done" is the instrumental break for "Clouds," which was created using an initial recording on magnetic tape, then flipped backwards to record additional instrumentation with the assistance of DAT technology. "[Back] then, it was not easy to do," Daugherty said. "There weren't a lot of bands doing that kind of thing." Daugherty also experimented with a wah-wah pedal, which was used on both "Look Out (For Your Own)" and "Children of Time." Michaels' saxophone solo at the end of the latter song was another example of "sabotage recording," as he put it, in which he was captured on tape doing warmups. This exact solo would be re-used again in "I'm Sorry I Laughed" on 2010's Burning Like the Midnight Sun.

Hindalong also experimented with different percussion techniques. On "Look Out (For Your Own)," he used Blasticks (plastic-tipped drumsticks) on a custom drum setup inspired by Mick Fleetwood, using a floor tom and high hat on each side of the drum kit. Hindalong also took advantage of studio technology for the recording of "Cain," as he could not play the drums fast enough. Engineer Dave Hackbarth slowed the analog tape down so Hindalong could play along, which made the final performance sound much tighter at normal speed.

=== Lyrics ===
"Sad Face," with its transparent and vulnerable lyrics, proved to be the most impactful song on the album, as the band has received more mail about this song than anything else they have ever recorded, and it has become a live set list mainstay in the years since. Many of the other songs on the album also dealt with weighty topics, like mortality ("Children of Time"), the deadly power of words ("Cain"), the importance of caring for one's eldest family members ("Look Out (For Your Own)") and disconnection from loved ones ("So Far Away").

"Clouds" was a key exception, with a strong worshipful mood. It was one of the last songs written for the album, and was inspired by a quote that Hindalong read in Oswald Chambers' devotional My Utmost for His Highest: "After the amazing delight and liberty of realizing what Jesus Christ does, comes the impenetrable darkness of realizing Who He is." Hindalong also drew upon imagery of clouds and thick darkness from Psalm 97:2. "The center of our music is the mystery of God, what we don't know, and accepting the fact that more and more will be revealed," he explained. The song then ends with a snippet of Daugherty's mother Louise singing a hymn at the church where his father served as pastor.

"The Rifleman" juxtaposed spoken verses by a number of individuals, primarily road manager Marc Sercomb, as well as background vocalist Sharon McCall, Hindalong and others, with Daugherty singing the chorus. The song then fades into a reprise of "Render Love" from Diamonds and Rain at the very end, as Hindalong wanted to explore the tension between what people say and what they do when it comes to violence. "I was really influenced by Bruce Cockburn and some of his real anti-war, pacifist type thinking," Hindalong said, "[and] we'd have these big political arguments all the time. I've always enjoyed violence and revenge as much as anybody else; growing up, The Rifleman was my favorite show. That's why at the end I put 'Render Love' just to show that irony of [...] I can argue about whatever I want to argue about, but it doesn't make me a pacifist in my heart. We're all conflicted."

"Everybody in the Band" was thrown together quickly in the studio as a way to ensure a tenth song on the album, and to add a shot of levity. This was the first time Hindalong performed lead vocals on a Choir song, and his humorous lyrics honor Sercomb with the line, "He smokes a lot of Camels"; however, this was replaced by, "In tears for man's condition," as Myrrh would not allow the mention of smoking in the lyrics. This song and its lyrics would be reinterpreted by the band countless times in concert, particularly on the Choir's acoustic tour for de-plumed in 2010.

The title track "Chase the Kangaroo" was inspired by a Bugs Bunny cartoon that Hindalong watched during the time he was working construction, "mostly picking and shoveling, in the ditch for days." Although Bugs Bunny tunneled his way through to China, Hindalong looked at a globe and determined that if he continued digging through the earth, he'd actually end up in Australia. Hindalong later called the title of the album, "the stupidest thing ever," and a result of "thinking too hard." Nevertheless, Hindalong hoped that the song's focus on perseverance would "[inspire] others to press on. Life is really challenging, and we've had plenty of troubles. We're growing, we're still evolving, we're still learning. We still have a lot of hope."

== Artwork and packaging ==
Upon initial release, the album cover artwork for Chase the Kangaroo differed for each of the three primary audio formats at that time (vinyl, cassette and CD). In addition, the external printed song order was incorrect, with "Clouds" listed first, instead of "Consider." The liner notes were entirely hand-written by Hindalong, and included occasional song details as well as the original lyrics for "Everybody in the Band."

For the 2024 remastered release, the CD cover art was changed to match the LP design.

== Release ==
Chase the Kangaroo was released in March 1988. The Choir and friends celebrated with a big party at Neverland, and it was on that night that Robin Spurs was announced as the band's new bassist. Originally with the popular L.A. cult band the Toasters, Spurs was introduced to the Choir by her then-boyfriend, writer Chris Willman, who would later go on to be a music critic and features editor for Entertainment Weekly and Variety, respectively. Spurs immediately joined the Choir on tour as they played a mixture of L.A. clubs (the Roxy and the Troubador), opening slots for the 77's, and their own shows across the US.

The tension and urgency to this new collection of songs, along with its overall sense of foreboding, made the band wonder if Myrrh would ever let them record another album. "What are they going to do with this?" Derri asked. Ironically, it was a significantly edited version of the expansive "Clouds" that was sent out to mainstream Christian radio as the album's first single, but it garnered very little airplay. Stations had issues with the lyric, "The blood is still as rich / That poor sinners drink like wine," claiming that reference to the Christian practice of Communion was "too Catholic for Christian radio." Myrrh quickly sent out "Consider" as the follow-up single, and it hit #1 on the CCM Rock chart the week of July 4, 1988. Later that year, the title track was released as a second single to Christian rock radio, and it peaked at #7. Sales of Chase the Kangaroo eventually outpaced that of Diamonds and Rain.

The original CD release of Chase the Kangaroo included all five songs from Shades of Gray as bonus tracks.

=== 25th anniversary re-release (2012) ===
To celebrate the album's 25th anniversary, Chase the Kangaroo was reissued in 2012 as a 2-CD set, with the first CD comprising the original 10-track release, and the second CD featuring audio commentary for each song from Hindalong, Daugherty, Chandler and Michaels. The Choir followed this with a short tour, on which they played the entire album in its entirety, along with selected tracks from The Loudest Sound Ever Heard.

=== Remastered version (2024) ===
As a result of a successful 2023 Kickstarter campaign, Chase the Kangaroo was re-released for a second time in March 2024, this time fully remastered. The album was made available as a single CD or single LP, the latter format for the first time since 1988, and in a new gatefold package. Vinyl options included black, blue or orange, along with a custom-engraved wooden box to hold all three versions as well as other campaign rewards.

According to the band, because Myrrh Records (now Curb/Word) still owns the copyright to the album, both the re-released and remastered versions of Chase the Kangaroo could not be released digitally. However, the 2012 audio commentary was re-released as a digital download for Kickstarter supporters.

==== 7 + 77s = 9: Reinterpretations ====
Because the campaign exceeded a $77,000 stretch goal, the Choir released a bonus CD entitled 7 + 77s = 9: Reinterpretations, which included nine new tracks. The first seven were a mix of studio and live re-recorded versions of Choir songs: six from Chase the Kangaroo, along with a remixed version of the 2023 re-recording of "More Than Words," originally released to the Choir's Patreon supporters. The remaining two tracks were in partnership with the 77s, as each band agreed to go into the studio and record a cover tune from the other if the stretch goal was achieved. The Choir recorded "Nowhere Else" from the 77s' 1990 album Sticks and Stones, while the 77s recorded "To Cover You" from the Choir's 1989 album Wide-Eyed Wonder. These two songs were later released as a split single on colored vinyl in September 2024.

In October 2024, the Choir released an abridged EP of this album simply entitled Reinterpretations, which featured five tracks: the Choir's cover of "Nowhere Else," as well as "Consider," "The Rifleman," "Chase The Kangaroo," and "More Than Words." This EP was released for digital download on iTunes, and is now widely available on various music streaming platforms.

== Critical reception ==
Professional ratings
Review scores
Source	Rating
CCM Magazine	Favorable
Cornerstone Magazine	Favorable
AllMusic	4/5 stars

Chase the Kangaroo was well-received upon release. In CCM Magazine, writer Brian Quincy Newcomb called the record "the coming-of-age album for one of the outstanding bands to arise from the Southern California new music renaissance." He added that the band "[approximated] some of the raw thrash of its live performance and the freedom of expression afforded by its own studio," and summed up the review by stating, "the Edge-like quality on some of the guitar tracks and traceable references to bands on the English shore in no way sullies the presence of a distinct Choir sound." Cornerstone Magazine expressed similar sentiments, saying that Chase the Kangaroo was "musically stunning and lyrically brilliant." The review praised Daugherty's lead guitar work as "favorably comparing to the Edge's," declaring that the album was "biting atmospheric rock of diamond quality."

"By working with me, Steve and Derri learned that they needed a stronger vision for their own music. They learned that if they didn't show up with a strong vision and the stamina to carry it out, this work would fall to the producer. Consequently, their next album (Chase the Kangaroo) was [...] stronger artistically. They were more in command of their art."

— Charlie Peacock, on the Choir's musical growth

Retrospectively, the album continues to be highly praised. Chase the Kangaroo is listed at No. 50 in the book CCM Presents: The 100 Greatest Albums in Christian Music. In that entry, writer Newcomb stated that "it was the passion in the lyrics and Daugherty's vocal delivery—together with the overall energy of the instrumental arrangements—that lifted this album above the norm." He praised the "keen philosophical insights [...] that engaged the mind and trusted the listener to figure out what was what," and called the Choir "a Christian band that rocked with intensity," and "the real deal." In addition, Mark Allan Powell wrote in the Encyclopedia of Contemporary Christian Music that "the band achieves a more distinctive sound on Chase the Kangaroo," and regarded the "martial drumbeat" of "Clouds" as, "similar to that which undergirds Fleetwood Mac's Tusk." He also praised Hindalong's "poetic sensibilities [that] are atypical for an industry with a decided tendency toward predictable expressions and themes." HM ranked the album at No. 4 on the list of "Top 100 Christian Rock Albums of All Time," saying that "this band helped define how great 'alternative' Christian rock could be," and described the album as a "warm, yet melancholy journey." In his four-star review for all AllMusic, Mark Allender wrote that the strength of the album is in its musicianship: "Hindalong's drumming really comes to the forefront on this release – held silent for so long. And Daugherty's guitar commands the sound of the record through subtlety and restraint." He summed up Chase the Kangaroo as "a work of creativity and integrity."

== Track listing ==
All lyrics by Steve Hindalong. All music by Hindalong, Derri Daugherty and Tim Chandler, except where noted.

Side one
No.	Title	Music	Length
1.	"Consider"		4:07
2.	"Children of Time"		5:09
3.	"Clouds"	Derri Daugherty, Steve Griffith	7:00
4.	"Sad Face"		7:14

Side two
No.	Title	Music	Length
1.	"Cain"	Daugherty, Griffith	5:18
2.	"The Rifleman"		3:43
3.	"Look Out (For Your Own)"		3:28
4.	"Everybody in the Band"	Hindalong	1:35
5.	"So Far Away"	Daugherty	5:15
6.	"Chase the Kangaroo"	Daugherty	4:09
Total length:			46:49

CD: Shades of Gray bonus tracks
No.	Title	Length
11.	"Fade Into You"	3:58
12.	"15 Doors"	3:05
13.	"More Than Words"	2:36
14.	"Tears Don't Fall"	4:02
15.	"All Night Long"	5:01
Total length:		65:31

25th anniversary reissue (2012) - Band commentary (CD disc 2)
No.	Title	Length
1.	"Consider [Band Commentary]"	4:07
2.	"Children of Time [Band Commentary]"	5:09
3.	"Clouds [Band Commentary]"	7:00
4.	"Sad Face [Band Commentary]"	7:14
5.	"Cain [Band Commentary]"	5:18
6.	"The Rifleman [Band Commentary]"	3:43
7.	"Look Out (For Your Own) [Band Commentary]"	3:28
8.	"Everybody in the Band [Band Commentary]"	1:35
9.	"So Far Away [Band Commentary]"	5:15
10.	"Chase the Kangaroo [Band Commentary]"	4:09
Total length:		46:49

Crowdfunded bonus studio album (CD) (2024) - 7 + 77s = 9: Reinterpretations
No.	Title	Lyrics	Music	Length
1.	"Consider"			3:30
2.	"The Rifleman"			3:45
3.	"Chase the Kangaroo"		Daugherty	4:00
4.	"Children of Time (Live at Spooky’s Lair)"			4:45
5.	"Clouds (Live at Spooky’s Lair)"		Daugherty, Griffith	4:47
6.	"Sad Face (Live at Spooky’s Lair)"			4:24
7.	"To Cover You (The 77s cover The Choir)"		Daugherty, Hindalong	4:05
8.	"Nowhere Else (The Choir covers 77s)"	The 77s	The 77s	4:54
9.	"More Than Words"		Daugherty, Hindalong	4:43
Total length:				38:53

== Personnel ==
=== Chase the Kangaroo ===
Personnel taken from Chase the Kangaroo liner notes.

The Choir

- Derri Daugherty – lead vocals, guitars, keyboards
- Steve Hindalong – drums, percussion, vocals, lead vocals on "Everybody in the Band"
- Tim Chandler – bass guitar
- Dan Michaels – saxophone and Lyricon

Additional musicians

- Bill Batstone – keyboards ("Clouds"), background vocals ("Clouds", "Cain")
- Steve Griffith – bass guitar, background vocals ("Clouds")
- Nancy Hindalong – background vocals ("Sad Face")
- Mark Heard – background vocals (“Cain”)
- Gene Eugene – background vocals ("Look Out (For Your Own)")
- Riki Michele – background vocals ("Look Out (For Your Own)")
- Jerry Chamberlain – background vocals ("So Far Away")
- Sharon McCall – background vocals ("So Far Away")
- Marc Sercomb – spoken verses ("The Rifleman")

Production

- Tom Willett – executive producer
- Robert J. Knutson – executive producer [2024 remaster]
- Derri Daugherty – producer, engineer, recording
- Steve Hindalong - producer, engineer, recording, handwritten liner notes
- Dan Michaels – associate producer [2024 remaster]
- Lisa Michaels – associate producer [2024 remaster]
- Steve Griffith - additional production
- Gene Eugene - additional production, recording
- Dave Hackbarth – engineer, recording
- Mark Heard – engineer, recording
- Nigel Palmer at Lowland Masters – mastering [2024 remaster]
- John Joseph Flynn – concept and design, for OZ graphics
- Mark Ludena for Bassline-Shift – reissue design [2024 remaster]
- Tim Alderson – art direction and coordination
- Stewart Ivester – photography
- Phillip Foster – additional graphic assistance
- Stewart Ivester – additional graphic assistance
- Ed at Slides and Print – additional graphic assistance
- June at Slides and Print – additional graphic assistance
- Marcella at Slides and Print – additional graphic assistance
- Brian Martin - manager

=== 7 + 77s = 9: Reinterpretations ===
Personnel taken from 7 + 77s = 9: Reinterpretations liner notes.

The Choir

- Derri Daugherty – lead vocals, guitars, bass guitar, keyboards
- Steve Hindalong – drums, percussion, vocals
- Dan Michaels – saxophone, Lyricon

Additional musicians

- Michael Roe – lead vocals, guitar, bass guitar ("To Cover You")
- Bruce Spencer – drums ("To Cover You")
- Matt Slocum – cellos ("Consider")
- Steven Leiweke – acoustic and electric guitars ("Consider"), acoustic guitar ("Rifleman")
- Chris Donohue – bass guitar ("Rifleman," "Nowhere Else")
- Matt Fuqua – electric guitar, background vocals ("Nowhere Else")
- Josh Havens – background vocals ("Nowhere Else")

Production

- Robert J. Knutson – executive producer
- The Choir – producer
- The 77s – producer ("To Cover You")
- Derri Daugherty – engineer, mixer
- Steven Leiweke – engineer ("Rifleman," "Nowhere Else")
- Daniel Davis – engineer ("Nowhere Else")
- Russ Long – mixer ("Nowhere Else")
- Bruce Spencer – mixer ("To Cover You")
- The Afters – special thanks
