= Speckled Bird (album) =

Studio album by The Choir
- Released: July 1, 1994
- Recorded: 1992–1994
- Studios: Neverland Studios (West), Cerritos, California; Neverland Studios (East), Berry Hill, Tennessee; Pakaderm Studios, Los Alamitos, California
- Genre: Alternative rock
- Length: 46:48
- Label: R.E.X.
- Producers: Derri Daugherty; Steve Hindalong

The Choir chronology
Kissers and Killers (1993)	Speckled Bird (1994)	Love Songs and Prayers: A Retrospective (1995)

The Choir studio albums chronology
Kissers and Killers (1993)	Speckled Bird (1994)	Free Flying Soul (1996)

Alternative cover
- Revised with extra feathers to hide nudity.

Singles from Speckled Bird
- 1. "Spring" Released: August 15, 1994; 2. "Speckled Bird" Released: December 5, 1994

Speckled Bird is the eighth studio release, and seventh full-length studio album, from alternative rock band the Choir, released in 1994. The album is largely a remixed and reworked version of the independent Kissers and Killers project with an additional five tracks.

== Background ==
When major Christian record labels Word Records (the parent company of Myrrh) and Sparrow Records shuttered operations in Southern California in the early 1990s and consolidated their efforts in Nashville, Tennessee, that city—known primarily as the center of country music—quickly became the center of contemporary Christian music as well. Because of this, a number of musicians and production personnel who were friends of the Choir had relocated to Nashville, and now the band was faced with the same decision. With Word ending its support for the Choir's label Glasshouse, relocation presented greater financial opportunities for the band, now that lead singer and guitarist Derri Daugherty and drummer and lyricist Steve Hindalong had become seasoned producers of other artists, and saxophone and Lyricon player Dan Michaels had gained record label management experience with Glasshouse during its brief tenure. The cost of living in Nashville was also less expensive, and the city was a more central location for touring. Because of this, Daugherty, Hindalong and Michaels made a permanent move to Nashville in late 1993, arriving on Halloween.

The transition was difficult. Marital relationships were strained, as band members were completely unprepared for that winter’s ice storm. The new location of Neverland Studios was in a rough neighborhood, and the band had to deal with vandalism and stolen gear. Michaels, who was mourning the end of a relationship, was forced to live in the new studio and take showers at the local YMCA. After leaving their high-profile association with Myrrh, and failing to secure a mainstream record deal with Kissers and Killers, the band "returned a little sheepishly to the Christian fold they had all but ignored for three years," and signed a one-album deal with R.E.X. Records.

== Recording and production ==
Speckled Bird would be the first project that the members of the Choir worked on after arriving in Nashville, and they flew in bass guitarist Tim Chandler for additional writing and recording sessions. This birthed three additional songs: "Never More True," "Spring," and the title track. Hindalong would write "Like a Cloud" based on an unused guitar part from the sessions for Kissers and Killers, and "Wilderness" would be the fifth new track for the album. Because Hindalong was self-conscious about his vocal performance on "Let the Sky Fall," that song was not included on Speckled Bird.

== Artwork and packaging ==
The central image featured on the front of Speckled Bird was a female model portraying a spotted bird chained inside a wooden box. While the band "went for it at the time for its dramatic effect," it was retrospectively called "unfortunate cover art" by Mark Allan Powell in the Encyclopedia of Contemporary Christian Music. The image was soon quietly updated with additional feathers to cover the slightly revealing nude shot of the model's buttocks.

== Release ==
Speckled Bird was released on July 1, 1994 on CD and cassette. Two singles were released to Christian radio programming which focused on rock and metal: "Spring" reached #2 on the CCM Rock chart, while the title track, released later in 1994, peaked at #7.

== Critical reception ==
Professional ratings
Review scores
Source	Rating
CCM Magazine	Favorable
Cross Rhythms	9/10 stars
AllMusic	2/5 stars

Critical response at the time was positive. Writing for CCM Magazine, critic Bruce A. Brown called Speckled Bird a "great album," saying that "what makes the band's sound so intriguing is that it's built on four disparate styles of playing. Steve Hindalong switches rapidly from conventional patterns and rhythms to jazzy off-beat licks; Derri Daugherty will ease from a verse of delicate, finger-picked guitar fills to an eight-bar solo of feedback, and sax/lyricon player Dan Michaels' approach is to layer free jazz solos over the whole deal!" Brown added that bass guitarist Tim Chandler was the "melodic anchor of the group," and also praised Hindalong’s "poetic" nature-based metaphors in his lyrics. Liz Liew, writing for Cross Rhythms, also focused her review mainly on the album's musical structures. She said that "Derri's prominent tremolo fuzzy guitar effects provide the underlying thread throughout the album, which often takes precedence over his vocals." While critical of the remix of "Yellow Skies" because it replaced "the original guitar breaks with vocal interludes," she praised "Like a Cloud" as the highlight of the album for "its trippy, ethereal washes of keyboard, masterful orchestration and tremolo guitar."

Retrospectively, Tom Demalon at AllMusic was less enthusiastic, giving the Choir one of the lowest ratings of any of their albums on that platform. Claiming that "there's just precious little on Speckled Bird to attract the listener's attention," he added that "the music is plodding and rather aimless, rarely achieving the evocative moodiness that the group seems to desire. Lyrically, the band's Christian leanings are subtly incorporated, but they often overly rely on repeated images such as flowers, clouds, and birds to define situations and relationships." Other critics have been more positive, particularly regarding the lyrical content, with Barry Alfonso pointing out that Speckled Bird "returned to themes of spiritual struggle and awakening on tracks like 'Gripped' and the title song." Powell, in the Encyclopedia of Contemporary Christian Music, was even more favorable, writing that the "album is beloved by critics as one of Christian music's ironic high points," and added that "themes of transcendent faith, hope, and love abound, amidst the realization that 'everyone travels in the wilderness.'"

=== Accolades ===
- CCM Magazine
  - Reader's Choice: Best Alternative Rock Album

== Track listing ==
All lyrics by Steve Hindalong and all music by Derri Daugherty, unless otherwise noted.

No.	Title	Lyrics	Music	Length
1.	"Speckled Bird"		Derri Daugherty, Steve Hindalong, Tim Chandler	3:44
2.	"Yellow Skies"			3:49
3.	"Like a Cloud"			2:06
4.	"Gripped"			4:20
5.	"Weather Girl"		Dan Michaels, Daugherty, Hindalong, Chandler	6:19
6.	"Wilderness"			4:03
7.	"Never More True"		Daugherty, Hindalong, Chandler	3:27
8.	"Spring"		Daugherty, Hindalong, Chandler	3:55
9.	"Grace"			3:06
10.	"Amazing"			3:40
11.	"Love Your Mind"		Daugherty, Hindalong, Chandler	5:24
12.	"Kissers and Killers"	Hindalong, Chandler	Daugherty, Hindalong, Chandler	2:55
Total length:				46:48

== Personnel ==
Personnel taken from Speckled Bird liner notes.

The Choir

- Derri Daugherty – lead vocals, guitars, bass guitar
- Steve Hindalong – drums, percussion
- Tim Chandler – bass guitar
- Dan Michaels - saxophone, Lyricon

Additional musicians

- Chris Colbert – guitar ("Amazing," "Kissers and Killers")
- Caryn Colbert – background vocals
- Jerry Chamberlain – background vocals
- Sharon McCall – background vocals

Production

- Derri Daugherty – producer, recording, mixing
- Steve Hindalong – producer
- Dave Hackbarth – recording, mixing
- Chris Colbert – recording, mixing
- Jr. McNeely – mixing ("Gripped," "Amazing")
- Doug Doyle – mastering (Digital Brothers)
- Leiza Schmidt – art direction, photography
- Gene Ray George – art layout, design assistance
- Lisa McDermott – cover model

== See also ==
- Kissers and Killers – the album upon which much of Speckled Bird is based
