= Between Thieves =

Between Thieves was a Christian musical group that formed in Keller, Texas in 1990. Their name represents the location of Jesus Christ at his death; "And with him they crucify two thieves; the one on his right hand, and the other on his left." They formed under the name Judah, and during both periods they were comparable to the Newsboys.

== Background ==
After producing two albums independently they signed with Tattoo Records in 1997, changing their name to Between Thieves. A CCM Magazine review of their eponymous Tattoo Records debut found that their music contained the best of both power pop and punk music. Their single "Despite The Rain" became a No. 1 hit on Christian radio, and the band toured with Code of Ethics.

The lyrics of Between Thieves spoke of general struggles of life and the frailty of the human spirit, retold New Testament parables, and generally had an evangelical focus. The band considered evangelism to be their primary function, and each live show included an altar call. Unfortunately for the band, extensive touring proved costly, and they lost three members within a year of its release.

Water, produced by Steve Hindalong, had a theme of renewal in times of trouble through Jesus Christ. Specifically, one reviewer found that the album contained "deeply personal" lyrics about God's providence and a general message "extolling Christ as God and Provider." The sound presented on the album also changed, showing a southern rock influence alongside their pop-punk roots.

Between Thieves played their final show on December 2, 2000, at Dreamworld Music Complex in Arlington, Texas. This was not only the band's farewell show, but also the opening night for the 1000 seat venue which was owned and operated by the band's bassist, River, and his older brother John. The band recorded the show for their final release, "Live". The album was released in 2001 and featured most of the final set including an introduction by Reggie Scott (The vocalist of one of the concerts opening bands, Rhythm), "Away With You" (a song that hadn't been played since Wesson and Davis had performed under the name "Judah"), "Break Me" and "Enemy" (two new songs that featured the band's recent shift to a heavier and slightly industrial vibe), and an instrumental jam simply listed as "Encore" which served as an extended intro to "Let Me See". A couple of months prior to the farewell show the band played an outside festival that was put on by a Dallas-based Christian rock radio station, 98.7 Power F.M. During the band's set a fan yelled a request for a performance of "Away With You". Guitarist, Josh Watkins responded by saying "You Know Better!". Before the band closed the main set of the final show with "Away With You" Watkins introduced the song by saying "This is a sentimental one that we're gonna do just for memory. Some of us don't even wanna do it, but it's for the people." The farewell show also featured a short acoustic set in the middle of the show which consisted of only Wesson on Vocals, Davis on hand percussion & backing vocals, and Watkins on acoustic guitar. They played "Take My Hand" and a couple of worship songs. The acoustic portion of the show was not included on the "Live" album. Video of the concert was also recorded, intended for a corresponding concert film, however the video footage was never released to the public.

== Discography ==
As Judah

- 1994: Simplistic (independent)
- 1996: Lay It Down

As Between Thieves

- 1997: Between Thieves (Tattoo Records)
- 1998: Water
- 2001: Live

== Members ==
Final lineup

- Jason Wesson – lead vocals
- Jason "J.D." Davis – drums, backing vocals, percussion, & samples
- Josh Watkins – guitar, backing vocals (1997–1999, 1999–2000)
- River Tunnell – bass (2000)
- Kane Kelly – guitar (2000)

Previous members

- Jimmy Varner – guitars & backing vocals ( –1997)
- Jesse Reeves – bass ( –1997)
- Aron Vaughn – keyboards & synthesizers ( –1997)
- James Yourman – bass (1998–1999)
