= Mark Tedder =

- Born: Mark Anthony Tedder; January 21, 1962 (age 64); Little Rock, Arkansas
- Origin: Colorado Springs, Colorado
- Genres: CCM, worship
- Occupations: Singer, songwriter, worship leader
- Instruments: vocals, guitar
- Years active: 2005–present
- Labels: Integrity, Kingsway
- Website: worshiplanet.com

Mark Anthony Tedder (born January 21, 1962) is an American Christian musician, worship leader, and guitarist, who primarily plays a contemporary Christian style of worship music. He has released four albums, and an extended play.

== Early life ==
Mark Anthony Tedder was born on January 21, 1962, in Little Rock, Arkansas, whose musical inspiration started with playing drums, while in high school. He has lived all over the world from the United Kingdom, Russia, and Czech Republic, where he helped spread the Gospel truths. Tedder is the uncle of Ryan Tedder of OneRepublic.

== Music career ==
His music recording career began in 2005, with the album, Worshiplanet, that was released by Kingsway Music, on December 9, 2005. He released, Pilgrims Journey, on November 17, 2006, with Kingsway Music. The third album, The Door: Live Worship From Beijing, China, was released independently on December 1, 2008. His subsequent album, Restore, was released on October 18, 2010, from Integrity Music. He released, an extended play, Atmosphere, independently on May 31, 2013.

== Personal life ==
Tedder resides in Colorado Springs, Colorado, with his wife, Carrie, and their two sons, Ben and Daniel.

== Discography ==
Albums

- Worshiplanet (December 9, 2005, Kingsway)
- Pilgrims Journey (November 17, 2006, Kingsway)
- The Door (December 1, 2008, independent)
- Restore (October 18, 2010, Integrity)

EPs

- Atmosphere (May 31, 2013, independent)
