= Circle Slide =

Studio album by The Choir
- Released: October 23, 1990
- Recorded: 1990
- Studios: Neverland Studios, Cerritos, California
- Genres: Alternative rock; Christian alternative rock
- Length: 39:22
- Labels: Myrrh/Epic (1990); Galaxy21 (2015)
- Producers: Derri Daugherty; Steve Hindalong

The Choir chronology
Wide-Eyed Wonder (1989)	Circle Slide (1990)	Kissers and Killers (1993)

Alternative cover
- The 25th Anniversary Edition CD cover.

Singles from Circle Slide
- 1. "Restore My Soul" Released: December 17, 1990; 2. "About Love" Released: May 6, 1991

Circle Slide is the sixth studio release, and fifth full-length studio album, from alternative rock band the Choir, released in 1990. Considered by some critics to be the band's best album, and even called "one of the best Christian albums ever made," Circle Slide was listed at No. 53 in the book CCM Presents: The 100 Greatest Albums in Christian Music. This would be the final album the Choir would record for Myrrh Records.

== Background ==
Despite Wide-Eyed Wonder's positive themes of new fatherhood and family relationships, Myrrh Records' substantial promotion of the album, and the resultant high-profile tour with heavy media coverage, it was a period of personal turmoil for every member of the Choir. The extensive time spent in a crowded van for months at a time took its toll on the band's relationship with bass guitarist Robin Spurs, who quit the Choir during the recording of Circle Slide. She initially returned to her custom jewelry business, then later joined Rachel Rachel on tour to support their debut album. While drummer and lyricist Steve Hindalong initially claimed that Spurs would "ultimately hate us," the band reconciled with her many years later, expressing fond affection for one another, and performed together for the Wide-Eyed Wonder anniversary tour in 2017.

Hindalong's marriage was also under considerable strain due to his extensive time on the road away from his family, and that would be reflected in the lyrics of Circle Slide, which would musically return to the moody soundscapes the band first explored on Chase the Kangaroo. Saxophone and Lyricon player Dan Michaels, who at that time lived in an area of Pomona, California with a high incidence of illegal drug activity, was struggling financially to the point where he was forced to search sofa cushions for spare change so he and Adam Again frontman Gene Eugene could play racquetball at a public coin-operated facility late at night. Finally, lead singer and guitarist Derri Daugherty was grappling with equipment issues, including being unable to repair his most prized guitar amps when they failed during recording.

== Recording and production ==
After the Choir's support of Russ Taff on his tour for The Way Home had concluded, the band once again returned to Neverland Studios in May 1990 to self-produce their next album with long-time Choir engineer Dave Hackbarth as co-producer. After Spurs' official departure, the band was once again left without a full-time bassist, prompting Hindalong to later joke that "bass has been the revolving door in this band." While Spurs would contribute to three tracks, the remainder of the album's bass duties were handled by Daugherty, David Miner and Mike Saeurbrey, the latter of whom returned to play on the album's first single, "Restore My Soul." Mark Heard, Jerry Chamberlain, Sharon McCall and Steve Griffith also returned to contribute vocals and production assistance. According to Hindalong, Circle Slide took 10 weeks to record and complete.

== Composition ==
=== Music ===
Unlike the pop sensibilities of Wide-Eyed Wonder, Circle Slide was a return to "longer, ethereal jams that conveyed a sense of longing for rest, for peace of mind, [and] for security." To that end, the album kicked off with the title track, which ran for more than seven minutes. Tom Willett, the band's A&R rep, was taken aback upon first listen: "It’s a shock for the record company guy to go, 'where’s the chorus? We’re 40 seconds in, there should have been a chorus by now,' [but] I ended up liking the statement it made: 'we’re in no rush, just sit back.'" Originally envisioned with an extended opening sequence of guitar feedback, the band abandoned that idea and kicked things off with a programmed snare roll instead. Inspired by a technique used by the Church on their album Starfish, Daugherty and Hindalong opted to bring the song to complete silence two-thirds of the way in before amping up again. Because the mixing board was not automated, this effort had to be done manually with multiple people. Both Daugherty and Hindalong consider this their favorite moment on the album.

Much like they did on Chase the Kangaroo, the Choir continued to experiment with various recording techniques on Circle Slide: running Michaels' sax solo on "If I Had a Yard" through a wah-wah pedal; sampling Daugherty's vocals into a synthesizer that was then played by Hindalong on "A Sentimental Song"; combining the laughter of Hindalong's daughter Emily with a recording of his Honda motorcycle for "Laugh Loop"; and using alternating acoustic guitar lines that went back and forth between the left and right speakers on "Merciful Eyes."

Although the album was not as radio-friendly as Wide-Eyed Wonder, both Hindalong and Daugherty claimed that, in regards to "A Sentimental Song" in particular, "if there’s one thing that’s the strength of our band, the Choir, it would be the melodies."

=== Lyrics ===
"Sometimes maybe our music is too personal, too honest, too specific. Some people complain that we intentionally try to be ambiguous. I do not. I definitely do not want for people to be left out. I just try to stick to details. I think the closer you stick to details, the more original the song is."

— Steve Hindalong in 1991, on songwriting for the Choir

As was becoming standard practice for the Choir, the lyrics on Circle Slide reflected what was going on in Hindalong's life at that time. As he explained, "I don’t know even how to write songs about other people’s problems. It’s funny to me that so much of music in Christian circles are about other people's problems, about how to fix other people. And If I can find something profound, looking honestly at myself, maybe it'll inspire somebody and it'll touch something in them."

Because of the impact of the band's non-stop touring and recording, Hindalong's marriage was "in crisis," and this informed many of the tracks on the album. "A Sentimental Song" was written as apology to his then-wife, Nancy. "I still sometimes cry when I play this song live," Hindalong said. "I feel sad; I love Nancy, but I've hurt her a lot. And she's hurt me, too—like we do to each other, the people that we're closest to." "About Love" was written on the day the band left to go on tour for Wide-Eyed Wonder, "when Emily was just about a year old. Nancy was pregnant; I had just found out about a day before we left. We both cried." The original lyric to the chorus was, "there’s something pitiful about love," but at the last minute, Hindalong changed it to "'there’s something wonderful about love,' as it's about the irony and the tension." "Merciful Eyes" addressed infidelity, "and how sometimes we avoid eye contact with God, which makes it easier for us to rationalize our misbehavior."

Bracketing these songs of domestic discord were two tracks that expressed optimism in the face of difficulty: "Circle Slide" was inspired by Hindalong's childhood memories of amusement park slides that one would ride down on gunny sacks. A non-stop circular slide that didn't require climbing back up to repeatedly ride would be "the closest thing to heaven that I could imagine," Hindalong said. The album's closing track, "Restore My Soul," expressed hope in the process of Christian sanctification. "We like to say that we talk about heaven and we talk about earth," Hindalong explained. "We don't talk about heaven on earth, because we don’t think that exists."

== Artwork and packaging ==
Inspired by the lyrics of "Blue Skies," the cover art for Circle Slide was a sepia-toned photograph of a diorama, which featured a lone tree with a tire swing in front of approaching storm clouds. Hindalong initially drew out the idea on a napkin for art director John Flynn, who then worked with photographer Susan Goines to bring the tableaux to life, as this was prior to the common use of digital tools for photo editing and compositing; it was "an expensive proposition" that the band estimated cost $3,000. As he did with the liner notes for Chase the Kangaroo, Hindalong hand-wrote the lettering for the front and back cover of the album. No photographs of the band members were featured on the front cover, and no studio album from the Choir has since.

For the remastered 25th Anniversary Edition of the album released in 2015, the CD cover art featured an alternate full-color photograph of the diorama, while the vinyl release simply reproduced the original cover art.

== Release ==
The original title for the album was Laugh Loop, and this was even written on the final master tapes delivered to Myrrh. However, Willett insisted the band use another song title for the album, so Circle Slide was ultimately selected.

The newly-retitled album was released on October 23, 1990, on CD and cassette. The first single released from Circle Slide was the heavy, rhythm-driven "Restore My Soul," which peaked at No. 3 on the Christian rock charts on January 28, 1991, "an amazing feat for a song six and-a-half minutes long." The band's follow up single, "About Love," was the album's second top ten hit, peaking at No. 6 on June 3, 1991. Although Circle Slide was more lyrically somber than Wide-Eyed Wonder, it ended up being the band's best-selling album for Myrrh.

By the release of this album, Myrrh had inked a new distribution deal with Epic Records, and Epic released Circle Slide to mainstream record stores in April 1991. Unlike the custom EP that A&M worked to college rock stations for Wide-Eyed Wonder, Epic simply released "Restore My Soul" as a single to mainstream rock stations, which met with little success.

The band's continued dissatisfaction with the contemporary Christian music industry where their music could only get limited exposure led Choir manager Paul Emery to issue a press release saying, "The band has grown frustrated with the constraints of a marketplace that values spiritual slogans over musical creativity." Hindalong would later deny that the band "hated Christian music and would never do it again," but did confirm that the Choir was "in pursuit of secular distribution." He added, "We're not bitter and frustrated; we're just trying to broaden our audience." Circle Slide would turn out to be the band's final release for a major Christian label, and it wouldn't be until 1993's Kissers and Killers that the Choir would aggressively pursue a mainstream record deal.

=== 25th anniversary remaster (2015) ===
In 2015, Circle Slide was remastered and released as a 25th Anniversary Edition. It was issued on vinyl for the first time, and the CD release was a two-disc set that featured a second CD with audio commentary on every track from Daugherty, Hindalong, Michaels and Willett, the latter of whom originally signed the Choir to Myrrh_{LA}.

== Tours ==
=== Circle Slide tour ===
Sauerbrey officially rejoined the Choir as bass guitarist when the band began touring in support of this album, and he remained an official member of the band for the next two years. The Circle Slide tour was the first time that the Choir toured as a five-member unit, as Sauerbrey recruited guitarist Billy Sammons (or "Billy Wilde," as Daugherty re-named him) to the band, so that the Choir could add more of their more musically complex songs to their set list. Sauerbrey would later say, "We were a lean, tight band that could anticipate each other live. I would sometimes simultaneously change the tempo [...] completely unplanned, and the rest of the band didn't even miss a beat." Reviews at the time noted the dynamic nature of this road incarnation of the Choir.

=== 25th anniversary tour ===
With the release of the remastered 25th Anniversary Edition of Circle Slide, the band embarked on a three-month tour in the spring of 2015 on which they played the entire album in its entirety, along with selected songs from the Choir's repertoire. For this tour, the 77's frontman Michael Roe joined the band as their bass guitarist, and also served as the Choir's opening act, where he played songs from the 77's album Pray Naked.

== Critical reception ==
Professional ratings
Review scores
Source	Rating
CCM Magazine	Favorable
Cross Rhythms	9/10 stars
The Wichita Eagle	5/6 stars
Kansas State Collegian	A
Calgary Herald	Mixed
Kitchener-Waterloo Record	Mixed
AllMusic	4.5/5 stars

Circle Slide is listed at No. 53 in the book CCM Presents: The 100 Greatest Albums in Christian Music. In that entry, critic Anthony DeBarros wrote that Circle Slide was "an album that stands as one of Christian music's rare blends of artistic sensibility and pop accessibility," and added that it was "a milestone in the genre and one of the band's greatest accomplishments."

Circle Slide was highly praised by critics in both the US and the UK upon its release. Brian Q. Newcomb, writing for CCM Magazine, called Circle Slide the Choir's "best record yet," and a "mature, and utterly authentic response to the music of the times." Highlighting the two songs that kick off the album, Newcomb stated that they establish "a unique and important perspective to which all previous efforts pointed and all future efforts will be judged." Tony Cummings, writing for Cross Rhythms, agreed, and said that "[the] Choir's albums are of a consistent quality whatever the current line up, and this could turn out to be their best," adding that, "the visionary title track and the billowing 'Restore My Soul' [...] are intelligent alternatives to the cliché strewn vistas of much CCM." These adulations were echoed by writer Rebecca Sack for the Kansas State Collegian, who said that Circle Slide was "a visionary trip through essential humanness as it interfaces with a spiritual reality," adding that the Choir "achieves an incredible beauty in this work, while maintaining a certain realism in which the lyrics discuss despairing situations as well as hopeful remedies that may be successful if implemented over a lifetime."

The Choir also received a number of end-of-year accolades from a variety of Christian publications—most notably, the aforementioned CCM Magazine, where the Choir was chosen by readers as the best alternative rock band for a second year in a row. Similar sentiments were expressed by the teen music panel in The Wichita Eagle, where Circle Slide was a "big hit," and five of the six panelists encouraged readers to purchase the album. Panelist Nick Nave said the album proved the Choir was "one of the best alternative bands around—Christian or otherwise," while panelist Bill Crispen called Circle Slide "a well-composed, electrifying but calm pool of emotion."

Reaction from Canadian music critics at the time was less enthusiastic. Frank King, writing for the Calgary Herald, said the "music represents out-takes from a Daniel Lanois album," although he added that his criticisms of the album's "muddy" production were not to be taken negatively. And Nell Randall, writing for the Kitchener-Waterloo Record, said that Circle Slide was "pretty good," but while "there's enough going on in the rhythm section alone to merit multiple listenings," it "somehow doesn't hang together."

Regardless, the album's positive assessment has only grown in retrospect. Barry Alfonso, writing in The Billboard Guide to Contemporary Christian Music, stated that Circle Slide "surrounded such expressions of faith as 'Merciful Eyes' and 'Restore My Soul' with a spacey sort of pop/rock that was definitely ahead of its time." John Joseph Thompson in his book Raised by Wolves: The Story of Christian Rock & Roll agreed, saying that with Circle Slide, the Choir "simply soared." Mark Allan Powell's assessment of Circle Slide in the Encyclopedia of Contemporary Christian Music was more scholarly, writing that "the album opens with a seven and-a-half minute opus that doesn't sound very happy, but actually expresses a hopeful philosophy of life." He added that "the song is immediately offset by the next tune, 'If I Had a Yard,' which reveals that the band members' check-to-check existence does not yet afford them suburban circumstances that allow room for a swingset (or a circle slide)." Powell pointed out that this conflict was informed by the band's Episcopalian leanings, which reflect "an appreciation for existentialist realism and an understanding of dialectical tensions." Mark Allender, writing for AllMusic, called Circle Slide the band's "strongest effort" with "lyrics that are stronger than ever," and summed up, saying, "the only thing wrong with this recording is that there is simply not enough of it. Clocking in at under 40 minutes, the music leaves the listener hungry for more."

=== Accolades ===
- CCM Magazine
  - No. 1 Favorite Rock/Alternative Artist or Band
  - No. 2 Rock/Alternative Album
- Campus Life
  - Album of the Year
- Harvest Rock Syndicate
  - Artist of the Year
  - Alternative Album of the Year
  - Song of the Year ("Restore My Soul")
- Notebored Magazine
  - No. 3 Album of the Year
  - Alternative Artist of the Year

=== Legacy ===
- Circle Slide was the inspiration for the name of the Christian alternative rock band Circleslide, which formed in 1999.
- A Circle Slide T-shirt was worn by actor Brandon Call in a two-part episode of the Hulk Hogan-led TV series Thunder in Paradise, as well as the CD-interactive video game based on the series.

== Track listing ==
All lyrics by Steve Hindalong. All music by Derri Daugherty and Hindalong.

No.	Title	Length
1.	"Circle Slide"	7:23
2.	"If I Had a Yard"	4:16
3.	"A Sentimental Song"	5:01
4.	"Merciful Eyes"	4:55
5.	"Tear for Tear"	1:20
6.	"About Love"	4:03
7.	"Blue Skies"	4:04
8.	"Laugh Loop"	1:46
9.	"Restore My Soul"	6:34
Total length:		39:22

25th anniversary remaster – Vinyl (Side one)
No.	Title	Length
1.	"Circle Slide"	7:23
2.	"If I Had a Yard"	4:16
3.	"A Sentimental Song"	5:01
4.	"Merciful Eyes"	4:55

25th anniversary remaster – Vinyl (Side two)
No.	Title	Length
1.	"Tear for Tear"	1:22
2.	"About Love"	4:04
3.	"Blue Skies"	4:05
4.	"Laugh Loop"	1:45
5.	"Restore My Soul"	6:23
Total length:		39:14

25th anniversary remaster – Band Commentary (CD disc 2)
No.	Title	Length
1.	"Circle Slide [Band Commentary]"	7:26
2.	"If I Had a Yard [Band Commentary]"	4:18
3.	"A Sentimental Song [Band Commentary]"	5:04
4.	"Merciful Eyes [Band Commentary]"	4:57
5.	"Tear for Tear [Band Commentary]"	1:24
6.	"About Love [Band Commentary]"	4:03
7.	"Blue Skies [Band Commentary]"	4:10
8.	"Laugh Loop [Band Commentary]"	1:47
9.	"Restore My Soul [Band Commentary]"	6:34
Total length:		39:43

== Personnel ==
Personnel taken from Circle Slide liner notes.

The Choir

- Derri Daugherty – lead vocals, guitars, bass guitar, keyboards, e-bow
- Steve Hindalong – drums, percussion, harmonica, tambourine, keyboards (voice keys), vocals, additional sounds
- Dan Michaels – saxophone, Lyricon

Additional musicians

- Robin Spurs – bass guitar ("If I Had a Yard," "Merciful Eyes," "About Love"), vocals ("About Love")
- Mike Sauerbrey – bass guitar ("Restore My Soul")
- David Miner – acoustic bass ("Blue Skies")
- Mark Heard – background vocals ("About Love")
- Jerry Chamberlain – background vocals ("Merciful Eyes")
- Sharon McCall – background vocals ("A Sentimental Song")
- Nancy Hindalong – spoken words "and purple flowers" ("If I Had a Yard")
- Emily Hindalong – laugh tracks ("If I Had a Yard," "Laugh Loop")

Production

- Tom Willett – executive producer
- Derri Daugherty – producer
- Steve Hindalong – producer
- Dave Hackbarth – co-producer, recording, additional mixing
- Steve Griffith – mixing (Clear Mix)
- Steve Hall – mastering (Future Disc)
- John Flynn – art direction, design (F2 Design)
- Susan Goines – photograph
- Roz – associate art director
- Paul Emery – manager
- Nigel Palmer – remastering (Lowland Masters) [2015 remaster]
- Tommy Carnes – commentary engineering [2015 remaster]
