= Mark Allan Powell =

American New Testament scholar

Mark Allan Powell is an American New Testament scholar and professional music critic.

== New Testament scholarship ==
Powell was Professor of New Testament at Trinity Lutheran Seminary in Columbus, Ohio until his retirement in 2018. He is editor of the HarperCollins Bible Dictionary and author of more than 100 articles and 35 books on the Bible and religion, including a widely used textbook, Introducing the New Testament (Baker Academic, 2009; 2nd ed., 2018).

Powell has held a number of positions in the academic guild of theological studies. From 1992 to 1996, he served as co-chair of The Matthew Group, a section of the Society of Biblical Literature devoted to the study of Matthew's Gospel, and from 2000 to 2006, he served as Chair of The Historical Jesus Section for that same organization. He has also served for many years as editor of the Society of Biblical Literature's dissertation series (Academia Biblica), and he has been on the editorial boards of numerous professional journals, including Catholic Biblical Quarterly, Journal of Biblical Literature, and Word and World. He is one of the founding editors of the Journal for the Study of the Historical Jesus.

Powell's primary contributions in the field of biblical/theological studies have been in three areas: the application of modern literary criticism to the Bible, the interpretation of the Gospel of Matthew as a product of early Christian formation developing out of Judaism, and the scholarly appraisal of what can be reliably known about Jesus through the application of traditional historical methodology.

Powell is best known to many students of religion as the author of a few widely used textbooks. His Introducing the New Testament (Baker Academic 2009; 2nd. ed., 2018), is designed to serve as a college textbook for survey courses on the New Testament. It is descriptive in tone, avoiding stands on contentious issues; well illustrated with color reproductions of artwork from various cultures depicting New Testament themes; and is filled with hyperlinks to a website (www.IntroducingNT.com)" offering extensive printable material, including hundreds of supplemental essays and bibliographies. Powell's What Is Narrative Criticism? (Fortress Press, 1990) is a standard work for introducing students to modern literary criticism and its application to the Gospels. His Jesus as a Figure in History (Westminster/John Knox, 1998; 2nd ed., 2012) is the standard text for many institutions that feature history courses on Jesus or Christian origins. Another book, Fortress Introduction to the Gospels (Fortress Press, 1998; 2nd ed. 2020) is often used at a graduate level for courses focusing on the distinctive characteristics and theological messages of the four New Testament Gospels.

== Popular Christian writings ==
Powell has also written books in the areas of spiritual formation (Loving Jesus), stewardship (Giving To God), and homiletics (What Do They Hear?: Bridging the Gap between Pulpit and Pew). A set of DVDs called How Lutherans Understand the Bible received widespread use throughout the Evangelical Lutheran Church in America and were excerpted for inclusion in the Lutheran Study Bible (Augsburg Fortress). An ecumenical, global scholar, Powell served for many years as a Protestant on the executive committee of the Catholic Biblical Association, and taught at seminaries in Estonia, Russia, and Tanzania.

== Music criticism ==
Powell has also worked as a professional music critic, with numerous published reviews in the fields of rock and pop music. The two fields of music criticism and religious scholarship come together in his 1200-page volume Encyclopedia of Contemporary Christian Music (Hendrickson, 2000), a critical survey and analysis of artists in both the religious and mainstream markets who have produced faith-oriented products.

== Personal information ==
Powell was born in Gainesville, Florida in 1953 and ordained as a minister of the American Lutheran Church (now the Evangelical Lutheran Church in America) in 1980. He married Melissa Curtis Powell in 1995.

== Education ==
- 1975 BA Texas Lutheran College (Seguin, Texas)
- 1980 M.Div. Trinity Lutheran Seminary (Columbus, Ohio)
- 1987 Ph.D. Union Theological Seminary

== Awards and honors ==
- 2006 Award of Merit–Biblical Interpretation Article: "Where You Put Your Treasure" in The Lutheran (Associated Press in Religion)
- 2003 Award of Merit –Denominational Feature Article: "Contemporary Christian Music: What Can We Learn?" in Lutheran Partners (Associated Press in Religion)
- 2003 Book of the Year: Encyclopedia of Contemporary Christian Music (Association of Recorded Sound Collections)
- 2000 Award of Excellence –Biographical Profile: "Marsha's Tears: An Orphan of the Church" in Christian Century (Associated Press in Religion)
- 1998 Endowed Chair in New Testament (Trinity Lutheran Seminary)
- 1989 Outstanding Young Graduate Award (Texas Lutheran College)

== Bibliography ==
- Matthew. Interpretation Bible Commentary. Louisville: Westminster John Knox, 2023.
- Fortress Introduction to the Gospel. Revised and Expanded Second Edition. Minneapolis: Fortress, 2020.
- Introducción al Nuevo Testamento. Grand Rapids: Baker Academic, 2019.
- Introducing the New Testament. Revised Second Edition. Grand Rapids: Baker Academic, 2018.
- Jesus as Israel's Messiah: Engaging the Work of N. T. Wright and E. P. Sanders. Brill, 2015. Co-editor and Co-author.
- Jesus as a Figure in History: Fully Revised and Expanded Second Edition. Louisville: Westminster John Knox, 2013
- Harper Collins Bible Dictionary. Revised Third Edition. San Francisco: HarperSanFrancisco, 2011. General Editor.
- Faith and Historical Jesus Research. Brill, 2011.
- Harper Collins Bible Dictionary. Condensed Edition. San Francisco: HarperSanFrancisco, 2009. Editor.
- Introducing the New Testament. Grand Rapids: Baker Academic, 2009.
- Methods for Matthew. Cambridge Methods in Biblical Interpretation. Cambridge: Cambridge University Press, 2009. Editor and co-author.
- Opening the Book of Faith: Lutheran Insights for Bible Study. Minneapolis: Augsburg Fortress, 2008. With Diane Jacobson and Stan Olson.
- What Do They Hear?: How To Bridge the Gap Between Preacher and Pew. Nashville: Abingdon, 2007
- Giving To God: The Good News of Biblical Stewardship. Grand Rapids: Eerdmans, 2005.
- Loving Jesus. Minneapolis: Fortress, 2004.
- Encyclopedia of Contemporary Christian Music. Boston: Hendrickson, 2002
- Chasing the Eastern Star: Adventures in Biblical Reader-Response Criticism. Louisville: Westminster/John Knox Press, 2001
- Matthew. The Harper-Collins Bible Commentary Series. San Francisco: Harper-Collins, 2000.
- Who Do You Say That I Am? Essays on New Testament Christology. With David R. Bauer. Louisville: Westminster/John Knox Press, 1999.
- The New Testament Today. Louisville: Westminster/John Knox Press, 1999.
- The Jesus Debate: Modern Historians Investigate the Life of Christ. Oxford: Lion Publishing Co., 1999
- Mark: God's Grace in Action. Inspire Series. Minneapolis: Augsburg Publishing House, 1998.
- Jesus As A Figure in History: How Modern Historians View the Man from Galilee. Louisville: Westminster/John Knox Press, 1998.
- A Fortress Introduction to ... The Gospels. Minneapolis: Fortress Press, 1998.
- Epiphany, Proclamation 6 – Series B. Minneapolis: Fortress Press, 1996.
- Treasures New and Old: Essays on the Gospel of Matthew. With David R. Bauer. Atlanta: Scholars Press, 1996.
- God With Us: A Pastoral Theology of Matthew's Gospel. Minneapolis: Fortress Press, 1995.
- What Is Narrative Criticism? A New Approach to the Bible. British edition, with foreword by N. T. Wright. London: SPCK, 1993.
- The Bible and Modern Literary Criticism: A Critical Assessment and Annotated Bibliography. New York: Greenwood Press, 1992.
- Advent/Christmas. Proclamation 5 – Series A. Minneapolis: Fortress Press, 1992.
- What Are They Saying About Acts? New York: Paulist Press, 1991.
- Witnesses to the Word: Mission 90 Bible Study/Witness. Minneapolis: Augsburg Publishing House, 1991. Editor and co-author.
- What Is Narrative Criticism? Guides to Biblical Scholarship Series. Minneapolis: Fortress Press, 1990.
- What Are They Saying About Luke? New York: Paulist Press, 1989.
