= Steve Hindalong =

American drummer

- Born: November 29, 1959 (age 66)
- Genre: Christian rock
- Occupations: Songwriter, producer
- Instruments: Drums, percussion
- Years active: 1986–present

Steve Hindalong (born November 29, 1959) is an American drummer, percussionist, songwriter and producer best known for his work with the alternative rock band the Choir. Since 2006, he has also been an official member of the alternative country supergroup Lost Dogs.

After becoming a prolific producer in the late 1990s, Hindalong received several Dove awards (2001 and 2003, "Special Event Album of the Year") for his work on the City on a Hill project. He also co-wrote "God of Wonders" with Marc Byrd, which was used by NASA to wake up Discovery astronaut Michael Fossum.

== Discography ==
=== The Choir ===
- Shades of Gray (1986) – producer, songwriter, drums, percussion
- Diamonds and Rain (1986) – songwriter, drums, percussion
- Chase the Kangaroo (1987) – producer, songwriter, drums
- Wide-Eyed Wonder (1989) – producer, songwriter, drums
- Circle Slide (1990) – producer, songwriter, drums
- Kissers and Killers (1993) – producer, songwriter, drums, percussion, harmonica, vocals
- Speckled Bird (1995) – producer, songwriter, drums, percussion, backing vocals
- Free Flying Soul (1996) – producer, songwriter, drums, percussion, child's piano, Kenyan whistle, vocals
- Flap Your Wings (2000) – producer, songwriter, drums, percussion
- Oh How the Mighty Have Fallen (2005) – producer, songwriter, drums, percussion
- Burning Like the Midnight Sun (2010) – producer, songwriter, drums, percussion
- De-Plumed (2011) – producer, songwriter, drums, percussion
- The Loudest Sound Ever Heard (2012) – producer, songwriter, drums, percussion
- Shadow Weaver (2014) – producer, songwriter, drums, percussion
- Deep Cuts (2021) – producer, songwriter, drums, percussion

=== Solo credits ===
- To Hell with the Devil (1996), Flying Tart
- Skinny (1998), Cadence Records
- The Warbler (2016)

=== Performing credits ===
- Ideola – Tribal Opera, Mark Heard (1987) – digital sampling
- Briefing for the Ascent, Terry Scott Taylor (1987) – drums
- Pain, Veil of Ashes (1989) – background vocals
- Big Big Town, Riki Michele (1989) – songwriter, cymbal overdubs, percussion, harmonica, acoustic guitar, jingly stick
- Homeboys, Adam Again (1990) – songwriter, drums
- Dr. Edward Daniel Taylor: The Miracle Faith Telethon, Terry Scott Taylor (1990) – drums
- At the Foot of the Cross -Volume 1- Clouds, Rain, Fire (1991) – producer, songwriter, drums, percussion
- Second Hand, Mark Heard (1991) – drums
- Holes in the Floor of Heaven, Ric Alba (1991) – producer, acoustic guitar, drums, percussion
- Poplife, Lifesavers (1991) – drums
- Just Keep Going On, Rev. Dan Smith (1992) – percussion, hand claps
- The Embarrassing Young, John Austin (1992) – producer, drums, percussion
- The Grape Prophet, L.S.U. (1992) – percussion, voice of Grape Prophet
- Plague of Ethyls, Plague of Ethyls (1992) – producer, drums, percussion
- Motorcycle, Daniel Amos (1993) – drums, percussion
- Orphans And Angels, Julie Miller (1993) – percussion
- Brow Beat Unplugged Alternative (1993) – percussion
- Shawl, The Prayer Chain (1993) – producer, shaker, tambourine, harmonica
- Mindsize, Poor Old Lu (1993) – percussion
- High Noon, Mark Heard (1994) – drums
- Grace Shaker, L.S.U. (1994) – cat food tin, plastic waste receptacle
- Mercury, The Prayer Chain (1995) – producer, percussion, Vox Continental organ
- Skywire, Common Children (1996) – producer, percussion, toy piano
- Antarctica, The Prayer Chain (1996) – producer, percussion
- All Star United, All Star United (1997) – percussion
- Images of Faith, Marty McCall (1997) – drums, percussion
- Redemption, White Heart (1997) – percussion
- Delicate Fade, Common Children (1997) – producer, percussion
- International Anthems for the Human Race, All Star United (1998) – percussion
- Back From Nowhere, Polarboy (1998) – percussion
- Starlight Wishlist, Glisten (1998) – percussion
- Worldwide Favorites, Adam Again (1999) – songwriter, drums
- Transparent, Broomtree (1999) – percussion
- Homeboys / Dig, Adam Again (2000) – songwriter, drums
- When Worlds Collide: A Tribute to Daniel Amos (2000) – percussion
- Live in Nash-Vegas, Michael Knott (2000) – percussion
- Live at Cornerstone 2000, Adam Again (2001) – songwriter, vocals
- Chasing the Horizon, Mitch McVicker (2001) – percussion
- The Inbetween Time, Common Children (2001) – percussion
- Random Acts & Hodgepodge, Terry Scott Taylor (2002) – songwriter, vocals
- Nazarene Crying Towel, Lost Dogs (2003) – percussion
- Sound of Melodies, Leeland (2006) – percussion
- R U Ready , Godfrey Birtill (2008) – percussion

=== Producing/songwriting credits ===
- Ten Songs by Adam Again, Adam Again (1988) – songwriter
- Whirlpool EP, The Prayer Chain (1992) – producer
- Shawl, The Prayer Chain (1993) – producer
- Mercury, The Prayer Chain (1995) – producer, songwriter on "Bendy Line"
- Super Deluxe, Morella's Forest (1995) – producer
- Skywire, Common Children (1996) – producer
- The Violet Burning, The Violet Burning (1996) – producer
- Grace and Dire Circumstances (cover of "Chase the Kangaroo"), Farewell to Juliet (1998) – songwriter
- Water – Between Thieves (1998) – producer
- Starlight Wishlist, Glisten (1998) – producer
- In the Company of Angels, Caedmon's Call (2001) – producer, songwriter
- Invade My Soul, By The Tree (2002) – producer
- Invisible Empires, Sara Groves (2011) – producer
