= Bloodshot (The Choir album) =

Studio album by The Choir
- Released: June 1, 2018
- Recorded: 2018
- Studios: Yackland, Nashville, Tennessee; Neverland Studios, Cerritos, California
- Genres: Alternative rock; indie rock
- Length: 46:36
- Label: Galaxy21
- Producer: Stephen Leiweke

The Choir chronology
The Livestream Bootleg (2015)	Bloodshot (2018)	Kissers and Killers - The Acoustic Sessions (2018)

The Choir studio albums chronology
Shadow Weaver (2014)	Bloodshot (2018)	Deep Cuts (2021)

Bloodshot is the 17th studio release, and 15th full-length studio album, by alternative rock band the Choir, released in 2018. This was the final studio album to feature bass guitarist Tim Chandler, who died in October that same year.

== Background ==
The four years that followed the release of Shadow Weaver were a tumultuous period for the band, particularly for lead singer and guitarist Derri Daugherty and drummer and lyricist Steve Hindalong. Daugherty temporarily relocated from Nashville, Tennessee to Cerritos, California, to take care of his ailing father until his death in 2017. Hindalong's 34-year marriage, frequently addressed in many of the band's songs, finally ended in divorce. Guitarist Marc Byrd and his wife Christine Glass Byrd, the latter of whom provided background vocals on several of the Choir's studio albums, left the band permanently. And bassist Tim Chandler's health began to decline, and he died just four months after the release of this album.

Despite their personal turmoil, Daugherty and Hindalong were highly productive during this period. Daugherty recorded two new solo albums, Hush Sorrow (2016) and The Color of Dreams (2019). In addition, he re-released the 2002 EP A Few Unfinished Songs with six additional tracks in 2015. Daugherty's side project Kerosene Halo—a partnership with the 77s' Michael Roe—generated two new studio releases in 2016, House on Fire and Live Simple.

Hindalong released his second solo album The Warbler in 2016, with a title inspired by the final track on the Choir's 1996 release Free Flying Soul, a song which was also re-recorded to close the new album. He also contributed percussion to a number of releases by Phil Madeira, including the group project Mercyland—Hymns for the Rest of Us, Vol. No 2, which featured Emmylou Harris and David Crowder. Hindalong and Daugherty would also provide production and musical contributions to several other artists during this period, including Kevin Max, Jesse Sprinkle, Wayne Everett, the Prayer Chain, Solveig Leithaug, and to the final studio recording from Dead Artist Syndrome, Kissing Strangers (2015).

After a successful Kickstarter campaign to crowdfund their previous album Shadow Weaver, the Choir briefly shifted to PledgeMusic to finance Bloodshot and the remastered re-release of Wide-Eyed Wonder. Due to artist payment issues with the PledgeMusic platform, the Choir would return to Kickstarter to crowdfund all future studio albums and re-releases.

== Recording and production ==
Due to Daugherty's role as caregiver for his ailing father, the production of this album was split between Nashville and Neverland Studios in Southern California, where Circle Slide and Kissers and Killers were recorded. Hindalong "went back and forth a lot," and both he and Daugherty wrote a number of songs together in California, including "Bloodshot Eyes" and "Summer Rain."

To manage this process, the Choir opted to hire Steven Leiweke as producer, the first outside producer the band had used since Byrd handled those duties for O How the Mighty Have Fallen 13 years prior. "At this time, it was really nice, with Derri and me in two different cities. The timing was right to have an outside voice," Hindalong said. "That was great, because I didn't have to worry about any of the technical engineering things," Daugherty added. "I could just play guitar. I brought my pedals, and [Leiweke] has a million amps and guitars, so we had a really good time. For me, it's more about the pedals than it is the guitar." Daugherty also leaned on Leiweke for all the acoustic guitar work on the album, which Hindalong claimed was better for his percussive contributions. "Derri's a great acoustic player, but because we tracked a lot of [the songs] in Nashville, I like to play drums and get a good acoustic thing going." Dan Michaels also performed more baritone sax on this album, since he had purchased a new one to play on Daugherty's solo album The Color of Dreams prior to the recording of Bloodshot.

== Composition ==
=== Music ===
Both Daugherty and Hindalong were listening to Morning Phase by Beck at this time, and the "ambient" use of strings on that album inspired the Choir to do the same thing on Bloodshot, which would prominently feature strings on a handful of tracks. The strings were orchestrated by long-time collaborator Matt Slocum of Sixpence None the Richer, and featured David Davidson on violin, a session musician who had played on albums for artists as diverse as Leonard Cohen, Dolly Parton and Chicago. Regarding Davidson's contributions, Hindalong said that "one of the things about living in Nashville is that you get to reach out to some of the best players in the world."

In addition to Beck, a number of other artists influenced the musical development of several tracks on Bloodshot. According to Hindalong, "Summer Rain" was inspired by the Alarm's song "Rain in the Summertime," while Daugherty said that the "melancholy epicness" of "Birds, Bewildered" reminded him of Manic Street Preachers' "If You Tolerate This Your Children Will Be Next." Michaels' sax line on "Only Reasons" was a nod to "Strangest Thing" by The War on Drugs, while Slocum's string arrangement for "Birds, Bewildered" was inspired by early Elton John records, which was then performed entirely by Michaels on his Lyricon. "Magic" directly referenced the Will Ferrell movie Elf in both the music and lyrics, as Hindalong designed the drum fill to be a "sound effect" that captured the snowball scene in the film.

Like the Choir's prior album Shadow Weaver, PledgeMusic backers were able to pay for an opportunity to play on the album. In one instance, an entire family came out to support their daughter's performance on the track "We've Got the Moon," then watched a solar eclipse together with the band. These types of intimately personal guest contributions would become a regular feature of crowdfunded Choir albums, prompting Michaels to say that "it's a testament to mutual trust with our fans that we can bring them this closely into our process. They're our friends, our listeners, and over the years—over decades—we get to know them, and their children as well." Most of these musical performances were recorded in Nashville, but the cowbell heard on "Californians on Ice" was performed at Neverland, and was the final piece recorded for the album.

=== Lyrics ===
While the lyrics that referenced Hindalong's divorce gained the most attention from critics, the topic is only addressed directly in three songs, "House of Blues," "Only Reasons" and "Birds, Bewildered." Hindalong pointed out that "a lot of the songs people see through that lens. A lot of them aren't about [divorce], that people seem to think are." In fact, more songs on the album ("Summer Rain," "Magic," "We've Got the Moon," "Because You're Beautiful") were inspired by a new relationship Hindalong had begun before the recording of this album.

Even so, "House of Blues" was the first song written for Bloodshot. Initially, it was inspired by a promotional idea that Michaels had about a scheduled gig at the House of Blues in San Diego on the Wide-Eyed Wonder anniversary tour in 2017. Michaels promised that the band would write a song called "House of Blues" if enough people showed up for the concert. Since Hindalong had already begun work on the song, the Choir simply followed through with completing it for this album. "I wrote the lyric in the van on that tour, and it's unusual for me to write an entire lyric without music," Hindalong said. "It went where it went, and it was a heavy topic for me. I was very uncomfortable with it, actually, and really wrestled with whether to allow it on the album. I couldn't even be in the room when Derri sang it. It's hard for me to hear, quite honestly." "Birds, Bewildered" also addressed the same "hard topic" once Hindalong heard the music that Daugherty had composed. "I knew that it was very special to Derri," Hindalong said, so he felt that he "would have to go deep with the lyric."

To lighten the tone of the album, Hindalong wrote "Californians on Ice," which poked fun at the band members' inability to adapt to the cold Tennessee winters when they first moved to Nashville in 1993. The song specifically references an incident where the Choir's road manager slipped and fell on the ice. "I don't know why we laugh when somebody falls," Hindalong said. "I always say that if you can laugh, you may as well."

"The odds [against] us still playing [together] these days are astronomical. I think it's just our work ethic and perseverance, and the fact that—early on—our sound, our performance and [Steve's] words made an indelible mark on people, and it's kind of lasted the test of time."

— Dan Michaels in 2018, regarding Bloodshot

Other tracks addressed the Choir in general, and late bassist Chandler in particular. "Dizzy Wounded" "is about the band," Hindalong said. "Life's always challenging, and sometimes the temptation is to be despairing. Before we surrender to sadness, let's 'dizzy wounded dance.' There's still a lot of hope. Being merciful to one another is the key to survival [and] longevity. That's why most bands don't last for more than three years. They don't have mercy on each other." "The Way You Always Are" references many of the humorous arguments that Hindalong and Chandler had over the years, particularly in regards to Chandler's fondness for Steely Dan. "He did love that Aja record," Daugherty recalled. "He played it all the time; it drove me crazy."

The album's closer, "The Time Has Come," was the last song written for Bloodshot, and addresses the topic of forgiveness. Hindalong's observations of blue herons at Radnor Lake in Oak Hill, Tennessee were referenced in the lyrics to provide a visual image of the song's theme. Daugherty claimed that the song "sums up everything about the band," and "generates a powerful reaction when played live." Hindalong added that, "I can't rewind the clock; I don't get a do-over, and I have trouble forgiving myself for some things. We can't go back, but every day, we get a new chance."

== Release ==
Bloodshot was released digitally and on CD in June 2018. A digital download of band commentary on every track from Daugherty, Hindalong and Michaels was also issued to PledgeMusic supporters.

The following year, the Choir mounted a separate Kickstarter campaign to release Bloodshot on vinyl. The campaign was successful, and the single-disc red vinyl version was released in June 2019.

Bloodshot was also released for digital download on iTunes and is now widely available on various music streaming platforms.

== Tour ==
The Choir did not mount an official tour for Bloodshot. Instead, the band opted to perform tracks from this album at the occasional music festival and in their set as the opening act for the Prayer Chain's brief tour, which promoted the 25th anniversary re-release of their debut album Shawl, produced by Hindalong.

== Critical reception ==
Professional ratings
Review scores
Source	Rating
Jesus Freak Hideout	4.5/5 stars
Jesus Freak Hideout	5/5 stars
The Fire Note	4/5 stars
Down the Line	Favorable
Cephas Hour	Favorable
US Rocker	Favorable

Critical reviews for Bloodshot were positive, although the downbeat nature of some of the lyrics was consistently noted. Alex Caldwell, in the first of two reviews from Jesus Freak Hideout, said, "you aren't likely to hear a heartbreaking subject like divorce treated with this level of transparency from a standpoint of faith in many places. Bloodshot is a heartbreaking and moving listen, with a veteran band's level of attention to detail." John Underdown, in the even higher-rated second review, agreed: "the songs grow on the listener with each spin and the depth of the writing is compelling with great use of imagery." Dan MacIntosh, writing for US Rocker, observed that while the Choir "has never shied away from facing deeply emotional wounds head-on," Bloodshot "may be the first time most of a Choir album can best be described as truly heartbreaking." He pointed out that the album's "recurring sadness would be unbearable in lesser artistic hands," concluding that "Bloodshot is just one more chapter in [the band's] growing tome of unquestionable sincerity."

Other critics opted to highlight the upbeat nature of the music on Bloodshot. Brian Q. Newcomb from The Fire Note pointed out that "the music here is more high energy and positive sounding than you would expect with this content." Matt Crosslin, writing for Down the Line, concurred, saying that Bloodshot is "their most consistent and listenable album since their 80s/90s heyday." Jerry Wilson from Cephas Hour summed up Bloodshot as "the most straightforward album The Choir has ever recorded," calling the songs "simpler without being simplistic: more direct, more immediately accessible.”

=== Accolades ===
- UTR Media
  - Best of 2018 (included in list)

== Track listing ==
All lyrics by Steve Hindalong. All music by Derri Daugherty, except where noted.

Standard edition (CD)
No.	Title	Music	Length
1.	"Bloodshot Eyes"		4:42
2.	"Californians on Ice"		3:16
3.	"Summer Rain"		3:58
4.	"Birds, Bewildered"		4:55
5.	"Only Reasons"		4:13
6.	"House of Blues"	Steve Hindalong	3:15
7.	"The Dizzy Wounded"	Hindalong, Tim Chandler, Stephen Leiweke	4:32
8.	"Because You're Beautiful (Bloodshot Reprise)"		1:13
9.	"The Way You Always Are"	Hindalong, Chandler	4:35
10.	"Magic"		3:30
11.	"We've Got the Moon"	Hindalong	3:13
12.	"The Time Has Come"		5:14
Total length:			46:36

Vinyl edition (Side one)
No.	Title	Music	Length
1.	"Bloodshot Eyes"		4:42
2.	"Californians on Ice"		3:16
3.	"Summer Rain"		3:58
4.	"Birds, Bewildered"		4:55
5.	"Only Reasons"		4:13
6.	"House of Blues"	Hindalong	3:15

Vinyl edition (Side two)
No.	Title	Music	Length
1.	"The Dizzy Wounded"	Hindalong, Chandler, Leiweke	4:32
2.	"Because You're Beautiful (Bloodshot Reprise)"		1:13
3.	"The Way You Always Are"	Hindalong, Chandler	4:35
4.	"Magic"		3:30
5.	"We've Got the Moon"	Hindalong	3:13
6.	"The Time Has Come"		5:14
Total length:			46:36

Band Commentary (Digital download)
No.	Title	Length
1.	"Choir Commentary: Bloodshot"	48:16
Total length:		48:16

== Personnel ==
Personnel taken from Bloodshot liner notes.

The Choir

- Derri Daugherty - Lead vocals, electric guitar
- Steve Hindalong - Drums, percussion, vocals, lead vocals ("The Way You Always Are")
- Tim Chandler - Bass guitar
- Dan Michaels - Saxophone, lyricon

Guest performers

- Stephen Leiweke - Acoustic guitar, electric guitar, keyboards
- Matt Slocum - cello and string arrangements
- David Davidson - violin
- Steve Mason - vocals
- Mason Zgoda - vocals ("Bloodshot Eyes")
- Jeff Alkire - Arco bass ("The Dizzy Wounded")
- Jason Ames - Cowbell ("Californians On Ice")
- Brad Behrens - Electric guitar ("Birds, Bewildered")
- Dith Yoder - Electric guitar ("The Way You Always Are")
- Jim Schreck - Electric guitar, loops (ambient loop) ("Because You're Beautiful")
- Cate Yoder - Piano ("The Time Has Come")
- Matt Strange - Piano ("Magic")
- Kayla Anderson - Ukulele, vocals ("We've Got the Moon")

Production

- Stephen Leiweke - producer
- Jason Ames - executive producer
- Dan Michaels - executive producer
- Lisa Michaels - executive producer, handler
- Shane Wilson - mixer
- Recorded by Stephen Leiweke, Derri Daugherty
