= Deep Cuts (The Choir album) =

Studio album by The Choir
- Released: April 2, 2021
- Recorded: 2020
- Studios: Spooky's Lair, Brentwood, Tennessee; Yackland, Nashville, Tennessee
- Genres: Alternative rock; indie rock
- Length: 57:46
- Label: Galaxy21
- Producers: Derri Daugherty; Steve Hindalong; Stephen Leiweke

The Choir chronology
Kissers and Killers - The Acoustic Sessions (2018)	Deep Cuts (2021)	Words Spoken and Floating on Clouds (2023)

The Choir studio albums chronology
Bloodshot (2018)	Deep Cuts (2021)	Translucent (2024)

Deep Cuts is the 19th studio release, and 17th full-length studio album, by alternative rock band the Choir, released in 2021. This is the band’s first double album, and the Choir's first studio album to be recorded after the death of long-time bass guitarist Tim Chandler, who died in 2018.

== Background ==
In 2019, the Choir began releasing digital singles on multiple streaming platforms at the pace of one every other month. This began with an ambient cover of Phil Collins' "In the Air Tonight," then followed by "Mystical World," the Choir’s first original composition with the remaining threesome of lead singer and guitarist Derri Daugherty, drummer and lyricist Steve Hindalong and saxophone and Lyricon player Dan Michaels. Stephen Mason, known primarily for his work with Jars of Clay, stepped in as bass guitarist on that track—which would later be remixed and included on Deep Cuts—as well as on "Eyes on Fire," which was also originally recorded at that time. According to Michaels, "I realized that we want to stay active, and it's hard to stay active with creative content if you’re just doing a record every two to three years. I thought that would […] allow us to be consistent with coming up with material throughout the year, and then we could repurpose those songs later on." The final digital single to be made widely available, "The Real WWW," was released in honor of Chandler's passing, as it was the last Choir recording to feature his musical contributions. In February 2020, the band announced a single Kickstarter campaign for Deep Cuts that included a vinyl option, unlike the two separate crowdfunding efforts for the Choir's previous album Bloodshot.

Both the initial plans for, and subsequent recording of, Deep Cuts were upended by a number of challenges. "Pandemic, civil unrest, Derri's in the hospital," Michaels said. "We had to cancel our touring for the entire year. We were all set for March and April to do the Deep Cuts tour. It wasn't going to be necessarily about this album; it was going to be us going out and playing songs that we don’t normally play, the 'deeper cuts' on our albums." According to Hindalong, this would have been a "double hook" that the Choir planned on implementing as a marketing tool. "When Derri gave me the music for this song, 'Deep Cuts' had another meaning. Let's go out on the tour, do the 'deep cuts' tour, and then have an album with the same title with another meaning to it." The March 2020 lockdown of the United States due to the worldwide COVID-19 pandemic put an immediate end to those tour plans, so the band focused their efforts solely on the new album.

== Recording and production ==
Deep Cuts was partially recorded at the Choir's new studio, which was now relocated to Michaels' home and dubbed "Spooky's Lair" by Daugherty, after one of the two American Eskimo dogs owned by Michaels and his wife, Lisa. The remainder of the album—most notably, the drums and guitars—were recorded at co-producer Steven Leiweke’s studio.

Leiweke, who produced Bloodshot, also played all acoustic guitars on Deep Cuts for the second album in a row. As a part of the "Greenville College group" that included Jars of Clay and Paper Route, Leiweke also brought with him two singer-songwriter friends to contribute background vocals: Jonathan Noël and Mason Zgoda. Session musician Chris Donohue, a frequent collaborator with Phil Madeira and whom Hindalong described as "the best bass player we know," served as Chandler's replacement for the majority of the album, and in some cases, attempted to mimic his style.

Finally, Prayer Chain guitarist Andy Prickett performed electric guitar solos on four tracks. As a long-time friend of the band—since Hindalong produced most of the Prayer Chain’s albums—the Choir had pestered Prickett to record with them for years. "We asked him to play on the last record, but he said that he quit music," Hindalong said. "I can't believe I nailed him down. He's like trying to get a goldfish out of a bowl. But he did it, and he did great." Prickett, who is based in California, happened to be visiting his daughter in Nashville at the time the Choir needed him, so he was able to provide all his contributions in a single day of recording.

== Composition ==
=== Music ===
For Deep Cuts, the Choir experimented with a different mix of instruments and sounds. Hindalong utilized new types of percussion, so a glockenspiel and hand claps were featured on different tracks, along with an ambient use of harmonica. According to Hindalong, Deep Cuts featured more of Michaels' saxophone and Lyricon contributions than any other Choir album, and Michaels claimed he "channeled his inner Psychedelic Furs" for this record. In addition, he hired an outside composer for the first time to help him write his sax part for the song "Trouble," as that song was already completed by the time horns were to be added.

"Trouble" itself was an unusual song for the Choir, as it was originally conceived as a demo track to pitch to the TV series Yellowstone, and written from the perspective of the Beth Dutton character, portrayed by Kelly Reilly. "This song is a strange one for us. It's kind of out of character a little bit," Daugherty said. Hindalong agreed, adding, "we can't put that on a Choir record. It doesn't fit the vibe. Everything about it felt different, and the lyric was not personal. But I ended up writing the whole thing, and everybody liked it, and it ended up on the album."

A number of tracks on Deep Cuts also were musically reworked or rebuilt from scratch. "Kindred Spirits" originally had a "Tom Petty vibe," but the rest of the band was dissatisfied with the results, so Hindalong kept revising the lyrics and Daugherty came up with a different melody. "Sunshine Girl" was written as a slow ballad, but Daugherty recommended that the tempo be increased significantly; when it was, he was satisfied that it "sounded like a Choir song." By contrast, "The Fool" was written at a much faster pace, but was later slowed down considerably for the final version. Daugherty originally had a "really pitchy My Bloody Valentine guitar" solo on "Deep Cuts," but Hindalong and Leiweke "ganged up on him," so Daugherty was forced to come up with a new solo for that track. Even "Mystical World," which was previously recorded, was remixed by Leiweke from drummer perspective, where the sound of the drums are imaged from the perspective of the drummer facing the audience, as opposed to what the audience would hear facing the band. He also mixed "Trouble" to feature the horns "off in the back corner" as one would normally hear them live, versus "spread out," as can be the case with a studio recording.

Similar to the use of Hindalong’s motorcycle and his daughter Emily's giggle on Circle Slide, the Choir layered in sound effects on Deep Cuts that also had a personal connection to the band. In addition to the barking of Michaels' dogs Spooky and Hotcake at the end of "Reckless Ways," the playful laughter of Erica Estes was included at the end of "Feel You Close" as a way to honor her short life. The daughter of a close friend of the band, she "passed away suddenly and unexpectedly at the age of 20. I can’t imagine anything hurting more than that," Hindalong said.

As with the prior two Choir studio albums, crowdfunding supporters could pay to perform on Deep Cuts. Three of them contributed musically, while another provided a spoken count off to the title track.

=== Lyrics ===
Because the Choir’s Kickstarter campaign included a double-disc vinyl option from the very beginning, Deep Cuts "was organized in fours," with the first three sides featuring a sequence of tracks that were thematically connected, leaving the fourth side to be filled out with previously issued digital singles.

Side One primarily featured songs that were "very collective" observations about the current state of the world. While written in advance of the COVID-19 pandemic and the destructive 2020 hurricane season, the opening track "Hurricane" addressed "a whole lot of political commotion going on, as there still is—a lot of things we don't have control over," Hindalong said. "The one thing we can have a profound effect on is our interpersonal relationships, and the people who are closest to us." "The Woods" dealt with the isolation caused by the lockdown phase of the pandemic, when Hindalong had to walk alone in the woods near his Nashville home. Eventually, he would "walk in the woods with a friend," as he and fellow musician Madeira began to hike together several times each week. "Kindred Spirits" was inspired by a conversation Hindalong had with a former Black Hawk helicopter pilot who served in Afghanistan. "I just revere these guys when I hear their stories. It doesn't matter what side you're on; they're just there to save people." This sentiment expanded more broadly in the final lyrics: "People want you to pick a side right now. And I try really hard with my social media not to [drive] wedges. Look, I've traveled this whole country—blue states, red states—and I love people everywhere. I don't agree with everybody; we all have our different opinions, but we didn't used to know what side you were, whether you were left or right, because we didn't have social media and Facebook.”

"We like to hide. And this goes way farther than Christian music or Christianity. As a human being, we're conditioned to think that our scars are worse than everyone else's scars, so if they see our scars, they're going to go, 'Oh, my God.'"

— Derri Daugherty in 2021, regarding the title track "Deep Cuts"

The tracks collected on Side Two mostly addressed "personal failure and struggles." Ironically, the first track, "Aces Over Eights," was conceived as something entirely different. Originally, the track was called "Undaunted Love," and addressed Hindalong's relationship with his youngest daughter. The song was recorded and completed, but the rest of the band felt the result was overly sentimental, and they asked him to rewrite the lyrics, something he claimed he almost never does. Hindalong "tried to make it as dark and create as much tension as I could" by directly referencing the loss of bassist Chandler within a rumination about mortality and death, topics that the following track, "Reckless Ways" also addressed. "The Fool" went even darker. "This song doesn't really have any answers," Hindalong admitted. "There's no hope in it. Sometimes I think a song doesn't have to have a solution in it. This is sometimes how we feel. I was talking to myself; not anybody else. Sometimes we find ourselves in a situation […] where as a consequence of your behavior—the mess you got yourself in—you just really are in a place of despair and shame [and] are really defeated.”

"We want to extend mercy to other people, because we want others to extend mercy to us. I want people to see my goodness, despite all the mistakes I've made."

— Steve Hindalong in 2021, also referencing the title track

Side Three lightens the tone with primarily romantic songs. While one critic took issue with Hindalong and Daugherty writing such material at their age, they defended themselves by joking that "we're not dead yet," claiming that Leonard Cohen wrote similar material up until his death at the age of 82. Deep Cuts then concludes with the title track, which originated with a basic musical cue from Daugherty that he sent to Hindalong on his phone. "I walked up and down the street, up and down the street, listening to it over and over," Hindalong recalled. "It was emotionally moving to me, right from the start. But it seemed like [the song] took quite a while to really evolve." This was because Hindalong's lyrics are often specific to just one person or situation. "This is not," he emphasized. "I was thinking of several people. People have such a bad self-view; they lack self-love. I think that's the most important thing about spirituality, is to realize divine love. That would be my hope and prayer for people. I just wanted to offer something really hopeful."

== Artwork and packaging ==
The idea of using kintsugi as a visual theme for Deep Cuts came from Hindalong's girlfriend, as he was previously unfamiliar with this Japanese practice. The idea of embracing and even highlighting one's brokenness, as addressed in the album's title track, resonated with Hindalong, and the kintsugi plate would eventually become the primary imagery for the album. The gold cover design was then extended to gold-colored vinyl for the double-disc LP.

== Release ==
In March 2021, after the recording of Deep Cuts was completed, the Choir announced a new Patreon effort, where the band would reward supporters with one new song per month, along with behind-the-scenes content. "I'm still amazed how fans will go onto our Facebook page and ask questions about a lyric from 20 years ago," Michaels said. "So, there's a hunger to get some more insight with the band, and I figured that we can do that with a Patreon."

Deep Cuts was released one month later in April 2021 digitally, on CD and double-disc vinyl. The vinyl version includes five of the digital singles that were previously distributed in 2019 and 2020. Deep Cuts was also released for digital download on iTunes, and is now widely available on various music streaming platforms.

A digital download of band commentary on every track from Daugherty, Hindalong and Michaels was also issued to Kickstarter supporters.

=== Words Spoken and Floating on Clouds ===
One of the Kickstarter campaign’s stretch goals was a spoken word release, on which Hindalong would recite lyrics of ten Choir songs from the band's past repertoire over newly-recorded ambient music beds. Although the band did not reach the $50,000 level necessary to trigger that particular stretch goal before the campaign ended, the Choir opted to finish the album anyway, releasing it digitally to Kickstarter supporters in March 2023. Entitled Words Spoken and Floating on Clouds, the album was subsequently made available to purchase as a digital download by non-Kickstarter supporters.

The instrumental tracks (sans vocals) were later remixed and released as a new studio album in November 2024 entitled Translucent. This version was initially released on vinyl and CD only, but later made available on streaming services in January 2025.

== Critical reception ==
Professional ratings
Review scores
Source	Rating
CCM Magazine	3/5 stars
World	Mixed
True Tunes	Favorable
Jesus Freak Hideout	4/5 stars
The Fire Note	4.5/5 stars
Cephas Hour	Favorable
The Heartland Attack	3/5 stars

Critical reviews for Deep Cuts were mostly favorable, and focused primarily on the upbeat nature of the album compared to its immediate predecessor. Dan McIntosh from CCM Magazine called the album "a positive emotional space," saying that the Choir has been "a good friend to many of us, and we’re so thankful it continues to keep this musical conversation going." John Underdown at Jesus Freak Hideout also thought that Deep Cuts featured "a newer, brighter message [...] focused on pushing for better times and reconciliation." However, he saw this as a weakness compared to the band's previous work: "Deep Cuts is more laid back and simply exists because these guys love making music together. That's fine, but it feels like a middle-of-the-road Choir album." Levi Yager from The Heartland Attack agreed, saying that "while Deep Cuts may not be The Choir’s best work, it’s certainly no failure." Arsenio Orteza, writing for World, was more ambivalent. He praised the band for "setting terse, faith-based wisdom to the echoey, chiming hooks for which they’ve become beloved," naming "Aces Over Eights" as a particular high point, but compared the Choir's romantic songs unfavorably to America, saying that the latter band was "better than Daugherty and Hindalong at making […] love songs open-ended enough for outsiders to imagine them as their own."

Andre Salles from True Tunes was more favorable, emphasizing that the album's kintsugi cover art was representative of its more complex emotional theme: "about how love makes us whole, but also about how the scars we carry from our pain make us even more beautiful. It is the love songs that give this album its character." The strongest review came from Brian Q. Newcomb at The Fire Note, calling Deep Cuts "an altogether more up-tempo effort that rocks with intentionality and purpose," and saying that the song "'The Woods,' with an aggressive guitar attack and a gripping sax solo, is a welcome return to an intensity reminiscent of the band’s great, underrated ’93 release, Kissers and Killers.”

=== Accolades ===
- Jesus Freak Hideout
  - 2021 Staff Picks (included in list)

== Track listing ==
All tracks written by Derri Daugherty and Steve Hindalong except where noted.

Standard edition (CD)
No.	Title	Length
1.	"Hurricane"	6:15
2.	"The Woods"	4:35
3.	"Kindred Spirits"	4:45
4.	"Feel You Close"	4:39
5.	"Aces Over Eights"	4:40
6.	"Reckless Ways"	5:27
7.	"Trouble"	4:18
8.	"The Fool"	4:23
9.	"Sunshine Girl"	5:13
10.	"Eyes on Fire"	4:16
11.	"Mystical World"	3:54
12.	"Deep Cuts"	5:21
Total length:		57:46

Vinyl edition (Side one)
No.	Title	Length
1.	"Hurricane"	6:15
2.	"The Woods"	4:35
3.	"Kindred Spirits"	4:45
4.	"Feel You Close"	4:39

Vinyl edition (Side two)
No.	Title	Length
1.	"Aces Over Eights"	4:40
2.	"Reckless Ways"	5:27
3.	"Trouble"	4:18
4.	"The Fool"	4:23

Vinyl edition (Side three)
No.	Title	Length
1.	"Sunshine Girl"	5:13
2.	"Eyes on Fire"	4:16
3.	"Mystical World"	3:54
4.	"Deep Cuts"	5:21

Vinyl edition (Side four) — The B-Sides
No.	Title	Writer(s)	Length
1.	"Kathie's Garden"	Richard Reeves, Steve Hindalong	3:10
2.	"The Real WWW"	Hindalong, Tim Chandler	3:43
3.	"Counting Stars"	Ryan Tedder	4:30
4.	"What You Think I Am" (featuring Leigh Nash)	Derri Daugherty, Marc Byrd, Hindalong	4:32
5.	"After All (Re-imagined)"		4:59
Total length:			78:40

Band Commentary (Digital download)
No.	Title	Length
1.	"Choir Commentary: Deep Cuts"	60:16
Total length:		60:16

Crowdfunded bonus studio album (Digital download) - Words Spoken and Floating on Clouds
No.	Title	Length
1.	"Circle Slide"	4:05
2.	"Sled Dog"	3:29
3.	"Cross That River"	4:57
4.	"Everybody’s Got a Guru"	5:25
5.	"Fine Fun Time"	4:20
6.	"Flap Your Wings"	3:52
7.	"Mr. Chandler"	3:50
8.	"Sad Face"	3:47
9.	"What You Think I Am"	4:00
10.	"The Time Has Come"	6:03
Total length:		43:48

== Personnel ==
Personnel taken from Deep Cuts liner notes.

The Choir

- Derri Daugherty – lead vocals, electric guitar, acoustic guitar, keyboards
- Steve Hindalong – drums, percussion, harmonica, glockenspiel, gong, vocals, lead vocals on "Kathie's Garden" and "The Real WWW"
- Dan Michaels – saxophone, Lyricon, horn samples

Guest performers

- Chris Donohue – bass guitar
- Stephen Leiweke – acoustic guitar
- Jonathan Noël – vocals
- Mason Zgoda – vocals
- Stephen Mason – vocals, bass ("Eyes on Fire," "Mystical World," "Kathie's Garden," "Counting Stars")
- Andy Prickett – electric guitar ("Hurricane," "Feel You Close," "Aces Over Eights," "Deep Cuts")
- Tim Chandler – bass ("The Real WWW", "What You Think I Am"), electric guitar ("The Real WWW")
- Marc Byrd – electric guitar ("What You Think I Am")
- Leigh Nash – vocals ("What You Think I Am," "After All (Re-imagined)")
- Matt Slocum – cello ("After All (Re-imagined)")
- Michael Walker – electric guitar ("Kindred Spirits," "Sunshine Girl")
- Jared Norris – keyboards ("The Fool," "Deep Cuts")
- Mark Uecker – twelve-string guitar ("Sunshine Girl")
- John Steingard – programming ("After All (Re-imagined)")
- Spooky – dog vocals ("Reckless Ways")
- Hotcake – dog vocals ("Reckless Ways")
- Erica Estes – voice [Angelic Laughter On Outro] ("Feel You Close")
- Christopher Heyn – voice ["You Are Beautiful, Hit It"] ("Deep Cuts")

Production

- Derri Daugherty – producer, engineer
- Steve Hindalong – producer
- Stephen Leiweke – producer, engineer, mixing
- Dan Michaels – executive producer
- Lisa Michaels – executive producer, handler
- Mark Uecker – executive producer
- Kimberly Uecker – executive producer
- Nigel Palmer – mastering
- Todd Evans – cover art, design
