= Translucent (album) =

Studio album by The Choir
- Released: November 21, 2024
- Recorded: 2021–2024
- Studios: Spooky's Lair, Brentwood, Tennessee
- Genres: Ambient music; Post-rock
- Length: 43:08
- Label: Galaxy21
- Producers: Dan Michaels; Lisa Michaels

The Choir chronology
Patreon Sessions (Unfinished Tracks) (2024)	Translucent (2024)	Dragonfly (2026)

The Choir studio albums chronology
Deep Cuts (2021)	Translucent (2024)	Dragonfly (2026)

Translucent is the 24th studio release, and 21st full-length studio album, by alternative rock band the Choir, released in 2024. This is the band’s first instrumental release.

== Background ==
The origins of Translucent began when lead vocalist and guitarist Derri Daugherty experimented with adding ambient textures to the first iteration of what would become the song "Kindred Spirits" on Deep Cuts, released in 2021. However, the Choir had long incorporated ambient textures into its music as far back at 1988's Chase the Kangaroo. Drummer and lyricist Steve Hindalong said that, "Derri was a big fan of Brian Eno, and I remember that album Music for Films, and Music for Airports, that Eno did back in the late seventies. For a lot of our songs, Derri was incorporating that floaty, ambient, beautiful sonic soundscape decades ago. It's kind of an amazing wonder to me that we didn't do [an ambient release] sooner.”

== Recording and production ==
After hearing Daugherty's musical experimentations during the recording of Deep Cuts, saxophone and Lyricon player Dan Michaels asked, "Can this vibe be made into a record? Let's work on other tracks and see where this goes." The band had an idea to create a spoken word album of ten songs from the Choir's past repertoire, so additional ambient tracks were created for this effort. Hindalong would recite the lyrics, then Daugherty responded by creating ambient sounds based on the key and/or chord progression of the original song. Even though this effort was initially digitally released to Kickstarter supporters as Words Spoken and Floating on Clouds in 2023, the instrumental tracks were still evolving. According to Daugherty, it was Michaels that kept coming back and encouraging the band to complete the project. Ironically, while Michaels' saxophone and Lyricon had long been a vital part of the Choir's musical identity, those were some of the last instruments to be recorded for the album, which required Michaels to carefully weave his contributions around existing material. Hindalong then finalized the recording with additional sounds, including bells from India that he braided together, and Roland HandSonic drum machine noises. The album was then mastered by Nigel Palmer, who had just completed work remastering the 2024 reissue of Free Flying Soul.

== Artwork and packaging ==
Hindalong asked Love Coma lead vocalist and visual artist Chris Taylor to paint a winter forest scene. Upon delivery, Hindalong described the final effort as "translucent." After bringing the painting to the studio to show Daugherty and Michaels, Hindalong agreed that Taylor's work should be the cover art and that the descriptive term be the name of the album.

== Release ==
Translucent was released in November 2024, initially only on vinyl and CD, with no advance notice or promotion. Unlike all the Choir's studio albums and re-releases since 2013, Translucent was not the result of a crowdfunding campaign, and that was a deliberate choice on the part of the band. "I didn't think it would be successful at all," Hindalong said. Instead, he viewed the effort as simply a "legacy piece." He and the band were later taken aback by the high initial sales volume after their Facebook announcement.

Translucent was later released for digital download on Bandcamp in January 2025, and is now widely available on various music streaming platforms.

The track "You Don’t Have to Smile" was featured as the lead song on the April 8, 2025, episode of All Songs Considered on NPR.

== Critical reception ==
Professional ratings
Review scores
Source	Rating
The Big Takeover	Favorable
PopMatters	Favorable
The Relay Station	Favorable
Insights Magazine	Favorable

Translucent was well-received upon release. Writing for The Big Takeover, Jeff Elbel described Translucent as "replete with beautiful droning sounds that float into space." He added that the album gave nods "to sonic trailblazers Daniel Lanois, Brian Eno and Robin Guthrie," but was more in line with post-rock band Hammock. Elbel concluded by saying, "find whoever's making a new Blade Runner project and offer the Vangelis-y 'Plastic Swords' for the film's opening crawl." Nick Mattiske, writing for the Uniting Church in Australia's Insights Magazine, also agreed about Hammock's influence. "Translucent has a similar sound to [Hammock’s] Nevertheless, with perhaps instruments more perceptible, with synth washes and echoing guitars, often a bit more guitar-driven, to the extent of utilising the potential of slow feedback." He added that "'Slippery Moss' has some Edge-like, ringing guitar notes, drenched in reverb. 'The Bravest Mind' sounds like the introduction to 'Where the Streets Have No Name' extended for five minutes. There's perhaps a darker tint than Hammock; perhaps the rock'n'roll is only just beginning to slough off." Translucent was a featured album on the April 16, 2025, episode of The Relay Station podcast, and host Michael Tangen described the album as an "expressive work of art," adding that it features "deeply contemplative and reflective spaces, and moments ornately adorned with restrained optimism and hope."

In PopMatters' 2025 retrospective of the Top 15 ambient albums of that year, writer Evan Sawdey ranked Translucent as #2. He acknowledged most readers' unfamiliarity with 1980s contemporary Christian music in general and the Choir in particular, but pointed out that even though this was the band's first instrumental album, Translucent is "staggeringly well composed." He added that the band "never sounds unsure of their approach," highlighting that "their chemistry and history with saxophonist Dan Michaels remain unparalleled." Sawdey concluded by saying that "the group hasn’t given just 'an' ambient album, but instead one of the year's best."

=== Accolades ===
- PopMatters
  - Top 15 Ambient Albums of 2025 (#2)

== Track listing ==
All tracks written by Derri Daugherty, Steve Hindalong and Dan Michaels.

Side one
No.	Title	Length
1.	"Fire in the Heavens"	4:06
2.	"You Don’t Have to Smile"	3:47
3.	"Slippery Moss"	4:59
4.	"The Bravest Mind"	5:24
5.	"Cool Black Water"	3:51

Side two
No.	Title	Length
1.	"Take to the Sky"	3:51
2.	"Plastic Swords"	4:20
3.	"Chariot Race"	3:29
4.	"Nobody’s Angel"	4:01
5.	"Watching Feathers Float"	6:06
Total length:		43:08

== Personnel ==
Personnel taken from Translucent liner notes.

The Choir

- Derri Daugherty – guitar, keyboards
- Steve Hindalong – digital hand percussion, bells of India
- Dan Michaels – Lyricon, tenor saxophone

Production

- Dan Michaels – executive producer
- Lisa Michaels – executive producer
- Derri Daugherty – recording, mixing
- Nigel Palmer – mastering [Lowland Masters]
- Chris Taylor – cover painting, photography [back cover]
- Marc Ludena – design [package], layout
