= Flap Your Wings =

Flap Your Wings may refer to:

- "Flap Your Wings" (song), a 2004 song by Nelly
- Flap Your Wings (album), a 2000 album by The Choir
