= Shadow Weaver (The Choir album) =

Studio album by The Choir
- Released: April 9, 2014
- Recorded: 2014
- Studios: Attic of Misfittt Toys, Franklin, Tennessee; Spencer Creek Studios, Franklin, Tennessee; Breathturn, Franklin, Tennessee
- Genres: Alternative rock; indie rock
- Length: 56:20
- Label: Galaxy21
- Producers: Derri Daugherty; Steve Hindalong; Marc Byrd

The Choir chronology
Peace, Love & Light (2013)	Shadow Weaver (2014)	Live and On the Wing in Music City (2014)

The Choir studio albums chronology
Peace, Love & Light (2013)	Shadow Weaver (2014)	Bloodshot (2018)

Shadow Weaver is the 16th studio release, and 14th full-length studio album, by alternative rock band the Choir, released in 2014. This was the last album to feature Marc Byrd as a member of the band, and the first time the Choir used crowdfunding to finance a new studio project. In 2019, UTR Media named Shadow Weaver as one of the "30 Best Gourmet Albums of the Decade (2010-2019)."

== Background ==
In the two years following the release of The Loudest Sound Ever Heard, the members of the Choir pursued other musical endeavors, sometimes together. Lead singer and guitarist Derri Daugherty and drummer and lyricist Steve Hindalong contributed audio engineering and percussion, respectively, to a number of projects during this time. The most notable was Dig Here Said the Angel by veteran Christian alternative rock band Daniel Amos, which was the band's first studio release in twelve years. For Daugherty, this was a reunion of sorts, as he was a former roadie and studio hand for Daniel Amos back in the 1980s, and engineered Daniel Amos' 1983 release Doppelgänger prior to forming Youth Choir with Hindalong. Choir bassist Tim Chandler was the long-time bassist for Daniel Amos as well, and also played on this record.

Daugherty, Hindalong and Chandler also contributed similar efforts to the 2013 album Job by singer/songwriter Rick Elias, which proved to be his final release before his death in 2019. Daugherty then co-produced the self-titled debut album from Vekora in 2013, featuring Jesse Sprinkle from Poor Old Lu. Choir guitarist Marc Byrd continued to be heavily involved with his critically-acclaimed post-rock band Hammock, first with the band's double album Departure Songs in 2012, followed by Oblivion Hymns in 2013.

Since saxophone and Lyricon player Dan Michaels had become a successful A&R man in the Christian music industry, particularly with the band MercyMe while a senior vice president at Fair Trade Services, he had financed the Choir's past three studio albums—Burning Like the Midnight Sun, de-plumed, The Loudest Sound Ever Heard—and also served as the band's manager. However, the Choir opted to use Kickstarter to crowdfund this release, as both Dig Here Said the Angel and Job were funded and released this way. The Choir would then rely on crowdfunding for all future studio releases.

== Recording and production ==
The Choir's successful 2013 Kickstarter campaign for Shadow Weaver proved to be instrumental in giving the band more time to record and mix the album, creating "a more complete sonic palette," according to Byrd. "The thing about this band is that none of us are session guys," Daugherty added. "We're not the guys that can go in and nail something in one take and be out of there in a half an hour. We struggle with it all the time." This was of particular help to Michaels, who would receive rough mixes and some of the demos weeks before he had to record his parts.

The additional funding allowed the band to bring back mixer Julian Kindred, who mixed the Choir's Grammy-nominated 2000 album Flap Your Wings. "We really wanted him to mix this record," Daugherty said. "He's really creative, but it's hard to pin him down; he's real busy." In addition, Kindred had relocated to London, England, which was an additional production challenge. "Steve's on the phone with him, Skype-ing with him in the middle of the night," Daugherty continued. "It was down to the wire. We're going into mastering, and we're waiting for songs to be uploaded on his Dropbox over in England so we can download them to mastering, and make any changes we need to make. It was pretty funny, but we got it done."

The "thick" sound of the guitars on Shadow Weaver that both Daugherty and Byrd were determined to achieve was in large part due to Kindred's work. "We kind of give him free rein with our mixes: 'Do what you think you need to do.' And so, he takes a lot of liberties as far as effects," Daugherty said. "It's not easy to mix stuff like that, because there's so much of that mid-range energy going on that it's hard to get any kind of clarity out of it at all. But Julian, he did a great job."

As part of the Kickstarter effort, backers were able to pay for an opportunity to play on the album, and the band was initially uncertain about the quality of what would be recorded. Five backers contributed vocally or instrumentally to Shadow Weaver, including Thom Granger, former editor of CCM Magazine. The band was pleasantly surprised by the contributions, and were happy with the final results. Michaels said that because of the "community of involvement," the album "sounds more expensive." Hindalong agreed, emphasizing that "we didn't cut any corners; we’re very proud of the record."

== Composition ==
=== Music ===
"Now, [making music] is not really a struggle anymore. Sometimes, that's kind of the problem; it's easy, and you don't push yourself as much. And with this record, we had really decided from the very beginning we wanted to push ourselves a lot more."

— Derri Daugherty in 2014, regarding Shadow Weaver

For this release, Daugherty wanted an album that people would listen to from start to finish. "We wanted to start with a really cool mood, and end with a really cool mood," he said, "starting a little darker, and ending a little darker, going through the whole process of dark to light and back to dark." Daugherty also wanted to have musical segues, since the Choir hadn't used those on an album since 1990's Circle Slide. This was inspired by guitarist Byrd's significant participation in the recording sessions for Shadow Weaver. "One of the things that meant the most to me on this record is having Marc Byrd back," Daugherty explained. "He and I are very like-minded when it comes to guitar and musical tastes. We hear things on the same level, and we love the same kinds of music. I come up with melody lines for guitar, and then Marc fills it out with his beautiful, ambient noise. And it's just gorgeous stuff. It really meant a lot that we were doing that again. This was from the very beginning, both of us playing, like a real band would. [Previously,] Marc would come in and do his parts on the last two albums and then be done. This album wasn’t like that."

To that end, one of the first songs written for the album was the opener, "Good Morning, Shadow Weaver." Originally, this was intended as a single track, but the Choir decided to split it in half, with the second half serving as a reprise to bookend the record. This song, like several others on the album, was originally generated out of a jam session between Daugherty and Byrd at the latter's studio. Daugherty would play a guitar riff into a loop, then Byrd would play over it and build the track from there. In the case of "Two Clouds Are One," Daugherty and Byrd’s composition was essentially the final version, so Hindalong had to write lyrics to match, syllable by syllable.

The driving rock track "What You Think I Am," which Byrd claimed was many listeners' "favorite song on the album," represented to him what the Choir was as a band. The song is unique in that it features a horn section, something the Choir had never utilized up to that point. After hearing the "very metal" chord progression and the beat, Michaels was determined to create one, and worked on this contribution for hours at a time over several weeks in advance of recording. "I have this app that can put eight bars on a loop, and I would just sit there in my chair, and try all kinds of different parts. So, I came up with those parts during those turnarounds. It's my tenor sax, and it's doubled, and then through my Lyricon […] I've got these custom sounds that I got from this guy in Dayton, Ohio [who] programs, and one of them is this beautiful-sounding trombone. It sounds like a trombone, but it's me on the Lyricon doing little support lines underneath the sax. So, it's a recurring thing in there, and a great opportunity to bring out my old horn arrangement capabilities."

Another early track was "White Knuckles," which was written the first day that Daugherty, Hindalong and Byrd got together in the studio. Hindalong implemented a custom-made drum kit with maple shells that Hammock used in their studio for years, and modified it to include two hi-hats. "If you do a little thing like that to yourself, sometimes it makes you think of a different kind of beat," Hindalong explained. According to Daugherty, this is due to Hindalong's role in the band as lyricist. "His drumming is very much pattern-based. It's really thought out. A lot of it revolves around the lyric." Hindalong agreed. "I like very structured beats. I like the band the National, I like Larry Mullen from U2. I don't like crazy, reckless drumming. I get a lot of peace when things are brought into order. I want to play drums that way. Drums are the vehicle the song rides in. Since I wrote the lyrics, I care way more about the song than I do the drums. I don’t need to impress anybody."

According to Hindalong, his songwriting style tends to echo that of Neil Young, so two of his songs had to be musically reinvented to fit with the overall sonics of Shadow Weaver. The first was "It Hurts to Say Goodbye." At the time, Daugherty was listening to To the Happy Few by Medicine "non-stop," and that album featured a track with "acoustic guitars that were all distorted with these really pretty harmony vocals," so he took the song in that direction. Byrd then added a slide guitar at the end. "That’s my inner David Gilmour," he said. "It was one of those spontaneous moments where I'm going to go up the neck as high as I can. I just love the intensity of that." The other song was "The Soul of Every Creature Cries Out," which felt out of place on the album even after the acoustic guitars, drums and bass were all recorded. Daugherty then "deconstructed" the instrumentation and came up with a different guitar intro. "It was a trick to make that one fit," Daugherty said, "but it’s such a great lyric and such a great song and melody that we had to have it on there."

=== Lyrics ===
As is typical for a Choir record, the lyrics for several songs on the album were inspired by the relationships in Hindalong's life, including his daughters ("It Hurts to Say Goodbye") his then-wife Nancy ("The Antithesis of Blue") and even the Choir band members themselves ("Rhythm of the Road"). However, the remaining songs addressed more universal themes, including the complexity of individuals ("What You Think I Am"), the search for truth ("Everybody's Got a Guru," "The Soul of Every Creature Cries Out"), the reality of human suffering ("We All Know"), and post-coital euphoria ("Two Clouds Are One").

"There's nothing wrong with trying to figure out what we believe, and certainly not having community and worshiping God together. I think that's really important. But I think it's dangerous that we have God figured out. We are shadow weavers; we have epiphanies, we have moments of understanding. And then, we’re confused and we're lost."

— Steve Hindalong in 2014, in reference to the album's title and theme

"Everybody's Got a Guru" was considered by Hindalong to be the lyrical centerpiece of the album, and Byrd agreed: "The lyric is kind of where everybody is within the band. What's worse: to live with a closed mind, or to have an open mind? To have a defensive posture or an open posture? To be more compassionate or more judgmental?" While the first verse of the song referenced Hindalong's yoga instructor, the larger sentiment was that "we all have people we worship and idolize. I was really influenced by Bruce Cockburn. [But] it's dangerous to put people on a pedestal. We're just people."

Even though Hindalong and Byrd had co-written the highly-successful worship tune "God of Wonders," Hindalong considered "We All Know" to be his favorite collaboration with Byrd. At a high school marching band reunion Hindalong attended when on tour in Southern California, he reconnected with his first girlfriend, who mentioned she was going to bring blankets to a homeless family living out of their car; this inspired the lyrics to the first verse. "It’s cliché to say that the most personal things are the most universal, but it’s true," Hindalong said. "Life's hard. A lot happens to us all. It doesn't go the way we think it's going to go. The one thing about suffering is, it teaches us empathy. It teaches us how to love. And we are here to love one another. And that's one of the reasons I think we have to go through the pain we have to go through." Hindalong was also inspired by the scene towards the end of the film Wings of Desire in which the angel Damiel is hit in the head and bleeds. Tasting his own blood, he realizes he is now human. This imagery stayed with Hindalong for years, ultimately inspiring the lyrics in the chorus, "And you know you're alive / When you taste your own blood / Open hands to the sky / With your face in the mud."

This effort to write more universal themes was driven by Hindalong's respect for Daugherty's role in the band as lead vocalist. "I'm writing lyrics that Derri's going to sing, so I want him to own them. I try to write things from his perspective whenever I can." As a result, "Good Morning, Shadow Weaver" and its ending reprise not only musically opened and closed the album, but its lyrics did as well. "I love that it's a bookend," Byrd said. "Steve ends it with that lyric, 'What have you realized?' It's almost like asking the question, 'What did you learn from the record?'"

== Release ==
Shadow Weaver was initially released digitally and as a single CD in April 2014. One month later, the Choir provided a digital release of band commentary on every track from Daugherty, Hindalong, Chandler, Michaels and Byrd, along with mix stems for each track. When the double-disc vinyl was released in September 2014, it included a new studio recording of "Beautiful Girl," a track previously released as a digital single the prior year. In February 2017, the Choir reissued the entire album for free streaming and download via NoiseTrade, including the band commentary tracks, the album version of "Beautiful Girl," and three additional bonus tracks.

Stretch goals of the Kickstarter campaign generated three additional releases: the live albums Live and on the Wing in Music City and The Livestream Bootleg, and the band’s first Christmas release, the EP Peace, Love & Light. Peace, Love & Light would precede the release of Shadow Weaver in late 2013, and the two live releases would follow in 2014 and 2015.

Shadow Weaver was released for digital download on iTunes and is now widely available on various music streaming platforms.

=== Live and on the Wing in Music City ===
Because the Choir did not tour in support of this album, the band opted to perform and record two live shows back-to-back on July 26, 2014, and livestream both performances. In partnership with MXL Microphones, Marshall Electronics, and StreamVu TV, the event was held at Studio Instrument Rentals in Nashville, Tennessee, and the live concerts featured the entire band, along with Christy Byrd on background vocals and additional percussion. As a result of an additional stretch goal from the Kickstarter campaign, seventeen tracks were then released as a live album entitled Live and on the Wing in Music City, and this was made available as a digital download to Kickstarter backers in November 2014. This concert would receive a physical release in 2016 in a CD/DVD combo as part of a stretch goal for the Circle Slide 25th Anniversary Kickstarter campaign. The video of the concert is now freely available on YouTube. In a 2014 review for Jesus Freak Hideout, writer Alex Caldwell called the live album an "epic document of one band's journey through the years," and added that while the Choir has released previous live recordings, "none covers the scope and sheer sonic breadth of their catalog and live prowess like the new Live And On The Wing In Music City."

=== The Livestream Bootleg ===
To publicize the launch of the Kickstarter campaign, the Choir streamed a live concert on October 1, 2013 that featured a selection of songs from the band's catalog, conversations with the band, and a cover of Bad Company's "Shooting Star." Although recorded months before the Choir would go into the studio to work on Shadow Weaver, and before the July 2014 concerts that generated Live and on the Wing in Music City, this initial live project would be the final stretch goal to be delivered in March 2015. To date, this official live album has not received a physical release.

== Critical reception ==
Professional ratings
Review scores
Source	Rating
CCM Magazine	4/5 stars
Christian Musician	Favorable
World	Favorable
Jesus Freak Hideout	4.5/5 stars
Apple Music	Favorable
True Tunes	Favorable
The Phantom Tollbooth	4/5 stars
PopDose	Favorable
The Banner	Favorable
Down the Line	Favorable

Critical response to Shadow Weaver was widely favorable. Bert Saraco of CCM Magazine said the "shimmering guitars, reverb-drenched vocals and the signature wall of fuzz-box sound make this album a delight for long-time fans of The Choir," and in two reviews of Shadow Weaver from Jesus Freak Hideout, both Mark Rice and Bert Gangl agreed. Rice said "this impeccably written, melancholy storm of emotion and experience is a poster child for quality," while Gangl added that "it's a great effort, period—and one which proves, yet again, that the muse that rendered the band so singularly poignant when they first made their debut in the mid-1980s, shines just as brightly here in the present day, some thirty years later." Shawn McLaughlin of Christian Musician also agreed, calling Shadow Weaver "music that is as vital, challenging and purposefully artful as anything out there, today," and added that the band is "seemingly […] just starting to reach their creative apex." Apple Music's editorial review was similarly effusive, claiming that Derri Daugherty's "angelic lead vocals are at once otherworldly and deeply human. If Shadow Weaver leans toward the melancholic, it’s a beautiful sadness that can melt the hardest heart."

While The Phantom Tollbooth awarded the band four out of five stars for the album, writer Derek Walker was a bit more critical, saying that "while some tracks show a new lease of energy, others ("Rhythm of the Road") tend towards filler. Long-term fans may also question whether Daugherty is starting to recycle some tunes." Arsenio Orteza, writing for World, disagreed. Calling the Choir "CCM's most artful band for nearly 30 years," he wrote that "the musical incarnation of the intersection between faith and doubt that does aural justice to both" was most represented by "White Knuckles," and that the Choir finishes "a close second with everything else." Dw. Dunphy from PopDose shared similar sentiments, saying, "let's be clear that this is not just a monolith of feedback and reverb. With Byrd and Hindalong firmly in the mix, these are songs, not experiments. The offerings on the disc are well-rounded." Paul Delger at The Banner also highlighted the album's musicianship, writing that "the guitar talent steals the spotlight. In several songs, powerful guitar sounds opening and closing the pieces create definite "wow" moments." Joshua Lory at Down the Line praised the album’s "darker musical vibe" and "big spacey soundscapes," comparing Shadow Weaver favorably to the band’s 1988 release Chase the Kangaroo and even the Cure’s Disintegration. Echoing that sentiment, John Thompson of True Tunes said of the Choir, "if you loved them in the '80s or '90s and have lost track, let this record be your re-introduction."

=== Accolades ===
- NoiseTrade
  - Best of 2014 (So Far) (included in list)
- Think Christian
  - Top Ten Albums of 2014 (#6)
- Under the Radar
  - Top 11 Gourmet Albums of 2014 (#8)
- UTR Media
  - 30 Best Gourmet Albums of the Decade (2010-2019) (included in list)

== Track listing ==
All lyrics by Steve Hindalong. All music by Derri Daugherty, Steve Hindalong and Marc Byrd, except where noted.

Standard edition (CD)
No.	Title	Music	Length
1.	"Good Morning, Shadow Weaver"		3:19
2.	"What You Think I Am"		4:32
3.	"It Hurts to Say Goodbye"		6:59
4.	"Get Gone"	Daugherty, Hindalong	4:07
5.	"We All Know"	Byrd, Hindalong	4:58
6.	"Two Clouds Are One"	Daugherty	1:44
7.	"White Knuckles"		4:43
8.	"Everybody's Got a Guru"		4:39
9.	"The Soul of Every Creature Cries Out"	Hindalong	4:19
10.	"Frequency of Light"		1:31
11.	"Rhythm of the Road"	Byrd, Hindalong	5:08
12.	"The Antithesis of Blue"	Daugherty, Hindalong	4:47
13.	"Shadow Weaver Reprise"		5:34
Total length:			56:20

Vinyl release bonus track
No.	Title	Music	Length
14.	"Beautiful Girl (Album Version)"	Daugherty	4:42
Total length:			61:02

2017 NoiseTrade release bonus tracks
No.	Title	Music	Length
15.	"To Cover You (Live from District Drugs)"	Daugherty, Hindalong	3:43
16.	"After All (featuring Leigh Nash)"	Daugherty, Hindalong	4:59
17.	"Rhythm of the Road (Alternate Version)"	Byrd, Hindalong	3:37
Total length:			73:21

Band commentary (Digital download)
No.	Title	Length
1.	"Good Morning, Shadow Weaver - Commentary"	3:19
2.	"What You Think I Am - Commentary"	4:34
3.	"It Hurts to Say Goodbye - Commentary"	7:01
4.	"Get Gone - Commentary"	4:09
5.	"We All Know - Commentary"	5:00
6.	"Two Clouds Are One - Commentary"	1:46
7.	"White Knuckles - Commentary"	4:45
8.	"Everybody's Got a Guru - Commentary"	4:39
9.	"The Soul of Every Creature Cries Out - Commentary"	4:18
10.	"Frequency of Light - Commentary"	1:30
11.	"Rhythm of the Road - Commentary"	5:10
12.	"The Antithesis of Blue - Commentary"	4:49
13.	"Shadow Weaver Reprise - Commentary"	5:34
Total length:		56:34

Live and on the Wing in Music City (Digital download)
No.	Title	Music	Length
1.	"Midnight Sun"	Daugherty, Hindalong	4:07
2.	"White Knuckles"		4:22
3.	"What You Think I Am"		3:34
4.	"Sad Face"	Daugherty, Hindalong, Tim Chandler	5:06
5.	"Consider"	Daugherty, Hindalong, Chandler	3:48
6.	"Children of Time"	Daugherty, Hindalong, Chandler	4:45
7.	"Clouds"	Daugherty, Steve Griffith	4:33
8.	"Mercy Will Prevail"	Daugherty	3:43
9.	"We All Know"	Byrd, Hindalong	4:48
10.	"The Forest"	Daugherty, Hindalong	4:27
11.	"Cross That River"	Daugherty, Hindalong	6:04
12.	"Yellow Skies"	Daugherty	3:37
13.	"A Sentimental Song"	Daugherty, Hindalong	4:35
14.	"Circle Slide"	Daugherty, Hindalong	8:19
15.	"Tear For Tear"	Daugherty, Hindalong	1:28
16.	"About Love"	Daugherty, Hindalong	4:01
17.	"Beautiful Scandalous Night"	Daugherty	4:08
Total length:			75:25

The Livestream Bootleg (Digital download)
No.	Title	Music	Length
1.	"Intro"		0:39
2.	"To Cover You"	Daugherty, Hindalong	2:33
3.	"A Sentimental Song"	Daugherty, Hindalong	4:09
4.	"Choir Conversation #1"		0:25
5.	"The Forest"	Daugherty, Hindalong	4:35
6.	"Choir Conversation #2"		3:58
7.	"Beautiful Girl"	Daugherty	4:54
8.	"Choir Conversation #3"		1:18
9.	"All Night Long"	Daugherty, Hindalong	2:57
10.	"Choir Conversation #4"		3:36
11.	"Yellow Haired Monkeys"	Daugherty, Hindalong	1:19
12.	"Choir Conversation #5"		1:56
13.	"Enough to Love"	Daugherty	3:28
14.	"Choir Conversation #6"		4:15
15.	"Between Bare Trees"	Daugherty, Hindalong	3:56
16.	"Choir Conversation #7"		3:05
17.	"Midnight Sun"	Daugherty, Hindalong	3:58
18.	"Choir Conversation #8"		5:12
19.	"To Bid Farewell"	Daugherty, Hindalong	2:55
20.	"Shooting Star"	Paul Rodgers	4:01
21.	"Outro"		0:21
Total length:			63:31

Mix stems (Digital download)
No.	Title	Length
1.	"Antithesis of Blue [Stems]"
2.	"Everybody's Got a Guru [Stems]"
3.	"Frequency of Light [Stems]"
4.	"Gonna Get Gone [Stems]"
5.	"It Hurts to Say Goodbye [Stems]"
6.	"Rhythm of the Road [Stems]"
7.	"Shadow Weaver Reprise [Stems]"
8.	"The Soul of Every Creature [Stems]"
9.	"Two Clouds Are One [Stems]"
10.	"We All Know [Stems]"
11.	"What You Think I Am [Stems]"
12.	"White Knuckles [Stems]"

== Personnel ==
=== Shadow Weaver ===
Personnel taken from Shadow Weaver liner notes.

The Choir

- Derri Daugherty – guitars, vocals
- Steve Hindalong – drums, percussion
- Tim Chandler – bass
- Dan Michaels – sax, horns, Lyricon
- Marc Byrd – guitars, keys

Guest performers

- Christy Byrd – vocals
- Andrew Thompson – harmonium ("Frequency of Light")
- Tammy Bosley – vocals ("Shadow Weaver" and "Get Gone")
- Ron Bosley – acoustic twelve-string guitar ("Get Gone")
- Jim Schreck – electric guitars ("White Knuckles" and "Shadow Weaver Reprise")
- Sean Celli – electric guitars ("Everybody's Got a Guru" and "The Antithesis of Blue")
- Thom Granger – bass drum, bell rope, wine glass ("Everybody's Got a Guru"), anvil ("Rhythm of the Road")

Production

- Derri Daugherty – producer
- Steve Hindalong – producer
- Marc Byrd – producer
- Sean Celli – executive producer
- Dan Michaels – executive producer
- Lisa Michaels – handler
- Chris Knight – photography
- Tom Gulotta – design, layout and additional art

=== Live and on the Wing in Music City ===
Personnel taken from Live and on the Wing in Music City liner notes.

The Choir

- Derri Daugherty – guitars, vocals
- Steve Hindalong – drums, vocals
- Tim Chandler – bass
- Dan Michaels – sax, Lyricon
- Marc Byrd – guitar

Guest performer

- Christine Byrd – vocals, percussion

Production

- The Choir – producer
- Dan Michaels – executive producer
- Lisa Michaels – executive producer
- Russ Long - recording
- Garrett Callahan - recording assistance
- Oliver Long - recording assistance
- Steve Broderson - artwork (cover), design (packaging)
- Recorded at SIR, Nashville, Tennessee
- Mixed at The Carport
- Mastered at Garage Masters
- Designed at Cruxial Creative, LLC
- Pressed at GZ Media

=== The Livestream Bootleg ===
Personnel taken from The Livestream Bootleg Kickstarter release update.

The Choir

- Derri Daugherty – guitars, vocals
- Steve Hindalong – drums, vocals
- Tim Chandler – bass
- Dan Michaels – sax, Lyricon

Production

- The Choir – producer
- Derri Daugherty – mixing
- Lisa Michaels - interviews
- Bruce Neher - editing, mixing, cover art
- Mixed at Disc & Dat
