= Bloodshot =

Bloodshot may refer to:

== Music ==
- Bloodshot (The J. Geils Band album) (1973)
- Bloodshot (Choir album) (2018)
- "Bloodshot" (song), a 2019 song by Dove Cameron
- Bloodshot Records, a record label

== Other uses ==
- Bloodshot (comics), a Valiant comic book series
- Bloodshot (film), a 2020 film based on the comic
- Blood Shot (novel), a 1988 novel by Sara Paretsky
- Bloodshot (video game), a 1994 video game by Domark
- Condemned 2: Bloodshot, a 2008 video game

== See also ==
- Conjunctivitis
- Red eye (medicine)
