= O How the Mighty Have Fallen =

Studio album by The Choir
- Released: April 18, 2005
- Recorded: 2005
- Studios: Roswell East, Nashville, Tennessee
- Genres: Alternative rock; indie rock
- Length: 40:28
- Label: Galaxy21
- Producer: Marc Byrd

The Choir chronology
Live at Cornerstone 2000: Unplugged (2000)	O How the Mighty Have Fallen (2005)	Burning Like the Midnight Sun (2010)

The Choir studio albums chronology
Flap Your Wings (2000)	O How the Mighty Have Fallen (2005)	Burning Like the Midnight Sun (2010)

O How The Mighty Have Fallen is the 11th studio release, and tenth full-length studio album, by alternative rock band the Choir, released in 2005. Guitarist Marc Byrd officially became the fifth member of the band with this album.

== Background ==
After receiving a Grammy Award nomination in 2002 for Flap Your Wings, along with years of interacting with fans on the Choir’s official website, the band was encouraged to go back into the studio and record another album. This time, the Choir turned over producing duties to Byrd, who had previously worked with lead singer and guitarist Derri Daugherty and drummer and lyricist Steve Hindalong on a variety of other musical projects, primarily the City on a Hill worship music series, as well as albums from Glisten, Between Thieves and Byrd’s previous band, Common Children. This was the Choir’s first album in 20 years not co-produced by Daugherty and Hindalong, and the duo’s transition away from producing this album was a natural evolution, according to Hindalong: “We haven’t made a record for five years, but we’ve been in the studio non-stop doing one thing after the other, and so much of the time, Marc’s been a part of our world. So, it [was] no step at all to say, ‘Hey, you be the producer.’ Marc is like a brother to us. He’s ten years younger. We wanted it to be cool, and we respect his sensibility so much.”

== Recording and production ==
Because Byrd shouldered the production duties, Hindalong remarked that his work helped to “bring harmony amongst us all.” Daugherty agreed, saying, “this was definitely the easiest record for me that I’ve done with the Choir. At this point in our career, there are no expectations of anything. We just get to make a record, we go in and make it, we talk about what we want to talk about, and make the music we want to make. We don’t have A&R guy or record company saying ‘Oh, we need a radio hit,’ or ‘We need a remix of this.’ Dan Michaels tries to do that sometimes to us, and then we just get him out of the room.”

"At this point, we don’t make our living off the Choir. I mean, the Choir never paid. It never did. We don’t need it to, now. We’re fortunate to stop and just do this. As long as we’re satisfied with it musically, that’s the only objective."

— Steve Hindalong, discussing O How the Mighty Have Fallen in 2006

As the band’s main lyricist, Hindalong did not go into this album with any preconceived ideas. The lyrical content of O How the Mighty Have Fallen was described as “comfortable with its own brokenness,” and Hindalong agreed. “The Choir’s always been an open book about our struggle with relationships. So many of the songs have been about my struggle with my wife; it’s been rough for us. We’re still married, but we’re open about that stuff. We’re just flawed, broken, struggling people, and we still have faith and Jesus is still who He is, and He did what He did, and He does what He does.” Hindalong credited the openness of his lyrics to the response of long-time listeners: “It’s very satisfying, the impact that I feel like our songs have had. People carry them in their hearts and there’s something special about our music to individuals. It’s become motivation enough.”

The recording process was more straightforward musically, as Daugherty and Hindalong could focus solely on their own musical contributions. All decisions about the album’s guitar work was left to Daugherty and Byrd, and Hindalong worked on strengthening his own drum performance. “I don’t play the drums much anymore. I mostly produce other guys who play the drums,” he said. “I got to play a lot of the keyboards on the album, which is fun. A drummer getting to play a melodic instrument? ‘I’m a real musician!’”

== Artwork and packaging ==
This is the first Choir album cover to feature a band member's child. Daugherty’s late son Chance is presented as the “boy with wings” on the front cover.

== Release ==
O How the Mighty Have Fallen was the first Choir album to be released by Galaxy21, the independent label created by saxophone and Lyricon player Michaels, who also served as the band’s manager. The album was released on April 18, 2005 in the CD format only, and was initially available on the band’s official website. It was later released for digital download on iTunes and is now widely available on various music streaming platforms.

== Critical reception ==
Professional ratings
Review scores
Source	Rating
CCM Magazine	A
The Christian Century	Favorable
Cross Rhythms	7/10 stars
Hybrid Magazine	Favorable
The Phantom Tollbooth	4.5/5 stars
Somewhere Cold	Favorable

Reviews for O How The Mighty Have Fallen were mostly positive. Ben Hill, writing for The Phantom Tollbooth, said this was "one of their strongest albums since 1994's Speckled Bird," and have "proven with this album that they are certainly capable of recapturing the magic of their classic albums while managing to stay innovative." Louis R. Carzolo at The Christian Century agreed, saying that the album "is a sparkling record built on simple but effective pop strengths." He also wrote a more expansive review for CCM Magazine, where he praised the album for being "a joy, solid in its musical, lyrical and thematic execution," and called the band "passionate innovators." He added that without the Choir, "it's possible there would be no Switchfoot, no O.C. Supertones—and beyond SoCal, no sense of how to do Christian rock right."

However, some reviews were more mixed. Matt Crossman at Cross Rhythms complained that the album "rarely accelerated out of second gear. Several tunes could easily have featured at any time in the band's career, and overall feel achingly familiar." This was echoed in the review from Somewhere Cold webzine, with the statement that "the songs on this CD still retain a rather conventional feel," even though "the music is well-arranged, well-produced, and features touching lyrics that speak about a variety of life issues." L. Keane at Hybrid Magazine agreed with the latter statement, saying that O How The Mighty Have Fallen was "a memorable and relatable listening experience," and was "warmly comfortable on first listen, like the homecoming of an old friend who has been too long gone."

== Track listing ==
All lyrics by Steve Hindalong. All music by Derri Daugherty, unless otherwise noted.

No.	Title	Music	Length
1.	"O How the Mighty Have Fallen"	Marc Byrd	4:37
2.	"Nobody Gets a Smooth Ride"	Tim Chandler	4:01
3.	"She's Alright"		4:04
4.	"Enough to Love"		4:27
5.	"Terrible Mystery"		4:52
6.	"We Give We Take"	Byrd	3:47
7.	"Fine Fun Time"		3:43
8.	"How I Wish I Knew"	Byrd	3:58
9.	"Mercy Will Prevail"	Byrd, Daugherty, Chandler	3:38
10.	"To Rescue Me"		3:21
Total length:			40:28

== Personnel ==
Personnel taken from O How the Mighty Have Fallen liner notes.

The Choir

- Derri Daugherty - lead vocals, guitars
- Steve Hindalong - drums, percussion
- Tim Chandler - bass guitar
- Dan Michaels - saxophone, Lyricon
- Marc Byrd - guitars, vocals

Additional musicians

- Matt Slocum - cello
- Gabe Martinez - harmony vocals ("She's Alright")

Production

- Dan Michaels – executive producer
- Marc Byrd – producer
- Jordan Richter – recording
- Kindred – additional overdubs
- Shane D. Wilson – mixing at the Pentavarit
- Chris Henning – additional mixing
- Ken Love – mastering at Master Mix
- Brian Heydn – layout and design
- Thomas Petillo – photography and cover concept
- Chance Daugherty – "boy with wings"
