= Kissers and Killers =

Studio album by The Choir
- Released: March 1993
- Recorded: 1990, 1992
- Studios: Neverland Studios, Cerritos, California; Pakaderm Studios, Los Alamitos, California; Fingerprint Recorders, Montrose, California
- Genre: Alternative rock
- Length: 32:33
- Labels: Independent release (1993); Galaxy21 (2018)
- Producers: Derri Daugherty; Steve Hindalong

The Choir chronology
Circle Slide (1990)	Kissers and Killers (1993)	Speckled Bird (1994)

Kissers and Killers is the seventh studio release, and the sixth full-length studio album, from alternative rock band the Choir, released in 1993. It was their first release after leaving Myrrh Records, and according to drummer and lyricist Steve Hindalong, represented a major turning point for the band: "We went independent after this, and never were on a label where there were expectations of any kind of a 'ministry' or anything like that."

== Background ==
After the tour for Circle Slide was completed, the Choir and Myrrh Records parted ways, and the band fractured, with individual members pursuing other creative opportunities. Hindalong began producing other artists, including the Prayer Chain and Ric Alba, former bass guitarist for the Altar Boys. Saxophone and Lyricon player Dan Michaels recorded his solo EP Reveal, then began playing sax on tour for mainstream contemporary Christian performers Bryan Duncan and Crystal Lewis. Lead singer and guitarist Derri Daugherty co-founded the Lost Dogs, a "supergroup" of lead singers from the foremost Christian alternative rock bands: Daugherty from the Choir, Terry Taylor from Daniel Amos, Michael Roe from the 77's and Gene Eugene from Adam Again. The group's first album, Scenic Routes, was released in 1992.

Although the Choir had consistently voiced their frustrations over lack of Christian radio play and mainstream distribution, the band was still perceived as "leaders in the expanding Christian alternative scene." As a result, Myrrh's parent company, Word Records, came to Daugherty and offered him a production deal and a new label, as Word was trying to bolster its roster of modern artists. "I remember thinking that as far as we’d come, we should either do this label together or the band would probably fall apart," Daugherty said. Glasshouse Records was founded, and would release projects from Alba, the Throes, John Austin and blues artist Reverend Dan Smith.

One of the most significant projects the Choir worked on during this period was At the Foot of the Cross, Volume One: Clouds, Rain, Fire, which was arguably the first "modern worship" album, a concept that would later become popular in Christian music throughout the 2000s. Although the album featured such notable contributors as Phil Keaggy, Bob Bennett, Buddy and Julie Miller and Michael Knott, the album sold poorly, likely due to the Choir's dogged artistic commitment: "'Beautiful Scandalous Night' […] is a Christian radio song if we’ve ever written one," Hindalong said. "And it's sincere and from the heart; nothing phony about it. And we could have brought it home, production-wise. But no, we had to put that backwards guitar loop in there, and get a good backbeat on the snare." This proved costly, and the album quickly went out of print.

Even with their own imprint at their disposal, the Choir opted instead to record a collection of demos that they could independently shop around to mainstream record labels, and after a year and a half of playing clubs, the band even considered changing their name to Kissers and Killers. The Choir played showcases of their new material in New York City and Los Angeles, and although three labels expressed interest (I.R.S. Records, Geffen Records and Fiction Records), all three ultimately passed, being unwilling to market a band in their early thirties to a teenage-focused Lollapalooza audience. "In retrospect, it would have been smarter to put out another Choir record on Glasshouse and build the company," Hindalong recounted, "but we really believed we had to take that chance. Besides, I just wanted to hear my songs on the radio."

== Recording and production ==
Bass guitarist Tim Chandler officially returned to the band lineup with "rekindled enthusiasm" for this album, and Kissers and Killers was recorded at Daugherty's Neverland Studios in Cerritos, California in 1992, just after the At the Foot of the Cross worship album was completed. The song "Let the Sky Fall" was built upon tracks recorded in 1990, as it was originally intended for Circle Slide; however, the band and A&R rep Tom Willett agreed it didn't fit with the tone of that album, so it was finished for Kissers and Killers instead.

This would be the last album the band would record in Southern California, before Daugherty, Hindalong and Michaels chose to move across the country to Nashville, Tennessee in the latter part of 1993. The contemporary Christian music industry was centered there, which presented more opportunities for the band members to work with other artists; the cost of living also was less expensive, and it was a central location for touring.

All of the songs on this album, with the exception of "Let the Sky Fall," would later be remixed at the new Neverland Studios in Nashville for release as part of the band's next album Speckled Bird.

== Composition ==
=== Music ===
Jettisoning the ambient textures of Circle Slide, Kissers and Killers instead focused on straightforward rock song structures with aggressive guitar lines and feedback. "The sonics were way different," Hindalong said, "because this was the '90s." Daugherty was listening heavily to shoegaze bands like My Bloody Valentine, Curve, and Swervedriver, and this influenced his guitar work on the album. Daugherty used a Groove Tubes guitar emulator for many of the tracks, which were also recorded in mono, as opposed to the stereo effects that were dominant on past albums. Daugherty would also employ an E-bow and a Fuzztame on "Amazing," as well as a MXR Distortion+ unit on "Weather Girl," the latter of which was influenced by the guitar work of Bob Mould.

Hindalong's drumming became more chaotic, "like a kid who ate too much Halloween candy." "The drums were so busy, rather than the regimented '80s," Hindalong added. This proved challenging for some songs – in particular, the opening track, "Gripped," which Hindalong considered "intimidating." It took him three days to get the proper drumbeat on tape, as "there was no Pro Tools back then." Because of this, a mistake where Hindalong accidentally hit the microphone with a doumbeck on the recording of "Grace" had to be physically cut out and replaced with a backwards percussion effect, then overdubbed with a cymbal crash to hide the final edit.

This was the first Choir album on which Michaels received a musical credit, as he was playing a chord progression on Daugherty's Epiphone Sheraton guitar while Daugherty was out of the studio. The band liked how this melody was developing, and it was expanded into "Weather Girl."

=== Lyrics ===
The twin strands of worshipful meditations and more earthbound love songs that marked past Choir albums unraveled with Kissers and Killers, which was exclusively about the complexities of romantic love and obsession. The band had just completed a worship album and opted to focus on non-faith content with this release.

While Hindalong admitted that "I [didn’t] know what was going on in my head a lot of the time," the album's lyrics were still influenced by events in his life. A key example is "Amazing," as the opening lines, "Amazing how slugs know / More about the weather," came from Hindalong's time spent working at a hardware store. "One old man [...] would come in, and he just knew everything about everything. 'I never pay attention to the weatherman; I knew it would rain today, because the snails were climbing halfway up the walls.' Animals have this insight that we don’t have." However, when looking back at the lyrics for "Weather Girl," Hindalong expressed unease: "I don’t like how it puts the blame on the woman. I would never write anything like this now."

Chandler co-wrote lyrics for a Choir song for the first time on this album, providing the second verse to Kissers and Killers' title track. The lyric "My brother is a broker" was inspired by the actual career of Michaels' brother, and Hindalong claimed the message of the lyrics was essentially an early version of "What You Think I Am" on 2014's Shadow Weaver.

== Release ==
Kissers and Killers was released independently on CD and cassette in March 1993. According to Hindalong, only 6,300 copies were made.

=== Kissers and Killers — The Acoustic Sessions ===
In early 2018, the band mounted a Kickstarter campaign for a newly-recorded acoustic version of Kissers and Killers, which would also include a 25th anniversary remastered version of the original 1993 release. In July 2018, both The Acoustic Sessions and the newly-remastered version of the album were released on streaming services and CD, with the remastered album also receiving a vinyl release; this was the first time Kissers and Killers was issued on the latter format, and it came in red and white vinyl options. The two-CD set included both The Acoustic Sessions and the remastered album on separate discs. In August 2020, the band also released a digital download of audio commentary for each of the album's eight tracks from Hindalong, Daugherty and Michaels.

== Critical reception ==
Professional ratings
Review scores
Source	Rating
CCM Magazine	Favorable
Notebored	Favorable
Cross Rhythms	9/10 stars
AllMusic	3/5 stars

Kissers and Killers was received well upon initial release. Writing for CCM Magazine, Bruce A. Brown said that the "fully realized songs" are "as good as any the band has ever written," pointing out that Kissers and Killers was "more of a transitional work, probably more indicative of where the band is headed than where it is at the moment." Brown highlighted Daugherty's musical contributions, saying that his "distortion-soaked guitar is right in your face, a counterpoint to his mellow voice." Brown also praised Hindalong's "delicate wordplay" on "Grace" as well as "the late Mark Heard's accordion flourishes" on "Let the Sky Fall." In the lead review for the July/August 1993 issue of Notebored, critic Steven L. Roth highlighted the impact of 1990s-era rock by stating that the album was "buried under a little more reverb and distortion than what they’ve recorded in the past, indicating a faint signal of how far and wide the 'industrial revolution' has spread." On the shift in lyrical focus, Roth added that "it is on Kissers and Killers that this tangled and painfully real representation of the little thing we call love is further expanded and scrutinized," and praised Hindalong's "resistance to conventionality" for "juxtaposing apples and oranges in an effort to avoid anything remotely close to a cliché." Liz Liew, writing for Cross Rhythms, said that on Kissers and Killers, "Derri's guitar effects are more expressive, pronounced and creative," and added that the album should give the Choir a "well-deserved break with a mainstream label."

Retrospective reviews have also been favorable. Writing for Allmusic, critic Darryl Cater called Kissers and Killers "a pretty polished indie album, and […] also one of their most aggressive. The familiar melodic pop sensibility is still audible, but Derri Daugherty's amiable vocals are surrounded by his growling and hissing guitars. It makes for an interesting combination." Mark Allan Powell, writing in the Encyclopedia of Contemporary Christian Music, called the album's eight songs "little more than an EP," but highlighted that "'Yellow Skies' and 'Weather Girl' have a harder edge musically than most of The Choir's material. On the latter tune, Daugherty tries to copy Neil Young and ends up producing the best guitar sounds of his career."

== Track listing ==
All lyrics by Steve Hindalong and all music by Derri Daugherty, unless otherwise noted.

No.	Title	Lyrics	Music	Length
1.	"Gripped"			4:20
2.	"Amazing"			3:46
3.	"Kissers and Killers"	Steve Hindalong, Tim Chandler	Derri Daugherty, Hindalong, Chandler	2:57
4.	"Weather Girl"		Dan Michaels, Daugherty, Hindalong, Chandler	5:51
5.	"Yellow Skies"			3:43
6.	"Grace"			3:08
7.	"Let the Sky Fall"		Hindalong	3:36
8.	"Love Your Mind"		Daugherty, Hindalong, Chandler	5:12
Total length:				32:33

Crowdfunded bonus studio album (CD) — Kissers and Killers - The Acoustic Sessions
No.	Title	Lyrics	Music	Length
1.	"Gripped"			3:18
2.	"Amazing"			3:45
3.	"Kissers and Killers"	Hindalong, Chandler	Daugherty, Hindalong, Chandler	3:07
4.	"Weather Girl"		Michaels, Daugherty, Hindalong, Chandler	4:03
5.	"Yellow Skies"			3:16
6.	"Grace"			3:13
7.	"Let the Sky Fall"		Hindalong	3:04
8.	"Love Your Mind"		Daugherty, Hindalong, Chandler	4:26
Total length:				28:12

25th anniversary remaster – Band Commentary (digital download)
No.	Title	Length
1.	"Choir Commentary: Kissers and Killers"	34:11
Total length:		34:11

== Personnel ==
=== Kissers and Killers ===
Personnel taken from Kissers and Killers liner notes.

The Choir

- Derri Daugherty – lead vocals, guitars, bass guitar
- Steve Hindalong – drums, percussion, lead vocals on "Let the Sky Fall"
- Tim Chandler – bass guitar
- Dan Michaels – saxophone, Lyricon

Additional musicians

- Chris Colbert – guitar ("Amazing," "Kissers and Killers")
- Mark Heard – accordion ("Let the Sky Fall")

Production

- Derri Daugherty – producer, recording, mixing
- Steve Hindalong – producer
- Dave Hackbarth – recording, mixing
- Jr. McNeely – mixing ("Gripped," "Amazing")
- Mark Heard – recording: 1990 (accordion, harmonica, drums, acoustic guitars), 1993 (bass, electric guitars and vocals)
- Doug Doyle – mastering (Digital Brothers)
- Leiza Schmidt – art direction, photography
- Gene Ray George – art layout, design assistance
- Todd Goodman – executive producer [2018 remaster]
- Marc Ludena – art direction [2018 remaster]
- Kevin Fromer – remastering (EnergyGlass) [2018 remaster]
- Jeffrey Kotthoff – CD reissue coordinator [2018 remaster]

=== Kissers and Killers — The Acoustic Sessions ===
Personnel taken from Kissers and Killers - The Acoustic Sessions liner notes.

The Choir

- Derri Daugherty – lead vocals, acoustic guitar, handclaps
- Steve Hindalong – percussion, vocals, lead vocals on "Let the Sky Fall," acoustic guitar, glockenspiel, marxophone, harmonica, handclaps
- Dan Michaels – tenor saxophone, baritone saxophone

Additional musicians

- Stephen Leiweke – acoustic guitar, piano, handclaps
- Matt Slocum – cello
- Chris Donohue – upright double bass
- Christa Wells – vocals

Production

- Dan Michaels – executive producer
- Lisa Michaels – executive producer, handler
- Stephen Leiweke – producer, recording, mixing
- Steve Hindalong – producer
