= The Choir (alternative rock band) =

American alternative rock band

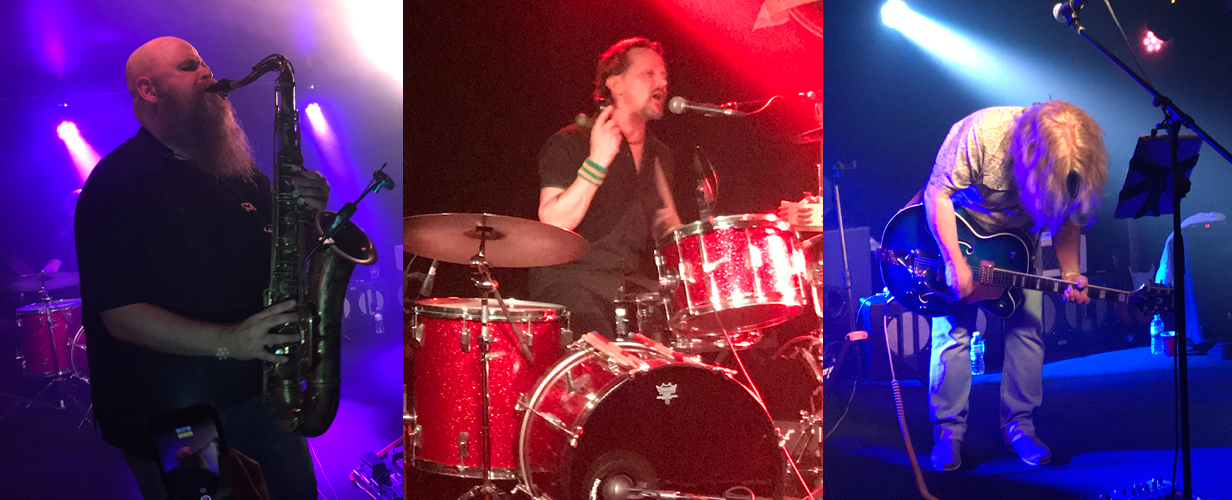
- The Choir in April 2017. L to R: Dan Michaels, Steve Hindalong, Derri Daugherty.

Background information
- Also known as: Youth Choir (1983-1985)
- Origin: Orange County, California
- Genres: Alternative rock, Indie rock, Christian alternative rock
- Years active: 1983–present
- Labels: Broken; Shadow; Myrrh_{LA}; Myrrh; A&M; Epic; R.E.X.; Tattoo; The Choir.net; Millennium 8; Galaxy21; Word; Curb/Word; Provident/Sony
- Members: Derri Daugherty; Steve Hindalong; Dan Michaels
- Past members: Tim Chandler; Mike Sauerbrey; Robin Spurs; Marc Byrd
- Website: thechoir.net

The Choir is an atmospheric alternative rock band currently comprising Derri Daugherty on guitar and lead vocals, Steve Hindalong on drums and percussion, and Dan Michaels on saxophone and Lyricon. Long-time bass guitarist Tim Chandler died in 2018, and guitarist Marc Byrd was the fifth member of the band between 2005–2014. The Choir's industry accolades include a GMA Dove Award for Alternative/Modern Rock Album of the Year in 1996 and a Grammy nomination for Best Rock Gospel Album at the 44th Annual Grammy Awards in 2002.

As of 2026, the band has commercially released 23 full-length studio albums, three EPs, eight live albums, one single-disc compilation album, one retrospective box set, and is still actively recording new material.

== History ==
=== Southern California period (1983–1993) ===
The Choir was originally formed as Youth Choir in the early 1980s by Daugherty and Hindalong. Chandler, who was also the bass guitarist for Daniel Amos, introduced Hindalong to Daugherty, who was the band's roadie and sound man. The two quickly became friends, and Youth Choir got its start within the Calvary Chapel Christian punk and alternative music scene, which also included the bands Undercover, Crumbächer, Altar Boys and 4-4-1.

The band's first official recording was the track "It's So Wonderful," released in 1983 on the compilation album What's Shakin', which also included early work from Undercover, Altar Boys and The Lifters. This song was one of the few times that Daugherty wrote both lyrics and music; as the band developed, the majority of the Choir's lyrical output would come from Hindalong. As Youth Choir, they released their debut album Voices in Shadows in 1985, with Mike Sauerbrey on bass; their first EP Shades of Gray followed a year later, when Dan Michaels joined the band.

The Choir made a high-profile move to Myrrh Records in 1986 with their next release, Diamonds and Rain. Dropping the "Youth" from their moniker, they would be known as "The Choir" from that point forward. This was followed by three more albums for Myrrh, which featured musical contributions from an array of performers, including Charlie Peacock, Mark Heard, Steve Griffith of Vector and Gene Eugene and Riki Michele from Adam Again. The Choir's lineup also changed. Chandler was the primary bass player through the recording sessions for Chase the Kangaroo, released in 1988; however, Robin Spurs replaced him on the tour for that album, as well as the recording sessions and tour for the band's follow-up, Wide-Eyed Wonder, in 1989. When Spurs quit the band during the recording sessions for 1990's Circle Slide, Sauerbrey returned for the remainder of those sessions, and toured with the Choir for two more years. Chandler then rejoined the lineup for the recording of Kissers and Killers, which was later independently released in 1993. Sauerbrey would not play with the band again; Spurs would rejoin the Choir briefly in 2017, when she performed on the Wide-Eyed Wonder reunion tour.

In the 1980s and early 1990s, the Choir toured extensively within the United States, and was most notably the first band on stage at the inaugural Cornerstone Festival in Chicago in 1984. They also preceded Bruce Cockburn on stage at the Greenbelt Festival in England in 1986, and opened for Russ Taff on his nationwide tour in 1990. References to the band's tour experiences would remain an ongoing source of lyrical inspiration. During their Southern California period, the Choir's music was described by the Los Angeles Times as "magical songs that combine strains of murky psychedelia with pure pop." Billboard praised the band for its "dark poetic leanings, effects-laden guitars and strong melodic hooks." Hindalong's lyrics became known for their vulnerability and honesty, particularly about the challenges inherent in romantic relationships and the simple joys of family life.

=== Initial Nashville period (1994–2000) ===
With much of the contemporary Christian music, or CCM, industry centered in Nashville, Tennessee, the band opted to make a permanent move there. Daugherty and Hindalong were both married with children, and the Christian alternative music scene in Southern California was no longer as active as it was in its mid-‘80s heyday. By contrast, the CCM industry had begun flourishing in Nashville in the early 1990s. Soon after the band's arrival, Michaels went into artist management, becoming a successful A&R man in the Christian music industry, eventually serving as the Choir's manager as well. Daugherty and Hindalong would musically contribute to, and produce, numerous projects, including the Lost Dogs, and most notably, the City on a Hill worship music series.

The Choir's first release after arriving in Nashville was Speckled Bird, a reworked version of 1993's independent Kissers and Killers, with five additional songs recorded in Nashville. Their next album, Free Flying Soul, released in 1996, would bring the band their most notable industry recognition to that point, as they were awarded a GMA Dove Award for Alternative/Modern Rock Album of the Year. Five years later, the Choir received a nomination for Best Rock Gospel Album at the 44th Annual Grammy Awards for their album, Flap Your Wings, released in 2000. The album's closing song, "Beautiful Scandalous Night," would subsequently be listed at #100 in the 2006 book CCM Magazine Presents: CCM Top 100 Greatest Songs in Christian Music.

=== Journey to independent status (2000-present) ===
==== CCM limitations as precursor (1985-1990) ====
Despite the belated awards attention, both Hindalong and Daugherty have gone on record numerous times over the years about the limitations of the CCM distribution model, the musical and lyrical expectations from record labels, and their rejection of the term "Christian band" to describe the Choir, as the band never fit the "Christian music" mold, according to Hindalong. "You were either one of two things: you were evangelization or edification,” he explained. “You're either edifying the Body, or getting people saved—one of these two functions. To us, music is not a means to an end. It's not a tool. We're not going to meet your expectations.”

Instead, the band soon realized they were primarily interested in writing music about their everyday life experience, inspired by the music of bands such as Romeo Void, the Church, and My Bloody Valentine. As a result, "we couldn't be sold," Hindalong said. "Whoever promoted the show was not happy with what we did." Daugherty was more measured in his assessment. "In the early days, we did have some promoters that really liked us," he clarified. "They just couldn't make any money off of us. If they can't make a living promoting our show, then they're not going to book us.” This led to the band traveling extensively outside of Southern California, playing anywhere they could be booked, whether a bar, a club, a high school auditorium, a coffeehouse, or a state fairground.

Even when the Choir directly addressed matters of faith in their lyrics, the band's music rarely gained airplay on mainstream Christian radio. Instead, their music was limited to the small number of Christian radio shows that played a mix of alternative, rock and metal music for only a few hours a week, often after midnight. "How would you care about radio success on a radio station that you, yourself, would not listen to?" Hindalong asked. "We had no chance succeeding commercially, plus we didn't want to say what we were expected to say, at least at that point."

In an attempt to broaden the Choir's appeal to Christian audiences, Myrrh had the band open for Russ Taff on his high-profile The Way Home tour in 1990. “It was a disaster," Hindalong said. "The audience overwhelmingly hated us. You could feel the disdain, you know?" Daugherty agreed, and added that, "people would come out and lecture us at our merchandise booth: 'We didn't preach enough.' There would be a couple of nights where people would get up and literally take their youth group out." At the end of the tour, the Choir announced that this would be their last time opening for a mainstream CCM artist. This negative experience coupled with the Choir's continued dissatisfaction with the CCM industry in which their music could only get limited exposure led band manager Paul Emery to issue a press release saying, "The band has grown frustrated with the constraints of a marketplace that values spiritual slogans over musical creativity."

==== Targeting the mainstream (1992-1993) ====
The Choir then made a concerted effort to target a broader audience by recording a collection of demos that they could shop around to mainstream record labels. After a year and a half of playing clubs—including famous venues like the Troubadour in West Hollywood and CBGB in New York City—the Choir considered changing their name to Kissers and Killers. Although three labels expressed interest (I.R.S. Records, Geffen Records and Fiction Records), they ultimately passed. "We really believed we had to take that chance,” Hindalong said. “Besides, I just wanted to hear my songs on the radio." Hindalong denied that the band "hated Christian music and would never do it again," and added, "we're not bitter and frustrated; we're just trying to broaden our audience."

==== Going fully independent (2000) ====
Starting with Flap Your Wings in 2000, the Choir chose to release their music independently on a permanent basis, with the band's following three studio albums also financed by Michaels. Flap Your Wings was strategically released just one day before the Choir performed live at the 2000 Cornerstone Festival, and this served as a launching pad for the new release and the band's new status. In addition, the Choir recorded two new live albums at the festival, Live at Cornerstone 2000: Plugged and Live at Cornerstone 2000: Unplugged, with the former featuring the entire band and the latter an acoustic set with just Daugherty and Hindalong. Michaels then created an official website for the Choir, where they could directly interact with fans as well as sell music and merchandise. This site was launched at the very time that the internet was becoming a new paradigm for independent artists, as a band with an established fanbase like the Choir no longer needed to tour relentlessly to keep listeners eager for new music. Although members of the Choir would continue to provide production and musical contributions to artists within the CCM industry, and the band would occasionally address Christian themes in their music, the Choir would be frequently identified as an indie rock band from that point forward.

In 2005, after Daugherty and Hindalong had worked with Byrd on a number of other musical projects following the release of Flap Your Wings, the Choir officially added Byrd to their lineup to record O How the Mighty Have Fallen. The album was also produced by Byrd, and released through Michaels' new Galaxy21 imprint, through which all future Choir albums would be distributed. In August of that same year, this new five-member Choir played the Broken Records Reunion, a 20th anniversary concert at Mariners Church in Irvine, California, along with 4-4-1, Altar Boys, Crumbächer, and Undercover.

==== Renewed creative activity (2010) ====
After a five-year recording hiatus, the Choir released two full-length studio albums in 2010. In June, the band released Burning Like the Midnight Sun, which received positive reviews. Jeff Elbel in the Chicago Sun-Times called the album "a late-career triumph," and remarked that it was the band's "second exceptional album in a row, and its best since 1990's landmark Circle Slide." In November, the band released de-plumed, which featured cellist Matt Slocum of Sixpence None the Richer. A collection of acoustic reinterpretations of one song from each of their 12 prior studio albums, it was released shortly after Daugherty and Hindalong embarked on a multi-city acoustic tour as a duo version of the band.

The Choir's next studio album, The Loudest Sound Ever Heard, was released in May 2012. Later that year, the band toured in celebration of the 25th anniversary of Chase the Kangaroo, playing the album in its entirety, followed by a selection of tracks from Loudest Sound. For this tour, the band performed as a trio with bassist Chandler. Then in July, the full lineup of the Choir closed out the final gathering of the Cornerstone Festival, in commemoration of their inaugural 1984 performance.

==== Shift to crowdfunding (2013) ====
From this point forward, the Choir would use Kickstarter and PledgeMusic as their primary ways of recording and releasing new studio albums, re-releases of older studio albums, and solo work by Hindalong and Daugherty. To date, this funding process has generated four studio albums: Shadow Weaver (2014), Bloodshot (2018), Deep Cuts (2021) and Dragonfly (2026). Kickstarter stretch goals have contributed seven additional releases: the Christmas-themed Peace, Love & Light EP (2013), the live albums Live and on the Wing in Music City (2014) and The Livestream Bootleg (2015), the "unplugged" Kissers and Killers — The Acoustic Sessions (2018), the ambient Words Spoken and Floating on Clouds (2023), 7 + 77s = 9: Reinterpretations (2024)—which features newly-recorded versions of earlier work, including a cover version performed by the 77s— and Benchwarmers, ten updated and re-recorded versions of tracks originally provided to Patreon subscribers. Since 2013, the band has remastered and re-released Chase the Kangaroo, Kissers and Killers, Free Flying Soul, Flap Your Wings, Circle Slide and Wide-Eyed Wonder, following the latter two re-releases with a short tour during which the entire album was played in its entirety. Michael Roe of the 77s filled in on bass for the Circle Slide 25th anniversary tour in 2015, while former bassist Spurs returned to the band to perform on the Wide-Eyed Wonder anniversary tour in 2017. Crowdfunding also generated Hindalong's second solo album The Warbler in 2016, and Daugherty's third solo release The Color of Dreams in 2018 on Lo-Fidelity Records.

==== Post-Tim Chandler work (2019-present) ====
Long-time bassist Chandler died on October 8, 2018. The following year, the Choir—now a threesome—began releasing non-album singles at the pace of one every other month, starting with a cover of Phil Collins' "In the Air Tonight" and followed by "Mystical World," their first original composition after Chandler's death. In March 2021, the Choir shifted to Patreon where they continue to release new tracks exclusively for subscribers, including a 2021 re-recording of "Render Love" for the Electric Jesus film soundtrack. Deep Cuts, also released in 2021, was the band's first studio album without contributions from Chandler, as bass duties were primarily helmed by session musician Chris Donohue, with two tracks featuring bassist Stephen Mason from Jars of Clay. Donohue also played with the Choir on two new tracks recorded for other projects: "The First Time I Saw Eden," a cover of a Randy Stonehill song for the 2022 tribute album There's A Rainbow Somewhere: The Songs of Randy Stonehill, and "Old Man Winter," for A Mercyland Christmas, part of the multi-artist Mercyland series of albums led by Phil Madeira.

Since Chandler's death, the Choir has not headlined a tour for any of their successive albums. However, the band performed as the opening act for the Prayer Chain's brief tour in 2018 which promoted the 25th anniversary re-release of their debut album Shawl, produced by Hindalong. In 2024, the Choir performed at the AudioFeed festival in Urbana, Illinois, and in 2026, opened for Sixpence None the Richer in San Antonio, Texas and Roswell, New Mexico. The latter two shows included Matt Slocum on guitar and Justin Cary on bass.

In 2024, the Choir released a significant amount of new material. In addition to the band's monthly releases to Patreon subscribers, they also released three new studio albums, one EP and one live album. The first of these was the Kickstarter bonus album 7 + 77s = 9: Reinterpretations, which was a result of a stretch goal for the second re-release of Chase the Kangaroo. The second studio album, Patreon Sessions (Unfinished Tracks), was a compilation of 12 singles from Patreon made available to non-subscribers. The third and most notable was Translucent, which was the Choir's first ambient instrumental release. The sole EP, Reinterpretations, was simply an abridged version of 7 + 77s = 9: Reinterpretations released to streaming platforms. Finally, the band released Live from District Drugs, an acoustic performance originally recorded in Rock Island, Illinois in 2012. Both 7 + 77s = 9: Reinterpretations and Translucent received a physical release; the remainder of their 2024 releases were digital-only.

In October 2025, it was announced that the band was working on a 20-song double album entitled Dragonfly, their "most ambitious to date"; it was released in September 2026. In May 2026, a biographical timeline and oral history entitled The Choir Timeline, Volume One was published through Amazon. The book chronicles the first part of the band's career through 1996, via stories, photos, interviews, concert dates and set lists. On October 6, 2026, The Choir Timeline Volume Two was released on Amazon, which continues the oral history of the band detailing the bands career through the years of 1997 to 2026.

== Other projects ==
=== Solo works and collaborations ===
Each band member has worked on numerous projects outside the Choir. Daugherty, Hindalong and Michaels have all released solo works, with Daugherty also releasing an instrumental ambient project under the name Clouds Echo in Blue in 2011. Daugherty is also one-half of Kerosene Halo, a duo project with 77s frontman Roe; they have released three albums to date. Since 1991, Daugherty has also been a member of the alternative rock supergroup Lost Dogs, led by Terry Scott Taylor of Daniel Amos and including the 77s' Roe and Adam Again's Eugene; Hindalong would join the group after Eugene's death. In 2023, Hindalong would also join with Slocum, Madeira, Jimmy Abegg and Ben Pearson to form The Ascendants and use Kickstarter to launch their debut album, The Fellowship of the Broken. The following year, Hindalong performed live with Sixpence None the Richer, providing percussion on the band's We Are Love tour to support their Rosemary Hill EP, which Hindalong produced. In 2024, Hindalong joined with Dan Haseltine, Billy Smiley, Ron Hemby and Matt Nelson to form The River Cryers, and they released two singles to streaming music and social media platforms: "Cry Me a River" and "Lost Art of Losing." In 2026, they used Kickstarter to fund their self-titled debut.

Before his death in 2018, Chandler was the bass player for both Daniel Amos and that band's side project, the Swirling Eddies, for many years, pre-dating his work with the Choir. Spurs later joined Rachel Rachel and toured with them in the early 1990s. Byrd was a member of Common Children, then later he and bandmate Andrew Thompson formed the post-rock band Hammock in 2005. Byrd has also recorded with his wife Christine Glass as Glassbyrd. Michaels has recorded saxophone for, and performed on tour with, a variety of other artists including Adam Again, Dighayzoose, Crystal Lewis and Bryan Duncan.

=== Worship albums ===
Daugherty and Hindalong have produced and recorded several worship albums featuring other CCM artists, including their own At the Foot of the Cross series. Volume One: Clouds, Rain, Fire was released in 1992, and the song "Beautiful Scandalous Night" would later be re-recorded by the Choir eight years later for their Grammy-nominated Flap Your Wings album. The follow-up, Volume Two: Seven Last Words of Christ, was released in 1995, along with a sacred Christmas album, Noel. Hindalong would then go on to produce the aforementioned City on a Hill series of worship albums in the early 2000s. The lead single from the initial album, Songs of Worship and Praise, was "God of Wonders," co-written by Hindalong and Marc Byrd; it held the #1 spot on the Christian adult contemporary charts for several weeks, became one of the most successful worship songs of the early 2000s, and was later listed at #11 in the 2006 book CCM Magazine Presents: CCM Top 100 Greatest Songs in Christian Music. Songs of Worship and Praise would go on to receive a GMA Dove Award in 2001 for Special Event Album of the Year.

== Personnel ==
Current members

- Derri Daugherty – lead vocals, guitars
- Steve Hindalong – drums, percussion, vocals
- Dan Michaels – saxophone, lyricon

Former members

- Tim Chandler – bass guitar, vocals
- Mike Sauerbrey – bass guitar
- Robin Spurs – bass guitar, vocals
- Marc Byrd – guitars, vocals

Touring musicians

- Billy Wilde (nee Bill Sammons) – guitar
- Bill Campbell – guitar
- Wayne Everett – percussion
- Michael Roe – bass guitar, vocals
- Matt Slocum – guitar
- Justin Cary – bass guitar

Timeline

== Discography ==
=== Studio albums ===
- 1985 Voices in Shadows (as Youth Choir)
- 1986 Diamonds and Rain
- 1988 Chase the Kangaroo
- 1989 Wide-Eyed Wonder
- 1990 Circle Slide
- 1993 Kissers and Killers
- 1994 Speckled Bird
- 1996 Free Flying Soul
- 2000 Flap Your Wings
- 2005 O How the Mighty Have Fallen
- 2010 Burning Like the Midnight Sun
- 2010 de-plumed
- 2012 The Loudest Sound Ever Heard
- 2014 Shadow Weaver
- 2018 Bloodshot
- 2021 Deep Cuts
- 2024 Translucent
- 2026 Dragonfly

=== Crowdfunded bonus studio albums ===
- 2018 Kissers and Killers — The Acoustic Sessions
- 2023 Words Spoken and Floating on Clouds
- 2024 7 + 77s = 9: Reinterpretations
- 2024 Patreon Sessions (Unfinished Tracks)
- 2026 Benchwarmers

=== EPs ===
- 1986 Shades of Gray (as Youth Choir)
- 2013 Peace, Love & Light
- 2024 Reinterpretations

=== Live albums ===
- 1997 Let It Fly
- 2000 Live at Cornerstone 2000: Plugged
- 2000 Live at Cornerstone 2000: Unplugged
- 2014 Live and on the Wing in Music City
- 2015 The Livestream Bootleg
- 2024 Live From District Drugs
- 2025 Live Fall Tour 2011 (with Kerosene Halo)
- 2025 Live & A Little Rough: Knott's Berry Farm 1992

=== Compilations ===
- 1995 Love Songs and Prayers: A Retrospective
- 2001 Never Say Never: The First 20 Years (8-CD box set of first nine studio releases + unreleased tracks)

=== Promotional singles ===
Year	Single	Peak chart positions			Album
Year	Single	CCM Rock	CCM CHR	CCM AC	Album
1985	"A Million Years"	—	—	—	Voices in Shadows
1985	"Someone's Calling"	8	—	—	Voices in Shadows
1986
1986	"15 Doors"	5	—	—	Shades of Gray
1986	"Fear Only You"	1	17	—	Diamonds and Rain
1986	"When the Morning Comes"	—	7	11	Diamonds and Rain
1987					Diamonds and Rain
1987	"Kingston Road"	—	—	—	Diamonds and Rain
1987	"Render Love"	6	—	—	Diamonds and Rain
1988	"Clouds"	—	—	—	Chase the Kangaroo
1988	"Consider"	1	—	—	Chase the Kangaroo
1988	"Chase the Kangaroo"	7	—	—	Chase the Kangaroo
1989	"Someone to Hold On To"	1	12	—	Wide-Eyed Wonder
1989	"Wide-Eyed Wonder"	—	10	—	Wide-Eyed Wonder
1989	"To Cover You"	5	—	—	Wide-Eyed Wonder
1990	"Spin You Around"	12	—	—	Wide-Eyed Wonder
1990	"Restore My Soul"	3	—	—	Circle Slide
1991	"About Love"	6	25	—	Circle Slide
1994	"Spring"	2	—	—	Speckled Bird
1994	"Speckled Bird"	7	—	—	Speckled Bird
1996	"The Ocean"	—	20	—	Free Flying Soul
1996	"Away With the Swine"	6	—	—	Free Flying Soul
1996	"Sled Dog"	8	—	—	Free Flying Soul
2000	"Hey Gene"	9	—	—	Flap Your Wings
2001	"Cherry Bomb"	—	—	—	Flap Your Wings
"—" denotes singles that did not chart.

=== Non-album tracks ===
==== Vinyl singles ====
- 1984 "I Can't Take It (Live)" b/w "Here in the Night (Live)" (as Youth Choir)
- 2024 "Nowhere Else" (The Choir) b/w "To Cover You" (The 77s)

==== Digital singles ====
- 2004 "Travelin' Light (demo)" (music download)
- 2006 "The Sun Also Rises (demo)" (streaming)
- 2010 "Babe in the Straw" (music download)
- 2012 "Shadow of the Cross" (music download)
- 2013 "Beautiful Girl" (music download)
- 2016 "Rhythm of the Road (Reimagined)" (music download)
- 2019 "In the Air Tonight" (music download)
- 2019 "After All (Reimagined) [featuring Leigh Nash]" (music download)
- 2019 "Mystical World" (music download)
- 2019 "Kathie's Garden" (music download)
- 2019 "Counting Stars" (music download)
- 2020 "What You Think I Am (Reimagined) [featuring Leigh Nash]" (music download)
- 2020 "The Real WWW" (music download)

==== Patreon-exclusive music downloads ====
All songs initially released on a monthly basis to Patreon supporters only. In 2023, the Choir began slowly releasing some of these tracks one at a time under the banner The Patreon Sessions, either by digital download or on streaming platforms. These same tracks were later collected together for the 2024 digital release Patreon Sessions (Unfinished Tracks). Songs made available outside of Patreon are indicated.

- 2021 "Render Love (2021 Version)"
- 2021 "Alone" [The Patreon Sessions music download; streaming]
- 2021 "My Father's Son"
- 2021 "One Man Band" (feat. Steve Hindalong)
- 2021 "Let It Ride" [The Patreon Sessions music download; streaming]
- 2021 "Wings on Fire"
- 2021 "Angry World" [The Patreon Sessions music download; streaming]
- 2021 "Old Man Winter"
- 2022 "Just Who" [The Patreon Sessions music download; streaming]
- 2022 "Billy Wilde"
- 2022 "Talk It Out" [The Patreon Sessions music download; streaming]
- 2022 "Something in the Way She Moves"
- 2022 "Mr. Chandler (Spoken Word)" (feat. Steve Hindalong)
- 2022 "I Don't Want to Cry" [The Patreon Sessions music download; streaming]
- 2022 "Centrifugal" [The Patreon Sessions music download; streaming]
- 2022 "Sentimental Song (Reimagined)" [Facebook]
- 2022 "Snow Angels and Holiday Prayers" [Music download; streaming]
- 2022 "Be My Girl" [The Patreon Sessions music download; streaming]
- 2022 "The Time Has Come (Spoken Word)" (feat. Steve Hindalong)
- 2022 "We Drive On" [The Patreon Sessions music download; streaming]
- 2022 "Mind Your Ways"
- 2022 "Summon Your Soul" [The Patreon Sessions music download; streaming]
- 2022 "A Matter of Degrees"
- 2023 "Heaven" [The Patreon Sessions music download; streaming]
- 2023 "Divine Intervention"
- 2023 "More Than Words (2023 Version)"
- 2023 "Let It Burn"
- 2023 "Reach for the Sky" (feat. Steve Hindalong)
- 2023 "Chase the Kangaroo (Reimagined)"
- 2023 "I Can't Rescue You"
- 2023 "Sylvia's Mother"
- 2023 "Your Chair (Live Bootleg)" (Derri Daugherty solo track)
- 2023 "May the Buffalo Roam" (Steve Hindalong solo track)
- 2023 "Jinglin' on My Mind" (feat. Steve Hindalong)
- 2024 "What Goes Around"
- 2024 "It's Good To Be Alive"
- 2024 "God in Me"
- 2024 "River Bend" (feat. Steve Hindalong)
- 2024 "Sometimes It's Hope"
- 2024 "The Ocean (Reimagined)" [The Patreon Sessions music download; streaming]
- 2024 "Old Timer"
- 2024 "Sweet Time" (feat. Steve Hindalong)
- 2024 "Dr. Who"
- 2024 "Circle Slide (Live at Knott's Berry Farm 1992)"
- 2024 "Thrill Ride"
- 2024 A Brief History EP
  - "Clouds (Live Acoustic)"
  - "Midnight Sun (Live Acoustic)"
  - "Sentimental Song (Live Acoustic)"
  - "The Forest (Live Acoustic)"
  - "To Cover You (Live Acoustic)"
- 2024 "Come Healing" (with Kerosene Halo)
- 2024 "The Parting Glass" [Facebook]
- 2024 "Blue Skies (Live at Knott's Berry Farm 1992)"
- 2025 "Snake Hook" (feat. Steve Hindalong)
- 2025 "Somewhere Behind Her Eyes"
- 2025 "The Greening"
- 2025 "Adjacent Zones"
- 2025 "The Moon's Reflection" (Derri Daugherty solo track)
- 2025 "Whatever Train" (feat. Steve Hindalong)
- 2025 "Midnight Sun (Live Studio Version)"
- 2025 "You Bring the Fire Down"
- 2025 "Mercy Lives Here (Chill Mix)" [YouTube]
- 2025 "The Darkness (Demo Version)" (feat. Steve Hindalong)
- 2025 "You Belong"
- 2025 "Silent Night" [Facebook]
- 2026 "Better Man" (Derri Daugherty solo track)
- 2026 "Blame (Acoustic Version)"
- 2026 "What You Think I Am (Kirby Groves Remix)"
- 2026 "Still Here, Still There (Demo Version)" (feat. Steve Hindalong)
- 2026 "Still Here, Still There (Final Version)"
- 2026 "Robin Had a Dream (Live in San Antonio 2026)"
- 2026 "Yellow Skies (Live in San Antonio 2026)"
- 2026 "I Miss Your Face"
- 2026 "Time"

=== Appearances on other works ===
- 1983 What's Shakin' ["It's So Wonderful"] (as Youth Choir)
- 1985 Broken Samples ["Here in the Night"] (as Youth Choir)
- 1989 The Myrrh Radio Collection, Volume 1 ["Someone to Hold On To"]
- 1993 Brow Beat: Unplugged Alternative ["Wilderness (Acoustic version)"]
- 1993 Third Wave ["Kissers and Killers"]
- 1994 Can You Dig It? ["Kissers and Killers"]
- 1994 Strong Hand of Love: A Tribute to Mark Heard ["Tip of My Tongue"]
- 1995 Contemporary Adult Music for the 90's ["Wilderness"]
- 1996 Orphans of God ["Tip of My Tongue"]
- 1996 Seltzer: Modern Rock to Settle Your Soul ["The Ocean"]
- 1998 GAS Collection CD, Volume 5 ["Yellow Skies (Live)"]
- 1998 Grab Bag Candy Sampler, Volume 1 ["Flowing Over Me (Demo version)"]
- 2003 Contemporary Christian Hits: A Collage ["Grace"]
- 2022 There's a Rainbow Somewhere: The Songs of Randy Stonehill ["The Last Time I Saw Eden"]
- 2023 A Mercyland Christmas ["Old Man Winter"]

=== Video releases ===
- 1989 Wide-Eyed Wonder Videos (VHS: music videos for "Someone To Hold On To" and "Robin Had a Dream"; 32-minute band documentary)
- 1996 "Sled Dog" music video (Enhanced CD: included with bonus content on Let It Fly)
- 1996 Tattoo Video Hoopla (VHS: live performance from Cornerstone '96)
- 2016 Live and on the Wing in Music City (DVD: 2014 live performance included in CD/DVD combo)

=== Solo releases by members of the Choir ===
- 1991 Reveal [EP] – Dan Michaels
- 1998 Skinny – Steve Hindalong
- 2002 A Few Unfinished Songs [EP] – Derri Daugherty
  - 2015 A Few Unfinished Songs (Deluxe) (re-release with six additional tracks)
- 2003 Open Wide This Window – Glassbyrd (Marc Byrd and Christine Glass)
- 2010 "I Still Believe" [Single] – Derri Daugherty
- 2011 Clouds Echo in Blue – Clouds Echo in Blue (Derri Daugherty)
- 2015 "Child in the Manger" [Single] – Derri Daugherty
- 2016 The Warbler – Steve Hindalong
- 2016 Hush Sorrow – Derri Daugherty
- 2018 The Color of Dreams – Derri Daugherty

== Awards and nominations ==
Year	Awards	Work	Category	Result	Ref.
1990	21st GMA Dove Awards	Wide-Eyed Wonder Videos	Best Long Form Video	Nominated	
1996	28th GMA Dove Awards	Free Flying Soul	Best Modern Rock/Alternative Album	Won	
2002	44th Annual Grammy Awards	Flap Your Wings	Best Rock Gospel Album	Nominated	
