= Flap Your Wings (album) =

Studio album by The Choir
- Released: July 4, 2000
- Recorded: 1999, 2000
- Studios: Neverland Studios, Berry Hill, Tennessee; Earful, Franklin, Tennessee; Dark Horse Recording, Franklin, Tennessee; The Mission, Ashland City, Tennessee; Spooky’s Lair, Brentwood, Tennessee; Yackland, Nashville, Tennessee
- Genres: Alternative rock; Christian alternative rock
- Length: 39:57
- Labels: TheChoir.net Records (2000); Galaxy21 (2026)
- Producers: Derri Daugherty; Steve Hindalong; Tim Chandler

The Choir chronology
Let It Fly (1997)	Flap Your Wings (2000)	Live at Cornerstone 2000: Plugged (2000)

The Choir studio albums chronology
Free Flying Soul (1996)	Flap Your Wings (2000)	O How the Mighty Have Fallen (2005)

Alternative cover
- The 25th Anniversary Deluxe Edition.

Singles from Flap Your Wings
- 1. "Hey Gene" Released: October 2, 2000; 2. "Cherry Bomb" Released: April 27, 2001

Flap Your Wings is the tenth studio release, and ninth full-length studio album, by alternative rock band the Choir, released in 2000. It earned the band its first Grammy Award nomination. The album's closing song, "Beautiful Scandalous Night," was listed at #100 in the 2006 book CCM Magazine Presents: CCM Top 100 Greatest Songs in Christian Music.

== Background ==
After the band's "To Bid Farewell" tour documented by the live album Let It Fly, the members of the Choir moved onto other projects. Lead singer and guitarist Derri Daugherty and drummer and lyricist Steve Hindalong began working with a variety of other contemporary Christian artists such as Common Children, White Heart, Phil Madeira, Julie Miller and the Newsboys, in either production or musical capacities. Hindalong also released his first solo album, Skinny, in 1997. Daugherty continued his side gig with the Lost Dogs, which released two albums during this period, The Green Room Serenade, Part One and Gift Horse. Bass guitarist Tim Chandler went back to work with Terry Taylor on his solo, Daniel Amos and Swirling Eddies projects, while sax and Lyricon player Dan Michaels continued in artist management at Benson Records.

Hindalong and Daugherty had their greatest success with the City on a Hill worship music series, released in mid-2000. The lead single from the initial album, Songs of Worship and Praise, was "God of Wonders," co-written by Hindalong and Marc Byrd; it held the #1 spot on the Christian adult contemporary charts for several weeks, became one of the most successful worship songs of the early 2000s, and was later listed at #11 in the 2006 book CCM Magazine Presents: CCM Top 100 Greatest Songs in Christian Music. Songs of Worship and Praise would later receive a Dove Award in 2001 for Special Event Album of the Year.

During this hiatus for the Choir, Michaels decided to create an official website for the band, where they could directly interact with fans as well as sell music and merchandise. This site was launched at the very time that the internet was becoming a new paradigm for indie rock artists, as a band with an established fanbase like the Choir no longer needed to tour relentlessly to keep listeners eager for new music. However, it was a one-off concert at a music festival in Albuquerque, New Mexico during the summer of 1999 that finally convinced the members of the Choir to work on new music together.

== Recording and production ==
On Thanksgiving weekend of 1999, Chandler flew out to Nashville, Tennessee for a writing and recording session, and the result was five new songs. In May 2000, Chandler returned to Nashville, and the band wrote an additional five songs. The Choir suddenly had an album's worth of new material.

This second recording session took place mere weeks after the passing of Gene Eugene, lead singer and songwriter for Adam Again, who had been found dead on the floor of his recording studio, The Green Room, in Huntington Beach, California. Eugene, a prolific producer and engineer, was a close personal friend of the band—Michaels in particular—and had worked on a number of their releases. At only 38 years old, Eugene's death was a shock, and as a result, the song "Hey Gene" was created in response, incorporating lines from Michaels' eulogy at the funeral.

"Mercy Lives Here" was the first time since Voices in Shadows that Daugherty wrote the lyrics as well as the music to a Choir song. Originally intended for a solo album, the song was inspired by his visit to a bar in Akron, Ohio filled with a strange assortment of characters. The album's closing song, "Beautiful Scandalous Night," was a re-recording of the same song from the worship record At the Foot of the Cross, Volume One: Clouds, Rain, Fire from 1992.

== Artwork and packaging ==
The cover painting for Flap Your Wings, described by one critic as "equal parts representation and abstraction," was done by Michael Knott, the frontman for Lifesavers Underground and the co-founder of Blonde Vinyl Records. Knott continued to create art and sell his work online until his death on March 12, 2024.

== Release ==
Flap Your Wings was strategically released just one day before the band performed live at the 2000 Cornerstone Festival, which served as a launching pad for the new release. The album was released on CD only, and independently, as Galaxy21 Music—which would release future Choir albums—had not yet been founded. Because the band viewed the new album as a response to their most avid fans, only 8,000 copies were manufactured. "Hey Gene" was released as the first single from the album, and peaked at #9 on the CCM Rock chart. The following year, "Cherry Bomb" was the second single issued from the album, but it did not chart.

Given the album's independent status and limited release, the members of the Choir were surprised to learn that Flap Your Wings was nominated in the Best Rock Gospel Album category for the 44th Annual Grammy Awards, which were held in 2002. Although placing first in an online poll conducted by Christianity Today as to which artist deserved to win the Grammy that year, DC Talk took home the award for the album Solo.

=== 25th anniversary remaster (2026) ===
As part of the successful 2025 Kickstarter campaign for Dragonfly, Flap Your Wings was reissued on CD and LP in September 2026 as a 25th Anniversary Deluxe Edition, this time fully remastered. This was also the album's first vinyl release, which came in a blue "splatter" color. Both formats included two newly-recorded cover versions of songs the Choir selected from their musical contemporaries: "Blame" by L.S.U. and "Dig" by Adam Again, both of which featured guest vocals from Adam Again member Riki Michele.

== Critical reception ==
Professional ratings
Review scores
Source	Rating
CCM Magazine	Favorable
Cross Rhythms	10/10 stars
The Phantom Tollbooth	4/5 stars
The Phantom Tollbooth	5/5 stars
The Phantom Tollbooth	4/5 stars

Critical reaction at the time was positive. Writing in CCM Magazine, critic Dave Urbanski said that Flap Your Wings was a "decidedly delicate mix of the band's best musical elements from its '90s catalog, and although there's not a whole lot new here musically, The Choir does throw in a few pleasant surprises." He called the lead single "Hey Gene" "an energetic pop-rock gem," adding that it was "the most rock oriented tune on the record—and the obvious centerpiece." With the inclusion of the worship song "Beautiful Scandalous Night," Urbanski summed up Flap Your Wings as "a fine record with more than enough shining moments." Cross Rhythms gave the album a perfect ten, with critic Mike Rimmer writing that the album was "classic Choir," with "well-crafted songs and warm production." He added that "Flap Your Wings sees humanity and eternity meeting in a collection of songs that build on the foundation of their best work."

The Phantom Tollbooth was especially effusive, naming Flap Your Wings the August 2000 Pick of the Month, and included three separate reviews. In the lead review, critic Michial Farmer claimed that Flap Your Wings was an "immediate contender for best album of 2000." Although critical of some "missteps" like the drum machine in "Flowing Over Me" and the re-recording of "Beautiful Scandalous Night" not "[reaching] the magnitude of the original," he praised "Mercy Lives Here" for avoiding "the cheesiness and banality typical of modern worship, and [it aims] at the brain as much as the heart." Steven S. Baldwin added that Flap Your Wings was the band's "warmest, most relaxed album to date," with songs that were "bright and beautiful, heartfelt and pure." Terry Wandtke closed out the triple review, saying that "Flap Your Wings continues [the Choir's] general success as artists with integrity and testifies to their continued relevancy in any market."

Retrospectively, Flap Your Wings has also received praise. Mark Allan Powell, writing in the Encyclopedia of Contemporary Christian Music, called the album a "warm, relaxed, and generally gentle record," adding that it "revives their atmospheric tradition, with perhaps a little Radiohead influence showing around the edges." He praised the title track's "profoundly spiritual lyrics," and called "Hey Gene" "the highlight of the album." "As sentimental as any Bob Carlisle song," Powell added, "it recalls the mercy their friend always showed them, sheds a few tears over his absence, and then bids him adieu."

=== Accolades ===
- Christianity Today
  - Readers' Poll: Most Deserving – 2002 Grammy Awards

=== Awards and nominations ===
- 44th Annual Grammy Awards (2002) – Best Rock Gospel Album (nomination)

== Track listing ==
All lyrics by Steve Hindalong and all music by Derri Daugherty, unless otherwise noted.

No.	Title	Lyrics	Music	Length
1.	"Flap Your Wings"		Derri Daugherty, Steve Hindalong	3:15
2.	"Shiny Floor"		Tim Chandler, Hindalong	4:23
3.	"Mercy Lives Here"	Daugherty		3:33
4.	"Hey Gene"	Hindalong, Dan Michaels	Daugherty, Hindalong	4:31
5.	"Sunny"		Chandler	3:39
6.	"Flowing Over Me"			3:52
7.	"Cherry Bomb"			5:12
8.	"I Don't Mean Any Harm"		Chandler, Hindalong	4:47
9.	"A Moment in Time"	Hindalong, Daugherty		2:54
10.	"Beautiful Scandalous Night"			3:51
Total length:				39:57

25th anniversary deluxe edition — Vinyl (Side one)
No.	Title	Lyrics	Music	Length
1.	"Flap Your Wings"		Daugherty, Hindalong	3:16
2.	"Shiny Floor"		Chandler, Hindalong	4:23
3.	"Mercy Lives Here"	Daugherty		3:34
4.	"Hey Gene"	Hindalong, Michaels	Daugherty, Hindalong	4:31
5.	"Dig"	Gene Eugene	Eugene	3:29
6.	"Sunny"		Chandler	3:41

25th anniversary deluxe edition — Vinyl (Side two)
No.	Title	Lyrics	Music	Length
1.	"Flowing Over Me"			3:53
2.	"Cherry Bomb"			5:14
3.	"I Don't Mean Any Harm"		Chandler, Hindalong	4:47
4.	"Blame"	Mike Knott	Knott	3:10
5.	"A Moment in Time"	Hindalong, Daugherty		2:55
6.	"Beautiful Scandalous Night"			3:53
Total length:				46:46

== Personnel ==
Personnel taken from Flap Your Wings liner notes.

The Choir

- Derri Daugherty – lead vocals, guitars, drums, loops, keyboards
- Steve Hindalong – drums, percussion, keyboards, vocals, xylophone
- Tim Chandler – bass guitar, guitar, vocals
- Dan Michaels – saxophone, tenor saxophone

Guest performers

- Julian Kindred – effects, electronics
- Christine Glass – vocals
- Emily Hindalong – trumpet postlude to "Sunny"
- Phil Madeira – Mellotron (flutes, strings), lap steel guitar
- Jacob Lawson – violin
- Riki Michele – vocals ("Dig," "Blame") [2026 remaster]
- Justin Cary – bass guitar ("Dig," "Blame") [2026 remaster]
- Stephen Leiweke – acoustic guitar ("Dig," "Blame") [2026 remaster]

Production

- "Buckeye" Dan Michaels – executive producer
- Derri Daugherty – producer, engineer
- Steve Hindalong – producer
- Tim Chandler – producer
- Julian Kindred – additional production, recording, mixing
- Terry Taylor – additional production
- Stephen Leiweke – mixing ("Dig," "Blame") [2026 remaster]
- Ken Love – mastering (Master Mix)
- Nigel Palmer – mastering (Lowland Masters, Essex UK) [2026 remaster]
- Michael Knott – front cover painting
- Andy Conant – layout, photography, design
- Marc Ludena – layout, design [2026 remaster]
