= Free Flying Soul =

Studio album by The Choir
- Released: March 1, 1996
- Recorded: 1996
- Studios: Neverland Studios, Berry Hill, Tennessee
- Genres: Alternative rock; Christian alternative rock
- Length: 44:37
- Labels: Tattoo (1996); Provident/Sony (2024)
- Producers: Steve Hindalong; Derri Daugherty

The Choir chronology
Love Songs and Prayers: A Retrospective (1995)	Free Flying Soul (1996)	Let It Fly (1997)

The Choir studio albums chronology
Speckled Bird (1994)	Free Flying Soul (1996)	Flap Your Wings (2000)

Alternative cover
- The cassette version.

Singles from Free Flying Soul
- 1. "The Ocean" Released: March 18, 1996; 2. "Away with the Swine" Released: March 25, 1996; 3. "Sled Dog" Released: July 29, 1996

Free Flying Soul is the ninth studio release, and eighth full-length album, from alternative rock band the Choir, released in 1996. It earned the band its first industry recognition with a GMA Dove Award win.

== Background ==
After the release of Speckled Bird, lead singer and guitarist Derri Daugherty and drummer and lyricist Steve Hindalong regrouped to work on their second worship album, At the Foot of the Cross, Volume Two: Seven Last Words of Christ. Unlike Volume One, which was released on the band's Glasshouse Records label, then sold poorly and quickly went out of print, Volume Two would get a larger release on Myrrh Records, with greater label support, including a radio special. The album included more high-profile contemporary Christian and black gospel artists including Bryan Duncan, Babbie Mason, Charlie Peacock, Anointed, Brent Bourgeois (from Bourgeois Tagg) and Marty McCall (from First Call). Daugherty and Hindalong then followed up with the Christmas-themed Noel, another multi-artist effort which included Kevin Max (from DC Talk), Buddy and Julie Miller, Riki Michele (from Adam Again) and Michael Pritzl (from the Violet Burning).

After the Choir's one-off deal with R.E.X. Records for the release of Speckled Bird, Daugherty and Hindalong signed a new publishing deal with Benson Records. Because Benson was looking to expand their roster of alternative rock artists, they hired saxophone and Lyricon player Dan Michaels—who had gained plenty of marketing and A&R experience running the Glasshouse label—to lead the new Tattoo Records imprint. To successfully launch the new label, it made sense that the first release should be from an established artist. As a result, the Choir went to work on their next album, which would turn out to be their last for a Christian record company.

== Recording and production ==
Free Flying Soul was recorded in a scant six weeks. According to Hindalong, Free Flying Soul would be the last Choir album to be a fully analog recording. The band's primary equipment included a Neve console previously used by the John Peel Sessions—which later ended up at Ocean Way Recording—as well as a Studer two-inch tape recorder. According to Hindalong, the loose recording style gave a "drunken feel" to the album, as "Derri and I just looked at each other and played," as opposed to the more "locked in" nature of digital recording with ProTools, which is standard practice for modern productions. However, the excessive use of a de-esser during final mixing made Daugherty sound like he was lisping, and he and Hindalong were furious that the effect was only slightly turned down but never removed entirely.

The Choir's bass guitarist Tim Chandler had remained in California after the remaining three members of the band had moved to Nashville, so he was flown out for a three-week recording session. The balance of recording was then completed with Wayne Everett in an attempt to "rough up" and "ruin things a bit." Other contributors to the album included singer Jenny Gullen and drummer Scotty Pearson from the band Hoi Polloi, as Hindalong had produced their 1995 album Happy Ever After. Guitarist Chrissy Colbert from Breakfast with Amy also provided bass treatments on one track.

== Composition ==
=== Music ===
As Hindalong only had lyrics for "Polar Boy" and "The Chicken" going into the studio, he initially thought that it would result in a record that reflected a much darker mood. However, Daugherty was in a very positive place after the recent birth of his daughter, so his contributions were "warm, whimsical chord progressions." Because of this, the tone of the album turned out much more upbeat than the band's recent work, more in keeping with 1989's Wide-Eyed Wonder.

The Choir "did things a lot more reckless" musically with this album, which included influences from Teenage Fanclub, The Jesus and Mary Chain and Mick Fleetwood. Hindalong sang lead on a Christian label release for the first time since Chase the Kangaroo, with distorted vocals on "Slow Spin." Daugherty used unusual open tuning on "Butterfly," which made it very challenging to perform live; however, his work on the final track, "The Warbler," Hindalong considers to be "the finest guitar treatment Derri has given a song." The long instrumental coda to "Polar Boy" happened spontaneously during recording, and Hindalong used hard mallets to create a "dark" sound to the cymbals on that track. Chandler, who normally just played bass, performed the strange-sounding guitars at the end of "The Chicken," which was his take on the melody from the hymn "Love Lifted Me." Daugherty recorded his guitar line backwards for "If You're Listening," and to create that song's fuzzed-out bass sound, Colbert sat on the studio floor operating a Sovtek fuzz pedal as Chandler played. "A beautiful song like this, Tim would want to sonically ruin it if he could," Hindalong said. "That was always the objective. And Colbert was of the same mindset, which created a great deal of wonderful tension and served the lyric really well."

=== Lyrics ===
Hindalong used a large amount of animal imagery in the lyrics for this album, which was reflected in most of the titles ("Salamander," "Sled Dog," "Away with the Swine," "Butterfly," "The Chicken," "The Warbler," "Yellow-Haired Monkeys"). "One led to the other, and it started being fun," Hindalong said. This development was inspired by his repeated visits to a local Nashville store called Wild Animals, which sold animal-focused statuaries and other art objects. Hindalong purchased a number of them with money from the recording budget, and "they all ended up as part of the imagery on the album." Even so, the lyrics were still inspired by events in Hindalong's life, as was standard practice for Choir albums. "Yellow-Haired Monkeys" addressed both Daugherty's and Hindalong's young children playing in Hindalong's back yard, as all their children had blonde hair at that time. "Leprechaun" referenced a "leprechaun dance" that Hindalong would perform in hotel rooms when the band was touring, which included jumping back and forth from bed to bed. And two songs, "Slow Spin" and "The Warbler," were ruminations on growing older.

== Artwork and packaging ==
Upon initial release, there were two different versions of album cover artwork for Free Flying Soul, depending on the audio format. The cat clock featured in the interior artwork was Michaels' own, and the flying creature on the cover of the CD was brought on tour with the band, where it hung inside Hindalong's bass drum. The flying frog featured on the cover of the cassette came from the aforementioned Wild Animals store, and according to Hindalong, was his most expensive purchase, costing $400 at that time. Initially, photographer Norman Jean Roy refused to take photos of the creatures Hindalong purchased, but was finally cajoled into it by Michaels.

== Release ==
Free Flying Soul was released in March 1996 on CD and cassette, the two main audio formats at that time. Three singles were released from the album to Christian radio. "The Ocean" was sent to CHR stations where it peaked at #20 on the CCM CHR chart. The two rock singles performed better in Christian rock programming: "Away with the Swine" peaked at #6 on the CCM Rock chart, while "Sled Dog"—for which the Choir created a music video—peaked at #8.

In the early 2000s, Free Flying Soul was released for digital download on iTunes and is now widely available on various music streaming platforms.

=== Remastered version (2024) ===
As a result of a successful 2024 Kickstarter campaign, Free Flying Soul was reissued on a single CD and a gatefold LP in November 2024, this time fully remastered. This was the album’s first vinyl release, and it came in two "splatter" color options, along with a custom-engraved wooden box to hold both versions as well as other campaign rewards. Like all the Choir’s previous re-releases, the band recorded audio commentary for each song, which was provided to Kickstarter supporters as a digital download, and featured Hindalong, Daugherty and Michaels. Included in the advance digital release in July 2024 were the instrumental tracks for each song—with the notable exception of "Slow Spin," since according to Michaels, Sony Music could not locate the masters—along with a new, reimagined version of "The Ocean," which was originally released to Patreon supporters.

== Tour ==
When signing with Tattoo, the Choir agreed to tour in support of Free Flying Soul as long as that tour would be its last. With the assistance of Wayne Everett on percussion and Bill Campbell (from the Throes) on guitar, the Choir played a 30-city "farewell tour" for four months in 1996, which concluded in July at the Sonshine Festival in Minnesota. Common Children, featuring Marc Byrd—who would later become a member of the Choir in 2005—was the featured opening act on this tour.

An hour of the Choir’s 1996 performance at Cornerstone on this tour was included on the video release, Tattoo Video Hoopla, Volume 1, released in March 1997, and this also featured the music video for "Sled Dog."

=== Let It Fly ===
To chronicle this tour, the Choir released their first live album Let it Fly in March 1997, which was a collection of tracks recorded at five different concerts in Pennsylvania, Texas, Michigan, Missouri and Ohio. Brian Quincy Newcomb, a frequent contributor to CCM Magazine and founding editor of Harvest Rock Syndicate, also provided opening and closing remarks. Writing for 7ball, reviewer Scott W. Christopher said that "Let it Fly has all of the sweet charm and distorted fury of a bootleg recording," and added that the album was a "wonderful keepsake" and a "good cross-section of their work." The album was released as an enhanced CD, which included the "Sled Dog" music video, interviews, and a pictorial biography of the band.

== Critical reception ==
Professional ratings
Review scores
Source	Rating
CCM Magazine	Favorable
Cross Rhythms	7/10 stars
7ball	Favorable
The News & Observer	Favorable
Daily Press	3/4 stars
Dayton Daily News	3/4 stars
SEE Magazine	Favorable
AllMusic	3/5 stars

Critical reaction at the time was positive. Bruce A. Brown, writing for CCM Magazine, commended the Choir's "rapid musical growth" over the prior 10 years, and said that "Free Flying Soul needs to be studied and savored; its intricacies offer greater understanding through repeated listening." He praised the band for "simply being what it has grown up to be—four guys in their 30s, making music that's relevant to that age group without copping an exclusionary attitude." Mark Sherwood, writing for Cross Rhythms, agreed and said the "lyrics are as always, deep," adding that, "musically, they are not afraid to experiment and try things out of the ordinary." He called "If You're Listening," a "standout track […] with lyrics that soothe the soul." The News & Observer said the "dreamy guitar-pop tack" of the songs on Free Flying Soul "recall the 'progressive' rock of groups such as Genesis, only much more subtle and free of bombast." Brent Castillo, writing for Knight Ridder in the Daily Press, was in agreement, saying that the music was "atmospheric, murky and psychedelic. The affected electric guitars are heavy, but subdued. The rhythm of the percussion is often unusual with unexpected textures." He pointed out that the lyrics "often seem just out of reach. To understand them, you have to go out and grab them; they won't just fall into your lap." James Lloyd, in the Dayton Daily News, concurred, saying that "the lyrics and music are more likely to tease and tantalize than browbeat. But they are more subtle than simple." He added that "'Salamander,' 'Sled Dog,' 'The Warbler' and all manner of fauna are reflected in the titles, but beneath the surface, you'll find the human animal being examined." This subtle nature of the album had writer Terry Hughes of SEE Magazine "scratching the dome" over the Choir's "lack of success," stating that "thinking man’s alternarock is no stranger to the charts and Free Flying Soul shouldn't be an exception." In the lead review for 7ball, reviewer Chris Well called the album "a welcome letter from an old friend," saying that the band "is no longer trying to find themselves; they seem content with who they are and where they are going." He added that "Free Flying Soul [is] exactly the sort of record that lasts—we will be listening to this for decades."

Retrospectively, the album has also been well-received. Darryl Cater at AllMusic called Free Flying Soul "a little less noisy" than Speckled Bird. While criticizing the songwriting for being "a bit short on fresh ideas this time," he pointed out that "there also moments of alluringly adventurous intelligence." He concluded that with this album, the band had struck a "rare balance of hope and humility." Barry Alfonso, in The Billboard Guide to Contemporary Christian Music, wrote that Free Flying Soul was "an extension of what Speckled Bird had achieved," and was "among the group's most popular" releases. Mark Allan Powell, writing in the Encyclopedia of Contemporary Christian Music, said that Free Flying Soul "celebrates the ability to find pleasure in little things, including a few things that aren't always on conservative Christianity's approved pleasures menu: a glass of wine at a wedding ('Away with the Swine') or a cigar with a neighbor who's just had a child ('Yellow-Haired Monkeys')." He singled out "The Ocean" as an album highlight, calling the "Beatlesque Sgt. Peppers-type tune" "practically a worship song, likening the Christian church to a sea that is continually purified by the tears of God."

=== Accolades ===
- CCM Magazine
  - Readers' Choice: Best Alt/Rock Album (included in list)
- 7ball
  - 1996: Best of the Year (#5)

=== Awards and nominations ===
- 28th Annual Dove Awards (1997) – Alternative/Modern Rock Album of the Year (winner)

== Track listing ==
All lyrics by Steve Hindalong. All music by Derri Daugherty, unless otherwise noted.

No.	Title	Music	Length
1.	"Salamander"	Derri Daugherty, Steve Hindalong	3:24
2.	"Polar Boy"	Daugherty, Tim Chandler, Hindalong	4:34
3.	"Sled Dog"	Daugherty, Hindalong, Chandler	3:00
4.	"Away with the Swine"		3:01
5.	"The Ocean"		4:16
6.	"If You're Listening"		5:40
7.	"The Chicken"	Chandler, Daugherty, Hindalong	6:26
8.	"Slow Spin"	Chandler, Hindalong	1:48
9.	"Leprechaun (Note: Tim Chandler is credited in the CD booklet with contributing one word to this song's lyrics.)"	Chandler, Hindalong	2:47
10.	"Yellow-Haired Monkeys"	Daugherty, Hindalong	1:29
11.	"Butterfly"		4:05
12.	"The Warbler (Note: Wayne Everett is credited in the CD booklet with contributing two phrases, totaling six words, to this song's lyrics.)"	Hindalong	4:07
Total length:			44:37

2024 remastered edition — Vinyl (Side one)
No.	Title	Music	Length
1.	"Salamander"	Daugherty, Hindalong	3:24
2.	"Polar Boy"	Daugherty, Chandler, Hindalong	4:34
3.	"Sled Dog"	Daugherty, Hindalong, Chandler	3:01
4.	"Away with the Swine"		3:01
5.	"The Ocean"		4:16
6.	"Butterfly"		4:05

2024 remastered edition — Vinyl (Side two)
No.	Title	Music	Length
1.	"If You're Listening"		5:40
2.	"The Chicken"	Chandler, Daugherty, Hindalong	6:29
3.	"Slow Spin"	Chandler, Hindalong	1:48
4.	"Leprechaun"	Chandler, Hindalong	2:46
5.	"Yellow-Haired Monkeys"	Daugherty, Hindalong	1:29
6.	"The Warbler"	Hindalong	4:06
Total length:			44:39

2024 remastered edition — Band Commentary (Digital download)
No.	Title	Length
1.	"Choir Commentary: Free Flying Soul"	46:12
Total length:		46:12

Let It Fly
No.	Title	Music	Length
1.	"Introduction [Brian Quincy Newcomb]"		1:13
2.	"Circle Slide / Sled Dog"		9:32
3.	"Yellow Skies"		4:24
4.	"Away with the Swine"		2:46
5.	"Consider"	Daugherty, Chandler	4:50
6.	"Kissers and Killers"	Daugherty, Chandler	3:22
7.	"Sentimental Song"		4:42
8.	"Sad Face"	Daugherty, Chandler	4:39
9.	"Tear for Tear / About Love"		7:02
10.	"Beautiful Scandalous Night"		6:05
11.	"Restore My Soul"		10:08
Total length:			57:52

== Personnel ==
=== Free Flying Soul ===
Personnel taken from Free Flying Soul liner notes.

The Choir

- Derri Daugherty – lead vocals, guitars
- Steve Hindalong – drums, percussion, child's piano, vocals, lead vocal on "Slow Spin"
- Tim Chandler – bass guitar, guitars
- Dan Michaels – saxophone (Note: Though an official band member, Michaels actually does not appear on this album except on the first track, "Salamander.")

Guest performers

- Wayne Everett – guitar, percussion, bongos, hand claps, chimes, sleigh bells, vocals
- Phil Madeira – Chamberlin strings and flutes
- Chrissy Colbert – bass guitar effects
- Marc Byrd – vocals
- Jenny Gullen – vocals
- Jerry Chamberlain – vocals
- Sharon McCall – vocals

Production

- Steve Hindalong – producer
- Derri Daugherty – producer, engineer, mixer ("The Ocean," "Slow Spin" at Neverland Studios)
- John Haag – executive producer [2024 remaster]
- Dan Michaels – associate producer [2024 remaster], art coordination, clock photo
- Lisa Michaels – associate producer [2024 remaster]
- Skye McCaskey – engineer
- Paul Salvo – mixer (Scrimshaw Sound)
- Tim Chandler – inspiration, additional production
- Wayne Everett – inspiration, additional production
- Norman Jean Roy – cover and creature photos
- Jim Dantzler – art direction, design (Flywheel Design)
- Marc Ludena – graphic design (update) [2024 remaster]
- Gina Gigglio – styling, creature hunt
- Mark Quattrochi – A&R direction
- Nigel Palmer – remastering (Lowland Masters) [2024 remaster]

=== Let It Fly ===
Personnel taken from Let It Fly liner notes.

The Choir

- Derri Daugherty – lead vocals, guitar
- Steve Hindalong ("you can call him Skinny") – drums, vocals
- Tim Chandler – bass guitar
- Dan Michaels ("from Akron, Ohio") – saxophone, Lyricon

Guest performers

- Wayne Everett – percussion
- Bill Campbell – guitar
- Brian Quincy Newcomb – narrator (opening and closing remarks)

Production

- Paul Thur – engineer (live sound)
- Dave Leonhardt – engineer (monitor)
- Skye McCaskey – recording
- Derri Daugherty – mixing (at Neverland)
- Eric Wolf – mastering
- Keith Rintala – lighting director
- Jim Dantzler – art direction, design
- Dan Michaels – art coordination
- Dough Rioux – crew (bus driver)
- Recorded at Penn State University – University Park, PA; Calvin College − Grand Rapids, MI; Babes – Austin, TX; Evangel College – Springfield, MO; Christ United Methodist Church – Dayton, OH.

== Notes ==
Bibliography

- Howard, Jay R.; Streck, John M. (1999). Apostles of Rock: The Splintered World of Contemporary Christian Music. Lexington, Kentucky, USA: University Press of Kentucky. ISBN 0-8131-8396-0.
- Conant, Andy; Palmer, Dave (2001). The Choir: Never Say Never: The First 20 Years. Brentwood (Nashville, Tennessee), USA: Galaxy21 Music. ISBN 0-688-12672-3.
- Alfonso, Barry (2002). The Billboard Guide to Contemporary Christian Music. New York, New York, USA: Billboard Books. ISBN 0-8230-7718-7.
- Powell, Mark Allan (2002). Encyclopedia of Contemporary Christian Music. Peabody, Massachusetts, USA: Hendrickson Publishers. ISBN 1-5656-3679-1.
