= Derri Daugherty =

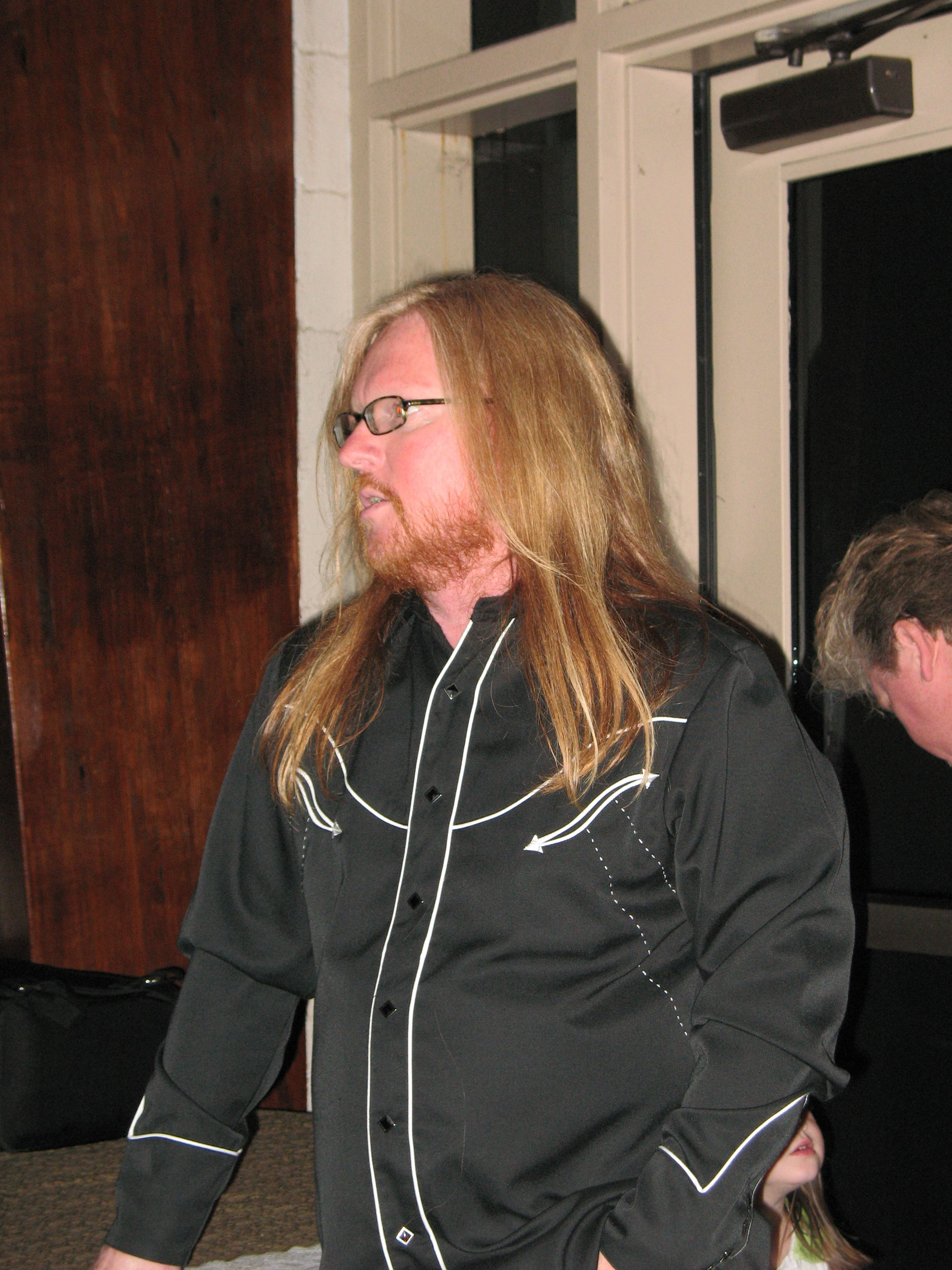
- Daugherty on June 22, 2007

Background information
- Born: October 13, 1958 (age 68)
- Genre: Alternative rock
- Occupations: Record producer musician songwriter
- Instruments: Vocals, guitar

Derri Daugherty (born Derald Daugherty; October 13, 1958) is an American record producer, songwriter, guitarist and singer, best known as the lead singer and guitarist for band the Choir.

Daugherty is also one of the founding members of the Roots music supergroup Lost Dogs with Terry Scott Taylor, Michael Roe and Gene Eugene.

Daugherty began his musical career as an engineer and roadie for the band Daniel Amos. Their bassist, Tim Chandler, introduced Daugherty to Steve Hindalong and the two soon began to write songs together and eventually formed the Choir. Daugherty now owns and operates Neverland, a recording studio in Nashville, Tennessee.

Daugherty's engineering credits include albums for Randy Stonehill, The Swoon, Lifesavers Underground, Michael Knott, the Prayer Chain, Riki Michele, the Waiting, Sarah Masen, Pierce Pettis, Common Children, Jeff Johnson, Caedmon's Call, Buddy Miller, Julie Miller, the Throes, and others. In recent years, Daugherty has become an accomplished producer, with albums by Twila Paris and Sheila Walsh to his credit. Perhaps his most well known production work is with Hindalong on the City on a Hill series.

== Discography ==
- A Few Unfinished Songs, 2004, ep Lo-Fidelity Records www.lo-fidelity.com
- Clouds Echo in Blue, 2011, ambient instrumental guitar
- Hush Sorrow, 2016
- Unhypnotized, 2018, single from album, The Color of Dreams
- The Color of Dreams, 2018
