= Fear of the Digital Remix =

Remix album by Deitiphobia
- Released: January 1995
- Recorded: 1991–1992
- Genre: EBM, industrial
- Length: 40:04
- Label: Myx Records
- Producer: Michael Knott

Deitiphobia chronology
Clean (1994)	Fear of the Digital Remix (1995)	Lo:Fi.Vs.Sci:Fi (1999)

Professional ratings
Review scores
Source	Rating
Allmusic	link

Fear of the Digital Remix is the third studio album by industrial band Deitiphobia, released in January 1995 by Myx Records. All the songs on the album were created by Michael Knott using samples from two earlier Deitiphobia albums, Fear of God and Digital Priests - the Remixes, which he digitally edited to produce songs that barely resembled the originals they were taken from.

== Track listing ==
All songs written by Michael Knott.

1. "TV" – 3:53
2. "Blind Hate" – 3:20
3. "Exorcist" – 4:38
4. "Need" – 4:08
5. "Religious Fanatic" – 4:52
6. "Mastermind" – 2:18
7. "Wilbur" – 4:21
8. "The Late Pastor Harry Dean" – 3:36
9. "Arc" – 3:50
10. "B-Movie" – 2:25
11. "Vamp Jesus" – 2:37

== Personnel ==
- Wally Shaw – vocals, keyboards, percussion, cover design
- Brent Stackhouse – vocals, programming
- Michael Knott – production
- Brian Gardner – mastering
- Bob Conlon – cover design
- Thom Roy – art direction
- Matthew Duffy – A&R
