= Love Gift =

product # bvcd 3482 (love gift)

Studio album by Breakfast with Amy
- Released: 1992
- Genre: Christian alternative rock
- Length: 50:56
- Label: Blonde Vinyl Records
- Producer: Breakfast with Amy

Breakfast with Amy chronology
Dad (1991)	product # bvcd 3482 (love gift) (1992)	Live At The Hawleywood Bowl! (1995)

product # bvcd 3482 (love gift) or Love Gift is the third and final studio album by the Christian alternative rock band Breakfast with Amy, released in 1992. Love Gift was the band's last release on Blonde Vinyl Records, and ended up being one of the last releases by any record label owned by Michael Knott. The album is considered a concept album with random audio inserts, short phone conversations, instrumental jams, and pre-song warm ups, as well as two self-described "dramas". Also included were two live songs from a previous tour. Musically, Love Gift continues with the punk/alternative rock sounds of their previous release Dad, and could be considered their most progressive album to date.

The original version of Love Gift was to be released on the Vox Vinyl label. The Vox Vinyl version of the album (most cuts were re-recorded for the Blonde Vinyl Records album) remains unreleased.

== Track listing ==
All songs written by Breakfast with Amy.

1. "[Sample - Listening Advice]" – 0:25
2. "Ralph's Garage" – 2:39
3. "[Sample Loop]" – 0:07
4. "Jello Wiggle" – 2:57
5. "Song Of The Humpback Whale" – 0:41
6. "[Sample - Audio Balance Established]" – 0:05
7. "Uniform Tree" – 5:04
8. "Paul Calls Mr. Rhumba From A Plane" – 0:40
9. "Velvety Dave At The Naugahyde Lounge" – 0:42
10. "Voices" – 1:42
11. "Little Maxine's Epiphany" – 4:48
12. "Edwin Loves TX!" – 1:07
13. "Fashion Gal" – 2:51
14. "Toth Calls Rumby" – 0:14
15. "[Accordion Warm-Up]" – 0:30
16. "Jonas' Russian Accordion" – 1:24
17. "The Tollhouse Waltz" – 4:00
18. "Ad America (Baby Baby Baby Version)" – 3:07
19. "Videos And Food" – 4:47
20. "Mrs. Rhumba Calls Mr. Rhumba" – 0:16
21. "Happy Song (Featuring Sol And Hank, The Metro Twins)" – 2:30
22. "You (Live)" – 4:04
23. "Social Studies (Live)" – 5:08
24. "Mum Calls Dave" – 0:29

== Personnel ==
- David Koval — vocals, electric sitar, acoustic guitar
- Edwin Wohler — bass guitar
- Christopher Colbert — guitar
- Caryn Colbert — guitar
- Paul Pelligrin — drums
- Michael J. Pritzl — acoustic guitar
- Christopher Colbert — engineer
- Mr. Rhumba — assistant engineer

== Miscellaneous information ==
The track listing on the back of the album omits tracks 1, 3, 6, and 15.
