= Prints of Darkness =

Studio album by Dead Artist Syndrome
- Released: 1990
- Recorded: 1990
- Genre: Gothic rock, indie rock, darkwave
- Length: 37:49
- Label: Originally released on Public Records and rereleased on Blonde Vinyl
- Producer: Brian Healy, Thom Roy

Dead Artist Syndrome chronology
Prints of Darkness (1990)	Devils, Angels & Saints (1992)

Prints of Darkness is the 1990 debut album by Dead Artist Syndrome. Originally released independently on Public Records and later by Blonde Vinyl Records, It was the first album released on a major label to introduce gothic rock to the Christian music industry gaining Brian Healy the title "The Father of Christian Goth". CCM Magazine categorically stated "The best example of what Christian Alternative Music is".

== Recording ==
The album was recorded at Neverland Studios and Whitefield Studios. In 1990, Brian Healy independently released Prints of Darkness as a one-man band. The album is characterized by post-punk influenced guitars, dark synthesizers and Healy's deep, gothic baritone vocals. Musicians Gym Nicholson and Ojo Taylor of Christian alternative rock group Undercover, Mike Sauerbrey of Christian alternative rock band The Choir and Lifesavers Underground frontman and Blonde Vinyl Records president Mike Knott each made guest appearances.

At the time the album was released, most Christian music enthusiasts who weren't familiar with gothic music didn't know how to classify Prints of Darkness. It was most often compared to one of the best known gothic rock groups, The Sisters of Mercy. The album displayed satirical lyrics, a theme Healy would later become known for. Both Dead Artist Syndrome and its gothic rock style achieved more notice after Blonde Vinyl Records reissued Prints of Darkness in late 1991. The album begins with the song "Christmas", which is not a Christmas carol, but a rather sarcastic rock song that was said be a denouncement of the secularization and commercialization of what has become known as the "winter holiday season". "Amy" is a haunting, romantic ballad, while "Red" is a gloomy piece about a man who is mourning the loss of his wife, who may have either cheated on him, divorced him or died. The lyrics are said to symbolically to describe the apostasy of many churches, and relate to the Bible's description of the Church as the "Bride of Christ". The album ends with "Reach" which is a synthesizer-driven worship song.

The album was re-issued in 2003 as a 13th Anniversary Edition with three bonus songs ("Surrender", "Rich Girl" and "Christmas [live with 77's]" on the label BCM Music. "Rich Girl" was originally recorded for Prints of Darkness, but left off because it was thought to be too sarcastic at the time.

== Track listing ==
1. "Christmas" (3:36)
2. "Amy" (3:40)
3. "Dancing Without Touching" (3:25)
4. "Vision" (3:35)
5. "Hope" (4:34)
6. "Dance With Me" (4:03)
7. "Think of Me" (3:15)
8. "Red" (3:39)
9. "Reach" (3:30)

== Credits ==
- Backing Vocals - Annica Svensson (tracks: 9), Brian Miller (7) (tracks: 9), Camille Miller (tracks: 9), Roger Mantell (tracks: 9)
- Bass, Guitar [Acoustic] - Mike Knott (tracks: 2 to 5)
- Bass, Keyboards - Michael Saurerbrey (tracks: 3 to 5)
- Executive Producer - Thom Roy
- Guitar - Gym Nicholson (tracks: 1, 3, 4, 6 to 8)
- Guitar [Rhythm & Acoustic] - Chris Harvey (tracks: 3, 5)
- Keyboards - Jeff Sheets (tracks: 2, 3, 5), Ojo Taylor (tracks: 1, 6 to 9)
- Mixed By - Brian Healy, Ojo Taylor, Thom Roy
- Producer - Brian Healy
- Recorded By - Brad Jeffers (tracks: 1, 6 to 9), Dave Hackbarth (tracks: 1, 6 to 9), Ojo Taylor (tracks: 1, 6 to 9), Scott Macklin (tracks: 2 to 5)
- Synthesizer [Synclavier] - Whitney Quinn (tracks: 2 to 5)
- Vocals - Brian Healy
