= Deitiphobia =

1990–2001 Christian Music Band

- Also known as: Donderfliegen, DPHB3K
- Origin: Texas, United States
- Genres: Industrial, electro, techno
- Years active: 1990–2001
- Labels: Blonde Vinyl, Slava Music, Myx, N*Soul
- Past members: Wally Shaw, aka Franky Vivid; Brent Stackhouse; Sheri Shaw; Wil Foster; Michael Knott; Luke Mazerri; Josh Plemon; Monique Swaback; Kevin 131
- Website: Deitiphobia on Myspace

Deitiphobia is a Christian industrial, electro and techno band from the United States formed in 1990 consisting of the duo of Wally Shaw and Brent Stackhouse. Known originally as Donderfliegen (translated into band speak as 'darn that fly'), the band changed names to Deitiphobia in 1991 to better clarify the band's focus on Christianity. The band's name means "Fear of God".

== History ==
=== Early years (1990–1992) ===
Deitiphobia was initially formed in 1990 under the name Donderfliegen by artists Wally Shaw and Brent Stackhouse. They released a demo album, Digital Priests, on their own independent label, Slava Music. The name change from Donderfliegen to Deitiphobia was first announced on-stage at the Cornerstone New Band Showcase performance of 1991. Their first major release, Fear of God, was released later that year when the band was signed to Blonde Vinyl Records. Slava Music subsequently became a sub-label of Blonde Vinyl.

A remix of the band's independent first release, Digital Priests - the Remixes followed in 1992 on the new Slava Music sub-label, and became known as Deitiphobia's unofficial second album. 1992 also brought a change in the line-up when Stackhouse parted ways with the band to form Wigtop with his vocalist wife, Heather - which released its first and only album, Revelation 1921 that year on Blonde Vinyl – Slava Music. Stackhouse went on to be involved with the electronic dance band X-Propagation with Bryon Payne. The band released one spiritual warfare themed album, Conflict, in 1993.

=== Reformation (1993–1998) ===
After Shaw and Stackhouse separated, Shaw relocated to Chicago to continue with Deitiphobia releases. Shaw's fiancé, Sheri Swaback (later Sheri Shaw) stepped in to fill the keyboard and vocals positions in Deitiphobia. Joined with guitarist and percussionist Josh Plemon, the band released Clean on Myx Records in 1994. The following year brought Fear of the Digital Remix. The album was more of a project by former Blonde Vinyl head and alternative artist Michael Knott than an effort by the band. For the album, Knott remixed elements of the band's first two albums into new compositions. The band also featured another new member at live performances, former Sorrow of Seven guitarist Kevin 131.

The Shaws spent the latter half of the 90's focused on their industrial rock side project Massivivid (originally known as Vivid), formed in 1996. Unlike the electronic sound of Deitiphobia, Massivivid featured a more guitar-driven sound. Subsequently, the band won a Dove Award for its debut album, Brightblur, released in 1998.

=== Comeback (1999–2001) ===
Deitiphobia was relaunched in 1999 with Wil Foster, who was a member of Massivivid and also founded techno band Sheltershed. The band's fourth official studio album, Lo:Fi.Vs.Sci:Fi, was released on N*Soul Records that year. Wally Shaw went on to run a remix competition on MP3.com in 2000, where he released the source material under the name DPHB3K. After the competition three subsequent versions of a remix album, Persist! Remix!, were released on MP3.com, along with Vivaphobia - Medium.Rare, a collection of demos and miscellaneous tracks by Deitiphobia and Massivivid. The following year the original Donderfliegen demo was re-released as Donderfliegen by Millennium Eight Records.

=== Aftermath (2002–2007) ===
Shortly after the launch of Lo:Fi.Vs.Sci:Fi, Sheri Shaw left both Deitiphobia and Massivivid. As of September 2007 she has been working on a new project, Sstaria, alongside Lyte of industrial / progressive trance band Delta-S, following a collaboration on the song "Erase" from the album Voyage to Isis. In 2007 Foster and Wally Shaw also independently released a Deitiphobia compilation album titled Sweet:Hereafter. However, contrary to speculation, Wally confirmed that Deitiphobia would not be making a comeback, although they did continue to write for Massivivid.

== Band members ==
- Wally Shaw (1990–2001) – vocals, keyboards, percussion
- Brent Stackhouse (1990–1994) – writing, vocals, programming, artwork
- Sheri Shaw (1994–2001) – keyboards, vocals
- Wil Foster (1999–2001) – keyboards
- Michael Knott (1994–1995) – guitars, vocals, production
- Luke Mazerri (1994) – keyboards, sub enforcement
- Josh Plemon (1994) – guitars, percussion
- Monique Swaback (1994) – prayer on the song "Clean"
- Kevin 131 (1995) – live guitar

== Discography ==
=== Studio albums ===
- Digital Priests (as Donderfliegen, 1990, Slava Music)
- Fear of God (1991, Blonde Vinyl)
- Clean (1994, Myx)
- Fear of the Digital Remix (1995, Myx)
- Sci:Fi vs. Low:Fi (1999, N*Soul)

=== Compilation albums ===
- Viviphobia - Medium.Rare (2000, MP3.com)
- Sweet:Hereafter (2007, independent)

=== Remix albums ===
- Digital Priests - the Remixes (1992, Blonde Vinyl – Slava Music)
- Persist! Remix! v1.0 (2000, MP3.com)
- Persist! Remix! v1.1 (2001, MP3.com)
- Persist! Remix! v1.2 (2001, MP3.com)
