= Clean (Deitiphobia album) =

Studio album by Deitiphobia
- Released: May 3, 1994
- Recorded: 1993
- Studio: River North Recording Studios, Chicago
- Genre: EBM, industrial
- Length: 60:40
- Label: Myx
- Producer: Wally Shaw

Deitiphobia chronology
Digital Priests - the Remixes (1992)	Clean (1994)	Fear of the Digital Remix (1995)

Professional ratings
Review scores
Source	Rating
AllMusic	3/5 stars

Clean is the second full-length studio album from industrial band Deitiphobia, released in 1994 by Myx Records. It is the earliest Deitiphobia album not to feature Brent Stackhouse, who left in 1992, and was also the band's debut for the Myx label. The album features Sheri Shaw, who remained with Deitiphobia until it dissolved in 2001, and Michael Knott, who produced Fear of the Digital Remix and was also the founder of the band's previous record label, Blonde Vinyl.

== Track listing ==
All songs written and performed by Deitiphobia.

1. "The Shake (Part 1 - Body)" – 5:09
2. "Take the Sin" – 4:31
3. "Hypnotique" – 2:48
4. "Ancient" – 5:15
5. "Redemption Draweth Nigh" – 4:09
6. "Vivid" – 3:53
7. "Clean" – 3:16
8. "Go Prone" – 4:19
9. "The Shake (Part II - Brother)" – 4:51
10. "Enraptured" – 5:37
11. "Perfect Eyes" – 4:37
12. "Redemption" (K-otic Mix) – 4:19
13. "Perfect Eyes" (20/20 Mix) – 7:49

== Personnel ==
- Wally Shaw – vocals, keyboards, percussion
- Sheri Shaw – keyboards, vocals
- Michael Knott – guitars, vocals
- Josh Plemon – guitars, percussion
- Luke Mazerri – keyboards, sub enforcement
- Monique Swaback – prayer on the song "Clean"
- Darren Ford – engineering
- Thom Roy – art direction
- Bob Conlon – cover design
- Jack Weddell - design and composites
- Wayne Armstrong – photography
