= Dead Artist Syndrome =

American Christian gothic rock band

- Also known as: D.A.S.
- Origin: Orange County, California, U.S.
- Genres: Christian rock, gothic rock
- Years active: 1990–1995, 2001–2020
- Labels: Blonde Vinyl; Eden; Alarma; Galaxy21
- Past members: Brian Healy - death 1/12/2020; Ojo Taylor; Gym Nicholson; Ric Alba; John Piccari; Riki Michele Bunch Palmer; Marc Plainguet; Mike Sauerbrey; Steve Hindalong; Derri Daugherty; Michael Roe; David Leonhardt; Mark Harmon; Jeff Elbel
- Website: facebook.com/brian.healy.587

Dead Artist Syndrome was a Christian gothic rock band formed in 1989 in Orange County, California. The group consisted of singer-songwriter Brian Healy and a rotating cast of side men. Healy was dubbed the "father of Christian goth" by Rozz Williams, and was an ordained minister. The name of D.A.S. according to Healy is "Dead Artist Syndrome means greater in death than in life, be it James Dean, Van Gogh or Jesus Christ". His debut album Prints of Darkness was a notable, groundbreaking release. The band had been sporadically active due to health issues, releasing two albums in the 2000s, and another in 2015. In 2006, Dead Artist Syndrome was named "Outstanding Orange County Band" by the editors and readers of Rock City News, a Los Angeles local music paper. For several years Healy was privately in poor health his gallbladder exploded while recording vocals resulting in emergency surgery, and a neurological disorder his wife Marie Tullai Healy described as "a combination of Michael J. Fox and the late Foster Brooks everybody thought he was drunk, Brian was falling down he broke his arm, slurring his speech trying to complete his record, next thing we know he's in a wheelchair, finally in 2012 they discovered the cause and he had brain surgery and is 100% back to his old self and had no idea any of this was going on, inside his head everything was fine". Healy said on his Facebook page 'He's back" and is actively recording, producing others and hosting Frontline Records Rewind Broadcast and podcast Healy died January 12, 2020, of a brain hemorrhage.

Dead Artist Syndrome has included members of Undercover, The Choir, L.S.U., The 77's, and Ping backing Healy.

== Biography ==
=== First years (1990–1994) ===
Brian Healy while being a mainstream artist and actor was one of the first musicians to introduce gothic rock to the Christian music industry. In 1990, Healy independently released his first studio album, Prints of Darkness, as a one-man band. The album is characterized by post-punk influenced guitars, dark synthesizers and Healy's deep, gothic baritone vocals. Musicians Gym Nicholson and Ojo Taylor of Christian alternative rock group Undercover, Mike Sauerbrey of Christian alternative rock band The Choir and L.S.U. frontman and Blonde Vinyl Records president Mike Knott each made guest appearances.

At the time, most Christian music enthusiasts who weren't familiar with gothic music didn't know how to classify Prints of Darkness. It was most often compared to one of the best-known gothic rock groups, The Sisters of Mercy. The album displayed satirical lyrics, a theme Healy would later become known for. Both Dead Artist Syndrome and its gothic rock style achieved more notice after Blonde Vinyl Records reissued Prints of Darkness in late 1991. The album begins with the song "Christmas", which is not a Christmas carol, but a rather sarcastic rock song that was said be a denouncement of the secularization and commercialization of what has become known as the "winter holiday season", Healy himself has stated "Christmas". is about separation from faith, church, friends and family at what is supposed to be the best day of the year" in many public and radio interviews. "Amy" is a haunting, romantic ballad, and while rumor to be about Amy Grant, Healy has stated "it's not, but I let people think what they want, that said the idea of Amy Grant actually hearing the song and being creeped out was amusing to me, it's my Alice Cooper side" while "Red" is a gloomy piece about a man who is mourning the loss of his wife, who may have either cheated on him, divorced him or died. The lyrics are said to symbolically to describe the apostasy of many churches, and relate to the Bible's description of the Church as the "Bride of Christ". The album ends with "Reach" which is a synthesizer-driven worship song.

Healy released his second album Devils, Angels & Saints in 1992 on Eden Records. It was said that the album showcased a bit more accessible style while the music still fit in the gothic rock style of the early 1990s. Notable tracks include the sarcastic "Beautiful World", a passionate, gothic flavored cover of The Mamas & the Papas song "California Dreaming", as well as the haunting ballad "If the Stars Should Fall". Healy experimented with industrial sounds on "Obsexed", which is a commentary on sexual promiscuity, and features danceable synthesizers and processed vocals.

The musical versability widened on the third Dead artist Syndrome album, Happy Hour while still retaining with Healy's dark humor and gothic rock style. The album begins with the rock song "Y.S.D." ("Young, Sexy and Dead") which is a tragic tribute to the Marilyn Monroe and all others who lived fast and died young. Healy revisits the themes of apostasy and hypocrisy prevalent in Church on "Bride Song". Unlike the gloomy approach of "Red", "Bride Song" addresses the issue with dark humor and likens the church to a snotty, backstabbing woman. The so-called happy portion of the album's title is apparent on the songs "Radiation" and "Glory", both of which feature worship-filled lyrics, as radiation is a metaphor for the Holy Spirit. Also, Healy experiments with "surf punk" sounds on "U.S.A", which features a "ba ba ba" chorus similar to Ramones' classic "I Want to Be Sedated". The aforementioned "Bride Song" also features an old school punk rock approach, while the title track is a dreamy, guitar-driven instrumental that closes the album.

Mike Roe, Mark Harmon and David Leonhardt of Christian alternative rock group The 77's assisted on both Happy Hour and Devils, Angels & Saints.

=== Hiatus (1995–2000) ===
In 1995, Healy put Dead Artist Syndrome on hiatus for the rest of the decade. During that time, he became an ordained minister. He also became a father and survived a heart attack.

The Christian goth scene that Healy pioneered grew notably during the latter half of the 1990s. The gothic rock-opera/metal group Saviour Machine became the Christian goth movement's standard bearer and were joined by numerous other bands.

=== New era (2001–2020) ===
Healy reformed Dead Artist Syndrome in the early 2000s. He released a new album carrying the sarcastic title Jesus Wants You to Buy This Record in 2001; which was initially made available at Cornerstone Festival. The album was noted for its several new songs, including the gothic worship song "In Your Hands". The title track (a collaborative effort with D.A.S. sideman Jeff Elbel of Ping) was a biting, sarcastic commentary on the crass commercialism that has taken over parts of the CCM industry, "Life Amongst The Dead", "Pray" and "Rich Girl", which was originally recorded for Prints of Darkness, but left off because it was thought to be too sarcastic at the time. Healy co-worked up with Saviour Machine frontman Eric Clayton on a remake of the Daniel Amos' early 1980s song "Through the Speakers", and included covers of two songs from the 1970s: The Bee Gees' mournful ballad "I Started a Joke" and Cheap Trick's light-hearted rock song "Surrender", with the original's reference to Kiss replaced by Cheap Trick. Christian rock group The 77's made guest appearances on live versions of early songs "Christmas" and "Angeline", and Healy went acoustic on live recordings of "Hello" and "Beautiful World".

In 2003, Healy released his sixth studio album, Saving Grace. His criticism of the shallowness and hypocrisy that is said to infect the church resurfaced in "Christian America", which is an industrial rock song that delivers its message in a witty, sarcastic style similar to 1980s Christian new wave musician Steve Taylor. The album also includes a cover of Simon and Garfunkel's "Richard Cory", and a version of "Bride Song" recorded live at the Cornerstone Festival as an unlisted bonus track.

In a January 2013 interview, Ric Alba said he was working on a new Dead Artist Syndrome album with Healy, Ojo Taylor, Gym Nicholson, Riki Michele, Marc Plainguet, and John Picarri. The project was released in 2015 titled Kissing Strangers.

=== Healy's acting career ===
Brian Healy's activities extended outside of the realm of music into film and acting. On a number of occasions Healy was a stand-in double for actor John Candy; including such notable films as Spaceballs, The Great Outdoors, and Planes, Trains, and Automobiles. The influences of Healy's acting career can be seen in the dramatic aspects of his musical stage performances.

=== Music historian ===
Brian Healy was also considered a leading expert in radio and music programing. In 2008, he was awarded Rock City News Best DJ honors for his vast knowledge formatting various clubs and radio stations worldwide.

=== Personal life ===
After years of medical issues Healy died at the age of 60 on January 12, 2020

== Discography ==
- Prints of Darkness, 1990
- Devils, Angels & Saints (as D.A.S.), 1992
- Happy Hour, 1995
- "Through the Speakers" on When Worlds Collide: A Tribute to Daniel Amos, and the music of Terry Scott Taylor, 2000
- Jesus Wants You to Buy This Record: The Limited Edition Obligatory Cornerstone Release, 2001
- Saving Grace, 2003
- Prints of Darkness: 13th Anniversary Edition, 2003
- Kissing Strangers, 2015
