= Dad (Breakfast with Amy album) =

Studio album by Breakfast with Amy
- Released: 1991
- Genre: Christian alternative rock
- Length: 38:04
- Label: Blonde Vinyl Records
- Producer: Breakfast with Amy

Breakfast with Amy chronology
Everything was Beautiful and Nothing Hurt (1990)	Dad (1991)	Love Gift (1992)

Professional ratings
Review scores
Source	Rating
Allmusic	4.5/5 stars

Dad is the second studio album by the Christian alternative rock band Breakfast with Amy, released in 1991. Produced by the band at Casbah Studios in Fullerton, CA, Dad was the group's second studio album and first studio release with new label Blonde Vinyl Records. Breakfast with Amy's new home with Michael Knott's record company, which was at the time at the forefront of the Christian alternative rock scene in Southern California, allowed the band access to a much larger audience than before with Narrowpath Records. This album saw the band use more punk sounds than in their previous release, although some neo-psychedelic/funk influences are still present.

Songs from the album were featured on all of Blonde Vinyl's compilation CDs except their first, Blonde Vinyl Teaser I. This album was also one of the few during Blonde Vinyl's short lifespan to produce a music video (for the song "Me".)

== Track listing ==
All songs written by Breakfast with Amy.

1. "Me" – 3:41
2. "Tell Mama" – 2:58
3. "You" – 2:53
4. "So It Goes" – 4:53
5. "Mermelstein and the Disappearing Sink" – 4:18
6. "Ad America" – 3:59
7. "The Short, Happy Life of Henrietta" – 5:04
8. "Your Name" – 4:29
9. "You're Soaking in It" – 2:46
10. "Sea Shanty of an Icelandic Midwife" – 2:23
11. "Come On, Joan" – 2:45

== Personnel ==
- David Koval — vocals, electric sitar, acoustic guitar
- Edwin Wohler — bass guitar
- Christopher Colbert — guitar
- Caryn Colbert — guitar
- Paul Pelligrin — drums
- Michael J. Pritzl — acoustic guitar
- Christopher Colbert — engineer
- Mr. Rhumba — assistant engineer
- Doug Doyle — Mastered @ Digital Brothers, Costa Mesa, CA
