= Orphans, Misfits & Fragments =

Studio album by King Never
- Released: October 1, 2004
- Recorded: Finley Sound, Roseville, CA
- Genres: Alternative rock, progressive rock, ambient
- Length: 41:24
- Label: Marathon Records

King Never chronology
Ambient Guitar Noise: Volume 1 (2000)	Orphans, Misfits & Fragments (2004)	Lullabies & Sleepless Nights (Ambient Guitar Noise: Volume 2) (2007)

Orphans, Misfits & Fragments is the second studio album by King Never, consisting of 11 tracks ranging from ambient soundscapes to vibey modern rock and progressive pop songs with an experimental edge. Released by Marathon Records on October 1, 2004.

== Background ==
An evolution in the sonic explorations of founder Matt McCabe, the album marks four years since the previous release of 2000's Ambient Guitar Noise: Volume 1. McCabe incorporated more collaborators into the mix with the additional talents of Greg Asher, Jeff Elbel, and Kristy McCabe.

== Reception ==
Chris Macintosh of "WCWP 88.1 FM, in Woodmere, NY stated: "Absolutely brilliant album."

Brian Baker, writing for Amplifier Magazine: "King Never has been around in various forms for nearly a decade. The band was launched by guitarist Matt McCabe in the mid'90s as an experiment in realtime looping and ambient/rock genre blending. Orphans, Misfits & Fragments is only King Never's second full album in its ten year history, and it's clear from the finished product that McCabe has spent a great deal of time painstakingly assembling the album's evocative and entrancing content. McCabe's ambient looping creates a cerebral texture that serves as a soft foundation for his more traditional rock song structures and visceral and sinewy guitar flights. The result is an atmospheric blend of Brian Eno's dreamy meanderings and the prog/pop guitar tension of King Crimson's Robert Fripp and Adrian Belew."

Splendid Magazine wrote: Q: What if Robert Fripp had walked into the Garbage sessions instead of Butch Vig's Drew Carey Show-type buddies?

== Track listing ==
1. Desperate – 4.04
2. Upside Down Girl – 3:06
3. Noise Loop – 1:47
4. Fragments – 4:38
5. Gone – 4:31
6. One One Five – 3:39
7. Circular Drone – 2:47
8. Free – 3:57
9. Monday – 5:00
10. Endloop II – 5:23
11. Unknown – 2:32

== Personnel ==
- Matt McCabe: guitar, guitar loops, bass, drums, programming & vocals
- Greg Asher: vocals (tracks 2, 5 & 8) and programming (tracks 5 & 7)
- Jeff Elbel: guitar (tracks 1, 4, 8 & 9)
- Kristy McCabe: vocals (tracks 3, 4, 5, 7, 9 & 10)

== Production notes ==
- Stacey Vigallon: artwork
- Recorded, mixed and mastered by Matt McCabe at Finley Sound.
- Jeff Elbel's guitars recorded by Jeff Elbel at the Happy Club.
