= Lullabies & Sleepless Nights (Ambient Guitar Noise: Volume 2) =

Studio album by King Never
- Released: January 1, 2007
- Recorded: Finley Sound, Northern CA
- Genre: Electronic, ambient
- Length: 43:04
- Label: Marathon Records

King Never chronology
Orphans, Misfits & Fragments (2004)	Lullabies & Sleepless Nights (Ambient Guitar Noise: Volume 2) (2007)	Possibilities (2010)

Lullabies & Sleepless Nights (Ambient Guitar Noise: Volume 2) is the third studio album by King Never founder Matt McCabe, and a return to form of his solo ambient music guitar looping explorations. Released by Marathon Records on January 1, 2007.

== Background ==
After working with collaborators and venturing into the more progressive rock feel of 2004's Orphans, Misfits & Fragments, on the 10 year anniversary of Ambient Guitar Noise: Volume 1, with a title inspired by his children, McCabe again solos live with no overdubbing to release this sequel effort.

== Reception ==
AmbientMusicGuide.com said about the release: "I don't know whether "purist" is the word but Californian ambient guitarist King Never takes pride in choosing the riskier path of recording his tracks live, with no further editing or overdubs. With his electric guitar, effects and loop machines he creates a seductive and surprisingly broad palate of nocturnal sounds on Lullabies And Sleepless Nights. It's beatless and mostly gentle, shifting between tonal and slightly dissonant. There's the odd burst of jagged distortion just in case, I presume, you've nodded off too early. This is often impressive and eerily beautiful stuff and not just for guitar fans by any means. Rating 3.5/5."

== Track listing ==
1. Some Kind of Beginning – 0:28
2. First Light – 4:14
3. Beautifully Broken – 3:18
4. The Quiet Hour – 6:52
5. Interrupted – 1:24
6. The End of Never – 4:26
7. Things to Come – 2:54
8. Chaos of Day Fades To Night – 5:34
9. Almost Asleep – 4:24
10. Night of A Thousand Worries – 9:30

== Production notes ==
Released January 1, 2007.
Special thanks to John Aycock at Voodoo Lab.
Recorded, mixed and mastered by Matt McCabe at Finley Sound, somewhere in Northern California, USA.
Original artwork “Airplanes” by Weston D. McCabe
