= 37 (album) =

Studio album by King Never
- Released: April 24, 2013 remixed and remastered 2016
- Recorded: Finley Sound
- Genre: Alternative rock, progressive rock
- Length: 18:19
- Label: King Never

King Never chronology
Possibilities (2010)	37 (2013)	All These Things (2017)

37 is the fifth studio album by King Never consisting of five alternative and progressive rock tracks. Released on April 24, 2013, the album was remixed and remastered in 2016

== Background ==
Originally recorded and released in the spring of 2013. In order to have physical product to serve their building live audience, the band felt the album was rushed and too reductionist. After the untimely death of bassist Karl Lane the album was remixed and remastered in 2016. The new mixes feature additional keyboard and guitar parts that weren't included on the original release, but were recorded during the original sessions. Shortly after the release of 37, drummer Gontjes exited the band to pursue other projects.

In July 2014, an official lyric music video for the track "Mr. No" was released on the band's official YouTube channel.

== Reception ==
In a review of 37 for Prognaut.com, Joseph Shingler "Recommended for fans of 80s' alternative rock." and noted: "The music is influenced by bands like Police, The Fixx, Nirvana, Smashing Pumpkins, and 'Radiohead; and even some of the later period albums from the band Spirit can be detected in tracks like 'Push and Pull' and 'Mr. No'. For the most part the accessible compositions are sedate melancholy ballads; a bit on the short side, but with an infectious hook. Solid songwriting."

Jeff Elbel wrote of 37: "Fans of crafty electric guitar and bands like Porcupine Tree, Belew-era King Crimson and The Police will want to check out this King Never EP. It's a straight-shooting representation of what this tightly-knit trio can do on stage. Until I get the chance to see it happen in Chicago, I'll be spinning 37. I’ve been a fan of Matt McCabe's playing and songwriting an embarrassingly long amount of time, but for good reason. This set finds him making yet another forward push against the boundaries."

== Track listing ==
1. "Push & Pull" – 3:05
2. "Mr. No" – 4:12
3. "Stupid" – 4:36
4. "Change" – 3:07
5. "Upside Down Girl" – 3:23

== Production notes ==
Remixed and remastered December 12, 2016. Originally released April 24, 2013.
Matt McCabe: vocals, guitars and Moog bass pedals
Karl Lane: bass and keyboards
Scott Gontjes: drums and background vocals
