= Everything Was Beautiful and Nothing Hurt =

"Everything was beautiful and nothing hurt" is from an image of a tombstone within the 1969 novel Slaughterhouse-Five by Kurt Vonnegut, and may also refer to:

- Everything Was Beautiful and Nothing Hurt (Breakfast with Amy album)
- Everything Was Beautiful, and Nothing Hurt (Moby album)
- "Everything Was Beautiful and Nothing Hurt" (song), a song from the MewithoutYou album [A→B] Life

== See also ==
- Everything Was Beautiful, a 2022 album by Spiritualized
- And Nothing Hurt, a 2018 album by Spiritualized
