= Beyond the Veil =

Beyond the Veil may refer to:

- Beyond the Veil (album), a 1999 album by Tristania
- Beyond the Veil: Live at the Bobby Jones Gospel Explosion XIII, a 1996 album by Daryl Coley
- "Beyond the Veil" (song), a 2014 song by Lindsey Stirling
- "Beyond the Veil" (The Outer Limits), a television episode
- Beyond the Veil (comics), a comic by Rick Law
- Beyond the Veil, a 1985 book by Fatima Mernissi
- Beyond the Veil, a 2013 play by Deborah McAndrew
