= Digital Priests =

Studio album by Donderfliegen
- Released: 1990
- Recorded: 1990 at <3 Studio, Austin, Texas
- Genre: EBM, industrial
- Length: 52:38
- Label: Slava Music
- Producer: Donderfliegen

Deitiphobia chronology
Digital Priests (1990)	Fear of God (1991)

Digital Priests is a demo album by industrial band Deitiphobia, originally released under the name Donderfliegen in 1990 on Compact Cassette only by an independent label, Slava Music. It was subsequently re-released on CD in 2001 by Millennium Eight Records as Donderfliegen, this time under the name of Deitiphobia. It is one of only two albums released by Slava Music before it became a sub-label of Blonde Vinyl. The entire album was re-recorded and remixed in 1992, and released as Digital Priests - the Remixes.

== Track listing ==
1. "Red Society" – 4:58
2. "The World from an Altar" – 4:36
3. "Dance on My Creation" – 3:55
4. "Graveyards" – 4:44
5. "Attack the City Walls" – 6:00
6. "Have Mercy" – 4:59
7. "Love Among Thieves" – 6:19
8. "...And There Were Mystic Voices..." – 5:56
9. "What Faith?" – 6:28
10. "Almost Gone" – 4:36

== Personnel ==
- Wally Shaw – vocals, keyboards, percussion
- Brent Stackhouse – writing, vocals, programming, artwork
