= Sci:Fi vs. Low:Fi =

Studio album by Deitiphobia
- Released: December 1999
- Recorded: 1999
- Genre: Industrial
- Length: 68:18
- Label: N*Soul Records
- Producer: Deitiphobia

Deitiphobia chronology
Fear of the Digital Remix (1995)	Sci:Fi vs. Low:Fi (1999)

Professional ratings
Review scores
Source	Rating
Phantom Tollbooth	link
HM	(not rated)

Sci:Fi vs. Low:Fi is the fourth and last original studio album by industrial band Deitiphobia, and was released in December 1999 by N*Soul Records. It is a concept album based on a story written by Wally Shaw and science fiction author Graeme Udd. The plotlines of the story are woven into the album, telling the story of the band members' fictional alter egos in the dystopic world of the year 2226. The album features Wil Foster, who was a founding member of the Shaws' industrial rock side project Massivivid.

The album's sound is split between the concepts of low-fi and sci-fi tracks. The low-fi tracks are generally shorter and electronic, whereas the sci-fi tracks are longer and feature "apocalyptic-sounding" lyrics.

== Track listing ==
Track 18 also contains a hidden track called "Deep Intellectual Poem" which starts at 3:30.

1. "Humanifesto" – 3:32
2. "Hurler Avec Les Loups" – 1:01
3. "Spit Static" – 4:25
4. "Disembarking" – 0:33
5. "Episinner" – 3:47
6. "Electronomicon" – 1:08
7. "Tripwire" – 4:53
8. "Sonic Exfoliation" – 0:51
9. "Soldier Soul" – 5:21
10. "Transmission" – 4:01
11. "Publick!" – 0:38
12. "Savior Self" – 4:53
13. "Magnesium Blue" – 4:43
14. "EBN" – 1:05
15. "Persist-Resist" – 4:15
16. "Coelocanthe" – 3:55
17. "Charyatid" – 11:42
18. "Retrofit" – 7:27

== Personnel ==
- Wally Shaw – vocals, keyboards, percussion
- Sheri Shaw – keyboards, vocals
- Wil Foster – keyboards
