= Drew: The Man Behind the Poster =

Drew: The Man Behind The Poster
- Directed by: Erik Sharkey
- Written by: Greg Boas; Charles Ricciardi; Erik Sharkey; Jeff Yorkes
- Produced by: Charles Ricciardi; Greg Boas; Erik Sharkey; Rick Law
- Starring: Drew Struzan; Dylan Struzan; Harrison Ford; Guillermo del Toro; George Lucas; Michael J. Fox; Steven Spielberg; Alice Cooper; Leonard Maltin; Caroll Spinney
- Music by: Ryan Shore
- Production companies: Torino Pictures; Hefty; Sharkey Productions; Kino Lorber
- Release date: July 19, 2013
- Running time: 97 minutes
- Country: United States
- Language: English

Drew: The Man Behind the Poster is a 2013 American documentary film about the career of film poster artist Drew Struzan. It is directed by Erik Sharkey and premiered on July 19, 2013 at San Diego Comic-Con.

== Synopsis ==
The documentary features interviews with a number of people, including Struzan himself, his wife, Dylan Struzan, his son, Christian Struzan, directors Steven Spielberg, Guillermo del Toro and George Lucas, and actors Harrison Ford and Michael J. Fox. The film follows Struzan's career painting movie posters for films such as Star Wars, The Thing, Back to the Future, the Indiana Jones franchise, and the Harry Potter franchise.

The film delves into Struzan's art for Alice Cooper's album Welcome to My Nightmare, and also how his artwork for Guillermo del Toro's Hellboy, Hellboy II: The Golden Army, and Pan's Labyrinth, though greatly admired by del Toro, was rejected by the studio in favor of more photographic posters. This leads the documentary in a direction about how film studios are interested more in profit rather than quality, how film posters are more often photographs of the actors rather than paintings of them.

The documentary concludes with footage of Struzan at San Diego Comic-Con in 2010, wherein he receives the Inkpot Award for his illustrations. This is then followed by footage of Struzan talking about and showing his personal paintings not related to film, and how he spends his time painting not for someone else, but for himself, and how he often plays outside with grandson, Nico.

== Critical reception ==
On the review aggregator website Rotten Tomatoes, the film holds an approval rating of 44% based on nine reviews, with an average rating of 5.8/10. On Metacritic, the film has a weighted average score of 59 out of 100, based on 7 critics, indicating "mixed or average" reviews.

Andy Webster of The New York Times wrote that the film "becomes a mildly taxing torrent. And Mr. Struzan, while an agreeable presence, is not an especially engrossing speaker". Peter Debruge of Variety called the documentary "sophomore effort [that] is no masterpiece", although noting that he owned a Struzan poster himself and admired Struzan's "impressive oeuvre". Nick Schager of The A.V. Club appreciated that the documentary "makes a valid case for the artist as not simply an all-time great, but as a casualty of a business that prizes bottom-line cost management above unique creativity"; however, he disliked the film's focus on "lavishing adulation on Struzan".

== Awards ==
Year	Award	Category	Result
2013	Hollywood Film Festival	Best Documentary Feature	Won
2014	Dragon Con Independent Film Festival	Best Feature Film	Won
2014	Ridgewood Guild Film Festival	Best Documentary	Won
