= Digital Priests – The Remixes =

Digital Priests - The Remixes

Remix album by Deitiphobia
- Released: 1992
- Recorded: March 1992 at Purelight Productions, Pflugerville
- Genre: EBM, industrial
- Length: 60:28 (1992 original); 73:33 (1998 reissue)
- Label: Blonde Vinyl – Slava Music
- Producer: Deitiphobia

Deitiphobia chronology
Fear of God (1991)	Digital Priests - The Remixes (1992)	Clean (1994)

Alternative cover
- 1998 reissue album cover

Professional ratings
Review scores
Source	Rating
Allmusic	3/5 stars

Digital Priests – The Remixes is a remix album by industrial band Deitiphobia, originally released in 1992 on the Slava Music sub-label of Blonde Vinyl. The album features remixed versions of some of the songs from the band's original demo, Digital Priests, from which its name is derived. It also includes several new and previously unreleased songs. Digital Priests – The Remixes is sometimes described as Deitiphobia's unofficial second album. It was reissued in 1998 by Flaming Fish Music with three additional tracks, alongside the reissue of the band's debut album, Fear of God.

== Track listing ==
All songs written and performed by Deitiphobia.

=== Original release ===
1. "Red Society" – 5:07
2. "The World from an Altar" – 4:33
3. "Dance on My Creation" – 3:49
4. "Graveyards" – 3:24
5. "Mystic Voices" – 5:10
6. "Have Mercy" – 4:46
7. "Attack the City Walls" – 3:43
8. "What Faith?" – 5:53
9. "Bow to the Cross" – 2:09
10. "Forgiven" – 5:58
11. "Battleground" – 6:44
12. "Almost Gone (I.V.)" – 4:35
13. "Attack the City Walls" (Mastermix) – 4:37

=== 1998 reissue ===
14. "Fluid" – 3:43
15. "Graveyards Are for the Dead" (Donderdemo) – 3:56
16. "Love Among Thieves" (Donderdemo) – 5:26

== Personnel ==
- Wally Shaw – vocals, keyboards, percussion
- Brent Stackhouse – vocals, programming
- Steve Becker – engineering
- Greg Sylvester – design
- David Gaddy – photography

=== 1998 reissue ===
- Simon O'Leary – vocals on the song "Graveyards Are For The Dead" (Donderdemo)
- Carson Pierce – executive producer
- Brian C. Janes – remastering
- Ed Finkler – artwork, layout
