= Rick Law =

American film producer

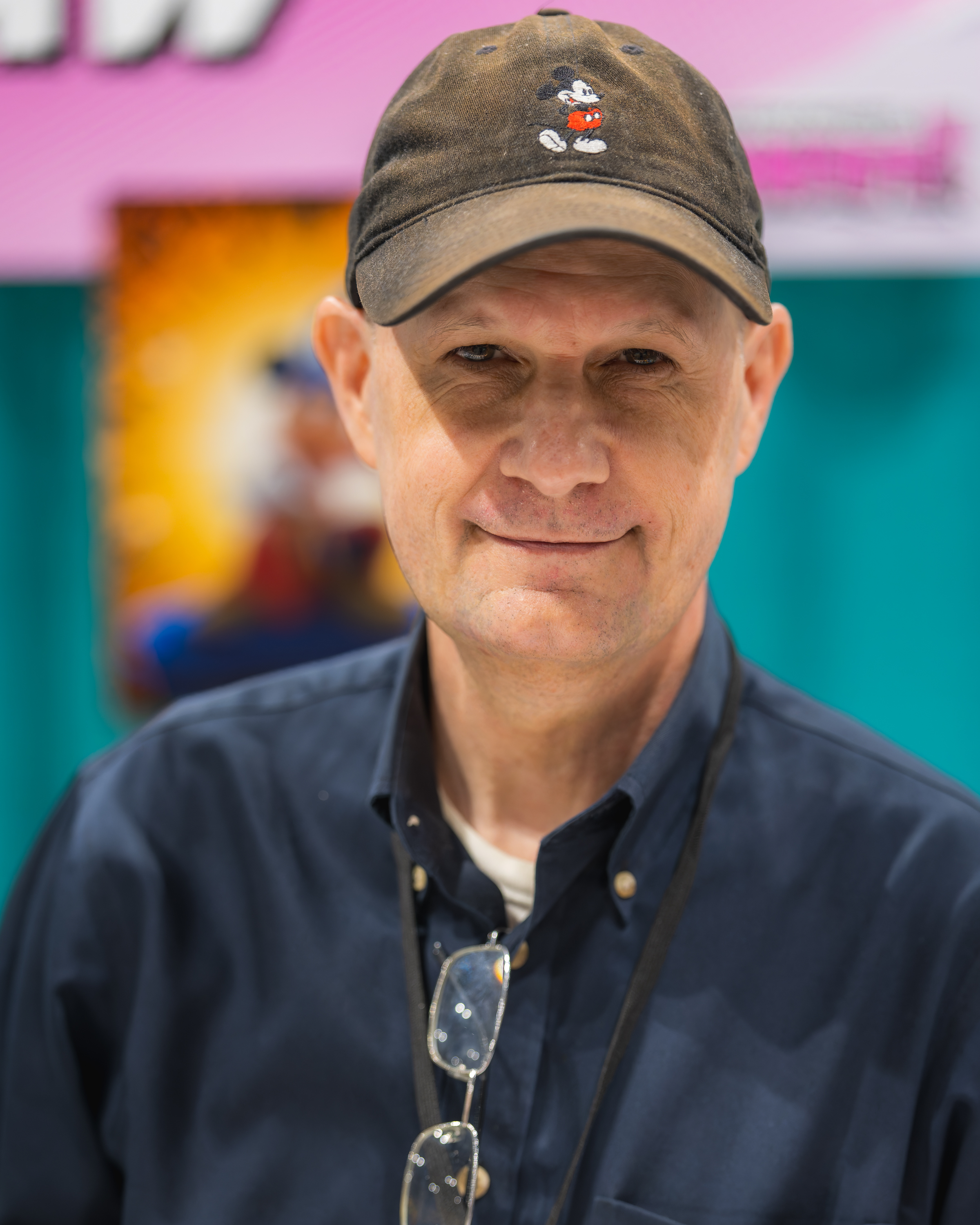
- Rick Law at Animate! Orlando in 2026
- Born: December 15, 1969 (age 56); Maryland, U.S.
- Occupations: Illustrator, producer
- Years active: 1987-present

Rick Law (born December 15, 1969) is an American entertainment illustrator and producer, best known for his career with The Walt Disney Company. His work has spanned across all forms of popular entertainment media: films, TV, music, theme park, print, toys, and video games.

== Early life ==
Law was born in Maryland, and had a turbulent early childhood, before moving at age 11 with his family to Salinas, California, where he attended Salinas High School and graduated a year and 1/2 early. As a 15 year old, Law created a t-shirt design that caught the attention of music artist Steve Taylor and won Law a record company promotion. In 1986, at age 16, Law first attended San Diego Comic-Con where he was further inspired by other artists and creators he met there.

== Career ==
Law's first professional job came at age 17, designing logos for a real estate company. Law's previous interaction with Taylor and his record company, eventually led Law to additional opportunities in creating art and working with others in the music industry including Amy Grant, MTV, Arista Records, Tower Records, Mariah Carey, The Choir and Pat Boone.

Law's early efforts at producing included arranging concerts for performer Rich Mullins in Salinas. Law was also a founder and created the original logo art for the Spirit West Coast music festival in Monterey, CA.

Law's initial foray into Hollywood came about during a 1988 trip to Los Angeles with a friend. Seeking a way to sneak into the Paramount Pictures movie studio became a chance encounter with director Richard Donner who allowed Law permission to visit his Scrooged set and access to the studio lot.

In 1989 Law was a consultant for The Arsenio Hall Show. One of his observations on the initial shows' studio audience was to highlight those audience members who had less than optimal seating. The result was the creation of the recurrent "Dog Pound" comedy bit.

Law's first movie poster design was for the 1992 Paramount Pictures film Leap of Faith starring Steve Martin.

In 1995 Law created the supernatural themed black & white comic series Beyond the Veil, both writing and illustrating the series.

In 1996, Law illustrated Pond and Stream : Habitats ISBN 1557995680 for children's educational publisher Evan-Moor.

Law began working with The Walt Disney Company in 1993. Over the course of his diverse career as a content creator with the company he has held a variety of roles. Law created cover art for a number of the studio's video, DVD, & Blu-Ray releases. Some of those include: The Adventures of Ichabod and Mr. Toad; The Lion King II: Simba's Pride; Mulan; The Rescuers Down Under; 101 Dalmatians; Tinker Bell; Piglet's Big Movie; Winnie the Pooh: Springtime with Roo; Tarzan & Jane; Mickey's Once Upon a Christmas, and the first three 'Buddies' films: Air Buddies, Snow Buddies, and Space Buddies. He has been a story contributor; and created or developed a myriad of products for the company and it's licensees. In 2009, Law started designing toys with his reinterpretations of Disney characters via toy manufacturer MINDstyle. In support of the release of Toy Story 3 in Asia, Law was a primary artist for the Alien Invasion Tour, which debuted at Times Square mall in Hong Kong, with artistic reinterpretations of the Toy Story alien character. Law was a creative lead in the design and launch of Disney English and was a consultant in the development of Shanghai Disneyland Park. As Creative Manager for Disney Learning, his responsibilities involved animation direction and creative oversight of all educational products globally, such as the first series designed for communicatively challenged children. In 2013, he was responsible for the creation of the Disney I Classici collectible trading card set with licensee Conad distributed throughout Italy.

He's been instrumental in fostering projects respective of both animation and the Disney legacy including the documentary Floyd Norman: An Animated Life, and exhibitions including the Walt Disney Family Museum exhibit: Awaking Beauty: The Art of Eyvind Earle.

As an independent producer, Law was an Associate Producer of the films: Drew: The Man Behind the Poster; Blue Like Jazz; Leonard Knight: A Man & His Mountain; and Executive Producer of the rock album Goliath by Steve Taylor & The Perfect Foil. In 2017, Law created cover artwork for the King Never World War I themed EP All These Things and in 2020 he created cover artwork for the band's single Stick In The Mud.

Law has been a speaker at venues including The Walt Disney Family Museum, CTN Animation Expo, and San Diego Comic-Con. He is a member of the Comic Art Professional Society (CAPS) and has served as a board member of The Society of Illustrators of Los Angeles.

== Filmography ==
Year	Title	Credits
1992	Leap of Faith	poster artist
1993	Fearless	production assistant (uncredited)
1998	The Black Cauldron	illustrator
1998	Lion King II: Simba's Pride	illustrator
1999	Madeline: Lost in Paris	illustrator
1999	Mickey's Once Upon a Christmas	illustrator
1999	101 Dalmatians	illustrator
1999	The Adventures of Ichabod and Mr. Toad	illustrator
2000	The Rescuers Down Under	illustrator
2002	Tarzan & Jane	illustrator
2002	Disney Sing-Along-Songs: Very Merry Christmas Songs	illustrator
2003	Piglet's Big Movie	illustrator
2004	Winnie The Pooh: Springtime With Roo	illustrator
2006	Air Buddies	concept illustrator
2006	United 93	special thanks
2008	Tinker Bell	concept artist
2008	Snow Buddies	concept illustrator
2009	Space Buddies	concept artist
2012	Raiding The Lost Ark: A Filmumentary	special thanks
2012	Blue Like Jazz	associate producer
2013	Drew: The Man Behind the Poster	associate producer
2015	Leonard Knight: A Man & His Mountain	associate producer
2015	17th Annual Animation Show of Shows	special thanks
2015	Tyrus	special thanks
2016	Floyd Norman: An Animated Life	consultant
2016	18th Annual Animation Show of Shows	special thanks
2017	19th Annual Animation Show of Shows	special thanks

== Television ==
Year	Title	Credits
1989	The Arsenio Hall Show	creative consultant
1990	CCM-TV	creative consultant/idea
1990	The Gospel According to VH1	idea
1992	Melrose Place	illustrator - multiple episodes
1993	Danger Theatre	conceptual illustrator
1994	The 29th Annual Academy of Country Music Awards	Illustrator
1995	The 700 Club	himself

== Discography ==
Year	Title	Artist	Credits
1994	Speckled Bird	The Choir	Thanks/project support
2014	Goliath	Steve Taylor & The Perfect Foil	Executive Producer
2017	All These Things	King Never	cover artist
2020	Stick In the Mud	King Never	cover artist

== Games ==
Year	Title	Credits
2009	Prototype	concept artist
