= King Never =

Progressive rock band

- King Never performing in 2014; Left to right: Karl Lane, Nick Baranski, and Matt McCabe.

Background information
- Origin: Chico, California, USA
- Genres: Progressive rock, alternative rock, ambient
- Years active: 1995–present
- Labels: Marathon Records, Independent
- Members: Matt McCabe; Nick Baranski; Jordan Reading
- Past members: Karl Lane; Scott Gontjes
- Website: kingnever.com

King Never is a rock band influenced by ambient, new wave, and progressive rock, based in Loomis, California. Founded by Matt McCabe (vocals, guitar) in 1995, the band has undergone different formations and member changes throughout its history.

== History ==
Founded in 1995, and influenced by 80s new wave and progressive rock such as The Police, King Crimson, and The Fixx, King Never originally began as an outlet for Matt McCabe's explorations on guitar with real-time looping techniques.

King Never's debut album Ambient Guitar Noise: Volume 1, featuring 10 tracks, was recorded live in studio by McCabe over the course of a week and released by Marathon Records in 2000.

2004's Marathon Records release of Orphans, Misfits & Fragments, a full length 11 track album, incorporated more collaborators into the mix with McCabe and the additional talents of Greg Asher, Jeff Elbel, and Kristy McCabe.

Lullabies & Sleepless Nights (Ambient Guitar Noise: Volume 2), was a return to form, featuring 10 tracks, again wholly recorded by McCabe live in studio with no overdubbing, released by Marathon Records in 2007.

From March 2009 into December 2010, McCabe hosted the King Never Podcast in which he discussed recording what became the album Possibilities.

In May 2010, the concept album Possibilities was released, which chronicles the fictional character "Sonja" through a steampunk inspired world on a journey of self-discovery and spiritual awakening. The character was inspired by aspects of Fydor Dostoevsky's Crime and Punishment and Mary Shelley's Frankenstein. This album included contributors Jake Wood (drums), and Kristy McCabe (vocals), with cover art by Nemo. This was the first independent release by the band. In April 2012 music videos for The City and Gravity, both directed by Gerald Benesch were released via the King Never official YouTube channel.

A single, We Three Kings was released in November 2010. This track included Jordan Reading on bass, Evan Parandes on drums, and Kristy McCabe once again providing backing vocals. Cover artwork by Sue McCabe. Jeff Elbel is credited with special thanks for lending a critical ear.

King Never had slowly morphed over time into a "full band" studio project with many guest collaborators including Able Cain alumni Greg Asher and Jordan Reading, Jeff Elbel (Ping, Farewell To Juliet), Jake Wood (Super Adventure Club), Evan Parandes, and Kristy McCabe.

In May 2012, King Never developed a consistent line-up. At the cajoling of McCabe's co-worker to audition his brother, McCabe met bassist Karl Lane. After a handful of auditions, Drummer Scott Gontjes was soon added to the lineup. The trio began playing gigs in the Sacramento area and over time throughout the Bay area and Northern California.

In the spring of 2013, the band would release the EP 37, consisting of 5 tracks. In July 2014, an official lyric music video for the track Mr. No was released on the band's official YouTube channel.

Shortly after releasing the EP 37, drummer Gontjes unexpectedly chose to exit the band to pursue other projects. McCabe and Lane auditioned other drummers, but it was the suggestion of another co-worker that his brother-in-law played drums, that led the duo to Nick Baranski. Baranski became King Never's new drummer.

Sadly, after a short battle with cancer, on August 11, 2014, bassist Karl Lane died. Lane's bass playing appears on 37 and All These Things.

In November 2015, McCabe's long time friend, Jordan Reading, was recruited to play bass with the band.

The 3 track concept EP All These Things, a reflection on World War I, was released on Memorial Day May 29, 2017. The EP features the McCabe, Lane, and Baranski lineup, with cover art by Rick Law.

In March 2020, the band released their single Stick In The Mud with the now familiar line-up of McCabe, Reading, and Baranski. The single includes the lyric of the nursery rhyme Shoo Fly, Don't Bother Me.

The band's name King Never derives from a passage of Fydor Dostoevsky's novel Crime and Punishment. A returning theme for the band is Dostoevsky's Crime and Punishment and Mary Shelley's Frankenstein. In an early 2000 Popup interview with clubknowledge.com McCabe cited being inspired by the works. Those themes were also inspirational in the band's 2010 release Possibilities.

== Discography ==
- Ambient Guitar Noise: Volume 1 released June 1, 2000 by Marathon Records
- Orphans, Misfits & Fragments released October 1, 2004 by Marathon Records
- Lullabies & Sleepless Nights (Ambient Guitar Noise: Volume 2) released: January 1, 2007 by Marathon Records
- Possibilities released May 17, 2010
- "We Three Kings" (single) released November 23, 2010 (Re-mixed and re-mastered in 2014)
- 37 released April 24, 2013 (re-mixed and re-mastered in 2016)
- All These Things released May 29, 2017
- "Stick in the Mud" (single) released March 16, 2020
- "World Gone Quiet" (single) released October 5, 2020

== Reviews ==
In a 2005 review of Orphans, Misfits & Fragments, Brian Baker of Amplifier Magazine wrote:

King Never has been around in various forms for nearly a decade. The band was launched by guitarist Matt McCabe in the mid'90s as an experiment in realtime looping and ambient/rock genre blending. Orphans, Misfits & Fragments is only King Never's second full album in its ten year history, and it's clear from the finished product that McCabe has spent a great deal of time painstakingly assembling the album's evocative and entrancing content. McCabe's ambient looping creates a cerebral texture that serves as a soft foundation for his more traditional rock song structures and visceral and sinewy guitar flights. The result is an atmospheric blend of Brian Eno's dreamy meanderings and the prog/pop guitar tension of King Crimson's Robert Fripp and Adrian Belew.

Lullabies and Sleeplesss Nights (Ambient Guitar Noise: Volume 2) was released January 1, 2007. AmbientMusicGuide.com said about the release: "I don't know whether "purist" is the word but Californian ambient guitarist King Never takes pride in choosing the riskier path of recording his tracks live, with no further editing or overdubs. With his electric guitar, effects and loop machines he creates a seductive and surprisingly broad palate of nocturnal sounds on Lullabies And Sleepless Nights. It's beatless and mostly gentle, shifting between tonal and slightly dissonant. There's the odd burst of jagged distortion just in case, I presume, you've nodded off too early. This is often impressive and eerily beautiful stuff and not just for guitar fans by any means. Rating 3.5/5."

Of the album Possibilities released May 17, 2010 Downthelinezine.com said: "If you like music in that arena of alternative rock, you will also like this album."

In a review of 37 for Prognaut.com, Joseph Shingler "Recommended for fans of 80s' alternative rock." and noted: "The music is influenced by bands like Police, The Fixx, Nirvana, Smashing Pumpkins, and 'Radiohead; and even some of the later period albums from the band Spirit can be detected in tracks like “Push And Pull” and “Mr. No”. For the most part the accessible compositions are sedate melancholy ballads; a bit on the short side, but with an infectious hook. Solid songwriting."

Jeff Elbel wrote of 37: "Fans of crafty electric guitar and bands like Porcupine Tree, Belew-era King Crimson and The Police will want to check out this King Never EP. It's a straight-shooting representation of what this tightly-knit trio can do on stage. Until I get the chance to see it happen in Chicago, I'll be spinning 37. I’ve been a fan of Matt McCabe's playing and songwriting an embarrassingly long amount of time, but for good reason. This set finds him making yet another forward push against the boundaries."

About All These Things Matt Crosslin of Downthelinezine.com wrote: "I can hear everything from early U2 to emo in each song, all blended cleverly into a coherent whole. The only problem with this is the length: only three songs leaves you wanting more. But the three songs you get pack quite a punch."
