= Fear of God (Deitiphobia album) =

Studio album by Deitiphobia
- Released: 1991
- Recorded: August 1991
- Studio: at
- Genre: EBM, industrial
- Length: 59:32
- Label: Blonde Vinyl
- Producer: Deitiphobia

Deitiphobia chronology
Digital Priests (1990)	Fear of God (1991)	Digital Priests - the Remixes (1992)

Alternative cover
- 1998 reissue album cover

Professional ratings
Review scores
Source	Rating
AllMusic	3/5 stars

Fear of God is the first official studio album by industrial band Deitiphobia, who had been known as Donderfliegen up until that time. It was originally released in late 1991 by Blonde Vinyl. The album was later reissued in 1998 by Flaming Fish Music, alongside a reissue of Digital Priests - the Remixes. The reissue features three additional tracks, and two of the tracks from the original release are merged.

== Track listing ==
All songs written, programmed and performed by Deitiphobia.

=== Original release ===
1. "Crucifixion of Will" – 3:29
2. "My Sins are Gone" – 0:05
3. "Tripizoidal" – 0:58
4. "SPILL!" – 5:15
5. "Architekt = X" – 3:51
6. "Digital Symphony Opus 1" – 0:21
7. "Dancing Messiah" – 5:04
8. "Communion" – 4:30
9. "Ethereal Worship Sequence" – 0:57
10. "A.O.G." – 4:39
11. "Jesu Christe Network" – 0:19
12. "Altitude 0" – 4:06
13. "Target: Humanity" – 4:27
14. "Lost in Light" – 0:12
15. "I Tore the Sky" – 3:25
16. "Liars and Fools" – 4:41
17. "A.O.G.L.X.E.M.I.X" – 7:03
18. "Architekt = X" (Sigma 7 Mix) – 6:10

=== 1998 reissue ===
"Tripzoidal" includes "My Sins are Gone", which was a separate track on the original issue.

1. "Crucifixion of Will" – 3:31
2. "Tripizoidal" – 1:01
3. "SPILL!" – 5:15
4. "Architekt = X" – 3:51
5. "Digital Symphony Opus 1" – 0:21
6. "Dancing Messiah" – 5:04
7. "Communion" – 4:29
8. "Ethereal Worship Sequence" – 0:57
9. "A.O.G." – 4:38
10. "Jesu Christe Network" – 0:19
11. "Altitude 0" – 4:06
12. "Target: Humanity" – 4:26
13. "Lost in Light" – 0:12
14. "I Tore the Sky" – 3:25
15. "Liars and Fools" – 4:40
16. "A.O.G.L.X.E.M.I.X" – 7:03
17. "Architekt = X" (Sigma 7 Mix) – 6:09
18. "Crucifixion of Will" (DEITIdemo) – 5:09
19. "My Jesus is Real" (Phobia vs. MC White-E) – 5:27
20. "I Tore the Sky" (DEITIdemo) – 3:29

== Personnel ==
- Wally Shaw – vocals, keyboards, percussion
- Brent Stackhouse – vocals, programming
- Heather Stackhouse – vocals on the song "Communion"
- Alexei the Russian – vocals on the song "A.O.G.L.X.E.M.I.X"
- Jay Allen - art direction
- Deann Schreibert - photography

=== 1998 reissue ===
- MC White-E – vocals on the song "My Jesus is Real" (Phobia vs. MC White-E)
- Carson Pierce – executive producer
- Brian C. Janes – remastering
- Ed Finkler – artwork, layout
