= Ambient Guitar Noise: Volume 1 =

Studio album by King Never
- Released: June 1, 2000
- Recorded: Eclectic Garage Studios (Chico, CA)
- Genre: Electronic, ambient
- Length: 41:25
- Label: Marathon Records
- Producer: Matt McCabe

King Never chronology
Ambient Guitar Noise: Volume 1 (2000)	Orphans, Misfits & Fragments (2004)

Ambient Guitar Noise: Volume 1 is the debut studio album of ambient, experimental guitar loop compositions by Matthew McCabe in a first recording as King Never. Recorded live in the studio over the course of one week, the album was released by Marathon Records on June 1, 2000

== Background ==
Influenced by 80s new wave and progressive rock such as The Police, King Crimson, and The Fixx, King Never originally began as an outlet for Matt McCabe's explorations on guitar with real-time audio feedback techniques. The album was recorded live in studio with no overdubs.

== Track listing ==
1. Handshake – :24
2. Loop 2 – 4:51
3. Loop 3 – 4:35
4. Loop 4 – 2:10
5. Loop 5 – 3:07
6. Loop 6 – 5:29
7. Loop 7 – 5:16
8. Loop 8 – 7:31
9. Loop 9 – 2:27
10. End Loop – 5:36

== Production notes ==
- Matt McCabe: Guitar
- Mixed at Back Room Studios, Chico, CA on April 27, 1996 by Loren Alldrin and Matt McCabe
- Mastered at [Finley Sound], Roseville, CA from May 27 to May 29, 2000 by Matt McCabe.
- Produced by Matt McCabe
- Art direction and design by Jeff Elbel
- Photography by Matt McCabe
