= Massivivid =

American christian band (1996–2003)

- Origin: Champaign, Illinois
- Years active: 1996–2003
- Spinoff of: Deitiphobia

Massivivid was a Christian band founded by Wally Shaw and Mark Nash. Their sound was based in industrial rock and electronic pop, but with a hard edge and intensity similar to that of Nine Inch Nails or The Smashing Pumpkins. Massivivid was founded as a live side project to Deitiphobia. Their album BrightBlur was released to critical acclaim and was awarded Hard Music Album of the Year at the 30th GMA Dove Awards.

== Background ==
The band was born in 1996 as a project of Michael Knott's record label Ear Candy. They produced an EP that year and held their first show at the 1997 Cornerstone Festival.

After producing a demo for the label they were picked up by Tattoo Records and produced their first album, BrightBlur. The name of the album refers to a line in C. S. Lewis's Letters to Malcolm where Lewis describes God as a "bright blur becoming brighter and blurier [sic]". Several other Lewis references appear on the album: to The Space Trilogy in "Deep Heaven", and quotes from Mere Christianity in "Unmade". Lyrically BrightBlur is centered on the struggles faced by humanity, specifically the contrasts that technology introduces to society. The album propelled Massivivid to take the 1998 Dove Award for "Hard Music Album."

The band toured heavily throughout 1999. The follow-up record, Dressed To The Nines...Armed To The Teeth, was released in 2002 on Accidental Sirens, an indie label partially owned by Allan Aguirre of Scaterd Few. A review in HM Magazine was heavily critical of the album, stating that its "fuzz-tone guitar based electro industrial" sound had at best the quality of a demo.

One of the songs on BrightBlur, Gripped, would appear as one of the songs in the OST for the video game, SCORE International Baja 1000.

== Discography ==
- 1999: BrightBlur (Tattoo Records, Reviews: Cross Rhythms, 7ball, YouthWorker)
- 2002: Dressed To The Nines... Armed To The Teeth (Accidental Sirens, Review: HM Magazine)

== Members ==
- Sheri Shaw
- Wally Shaw
- Mark Nash
- John Hogan
- Wil Foster
- Tom Wilson
- Bob Carlton
- Jesse Davis
- Jason Scott
- Keith Konečnik
