= Possibilities (King Never album) =

Studio album by King Never
- Released: May 17, 2010
- Recorded: Finley Sound
- Genre: Alternative rock, progressive rock, ambient
- Length: 27:50
- Label: King Never

King Never chronology
Lullabies & Sleepless Nights (Ambient Guitar Noise: Volume 2) (2017)	Possibilities (2010)	37 (2013)

Possibilities is the fourth studio album by King Never. A concept album that is a mix of ambient, alternative, and progressive rock songs that chronicle a fictional character of "Sonja" thru a steam punk inspired world. Released on May 17, 2010.

== Background ==
After revisiting the pure ambient music explorations in 2007's Lullabies & Sleepless Nights (Ambient Guitar Noise: Volume 2), McCabe uses collaborators again for this high concept album which borrows inspiration from Fyodor Dostoevsky's Crime and Punishment and Mary Shelley's Frankenstein. This would be the first independent release for the band.

From March 2009 into December 2010, McCabe hosted the King Never Podcast in which he chronicled the recording of what became the album Possibilities.

In April 2012 music videos for The City and Gravity, both directed by Gerald Benesch were released via the King Never official YouTube channel.

== Reception ==
Downthelinezine.com said: "If you like music in that arena of alternative rock, you will also like this album."

== Track listing ==
1. Introduction – 2:34
2. The City – 3:06
3. Hotel Desolation – 2:57
4. Possibilities – 1:22
5. Gravity – 4:07
6. Sorrow – 3:26
7. Down Low – 3:54
8. Believe – 3:19
9. All Is Well That Ends Well – 3:05

== Production notes ==
Released May 17, 2010.
Matt McCabe: vocals, guitars, guitar loops/textures, bass, minimal keyboards and incidental cymbals
Kristy McCabe: background vocals
Jake Wood: drums
Recorded, mixed and mastered by Matt McCabe at Finley Sound. Jake Wood's drums recorded by Jake Wood.
Original cover art by Nemo.
