= Dan Donovan (guitarist) =

British musician

Dan Donovan is a British singer, songwriter, and guitar player. Born in 1960 to a Welsh preacher, he produces music which uses metaphor extensively to draw on spiritual themes.

== Career ==
His music career began with a band called Back to Jordan which only recorded one EP and one album. Then he founded the band Tribe of Dan, described on the King Kool website as "cult greb goth outfit" and elsewhere as "swamp rock". The band split after recording only one studio album, and their US label folded shortly after their first release. Following this event he released albums independently, and his sound shifted toward an acoustic feel.

Recently he has been involved with several small bands. From 2005, he has worked using the name "King Kool", described as baseless blues - the band features Donovan and a drummer, but no bassist. The original drummer was Matt Middleton, who had worked with Donovan in several bands, including Tribe of Dan. For the second album, the drummer was Joe Mason, and subsequently Pas Struthers.

== Discography ==
=== As Back to Jordan ===
- 1986: self titled (1986, UK - independent release)
- 1987: Voice In The Wilderness (1987, UK - Tunnel Records)

=== With Tribe of Dan ===
- 1990: Git Down, Thrash It: Live (Review: Cross Rhythms)
- 1992: Shook Up Shook Up (US - Blonde Vinyl)
- 1998: The Bootus Red (Mister M Records, Reviews: The Phantom Tollbooth, Cross Rhythms)

=== With The Swamp Cranks ===
- 1994: Swamp Cranks: The Tapes (Review: Cross Rhythms)
- 1996: Yew (Review: Cross Rhythms)

=== Solo ===
- 1993: TrashboneThang (1993, Sticky Music)
- 1995: Dust Shaker (1995, Review: Cross Rhythms)
- 199?: Root (cassette only release)
- 1998: The Leaven Dell (1998, Review: The Phantom Tollbooth)
- 2000: The Hex The Ghears (2000, Review: The Phantom Tollbooth)
- 2003: Ga-rage

=== As King Kool ===
- 2005: Roken (US - CD Baby)
- 2007: Yeah Yeah Liberté
- 2010: Vampin
- 2014: Scuzz Bombe
