= Delta-S =

American Christian Industrial/trance band

- Promotional image for Delta-S second album, Voyage to Isis. From left to right: Lucien, Nicki Tedesco, Lyte, Tony Bandos, DJ Amanda Jones.

Background information
- Origin: Camarillo, California, United States
- Genres: Industrial, trance
- Years active: 1995–present
- Label: WindM Records (2005–present)
- Members: Lyte; Lucien; Colleen Kelly; DJ Amanda Jones; Nicki Tedesco; Tony Bandos
- Past members: Moe; Jim Prosser
- Website: www.thedeltasproject.com

Delta-S is a Christian industrial/progressive trance band formed in Camarillo, California, United States in 1995. Band members currently include Lyte, who writes and produces a bulk of the work, and Lucien, who tests the material's emotional value and authenticity.

== History ==
Delta-S was initially formed in 1995 by artists Moe and Lyte, under the name Entropy. Later that year, the band changed their name to Delta-S. The name refers to a change in entropy (Delta So), and conceptually refers to the band's attempts at speeding up, slowing down, or stopping the process of entropy in the listener. In 1996, Jim Prosser joined the band. Work began on the production of their first album, including some collaboration with the band Calcutta and artists Duke and Joshua Vosper. The album was never released, and Delta-S disbanded in 1998.

After disbanding, Lyte continued the project as a solo effort. In 1999, production for the second Delta-S album, And Sometimes..., began. This album was also unreleased. In 2000, the band adopted a new member, Lucien, and work started on a third album, Chasm. This was released as the band's debut album in March 2005, under a created record label entitled WindM Records, titled Chasm (Volume 0). The album was later re-released as Chasm (Volume 1) in May that year.

The band released a second album, Voyage to Isis, in December 2007. The album featured several guest vocalists including Kirsty Hawkshaw and Sheri Shaw of Deitiphobia.

The band's third album, The Mortal Veil, was released on October 31, 2015. This was followed by the extended plays Lost in You, featuring Jennifer Lauren (Emoiryah) and released on October 31, 2017, and Coven, released on December 22, 2017.

== Band members ==
- Brian "Lyte" Judy – vocals, keys, guitar
- Robert "Lucien" Morris – guitar, vocals
- Colleen Kelly – vocals
- DJ Amanda Jones – vocals
- Nicki Tedesco – bass, upright bass, vocals, guitar
- Tony Bandos – drums

=== Former members ===
- Michael "Moe" Masingale
- Jim Prosser

=== Collaborators ===
- Kirsty Hawkshaw
- Christina Novelli
- Pamela Vain
- DJ Type 41
- Lauren Edman
- Sheri Shaw
- Nikki Williams
- Michelle Averna
- Ever
- Anguidara
- Tranquil Chaos
- David Pataconi
- Emoiryah
- LAKE

== Discography ==
- Chasm (2005, WindM Records)
- Voyage to Isis (2007, WindM Records)
- The Mortal Veil (2015, WindM Records)
- Lost in You (2017, WindM Records)
- Mirror Dimension Series Vol. 1: Coven (2017, WindM Records)

=== Compilation appearances ===
- Automata 9.0 (2006, Flaming Fish) – "Rage Into Blindness"
- Automata 10.0 (2006, Flaming Fish) – "Tempest"

=== Remixes ===
- 2007: Celldweller – "Frozen" (Fade to Grey Mix by Delta-S)
- 2007: Celldweller – "Frozen" (Anomaly Mix by Delta-S)

=== Collaborations ===
- 2014: Delta-S & Christina Novelli – "Alive"
