= Breakfast with Amy =

American Christian alternative rock band

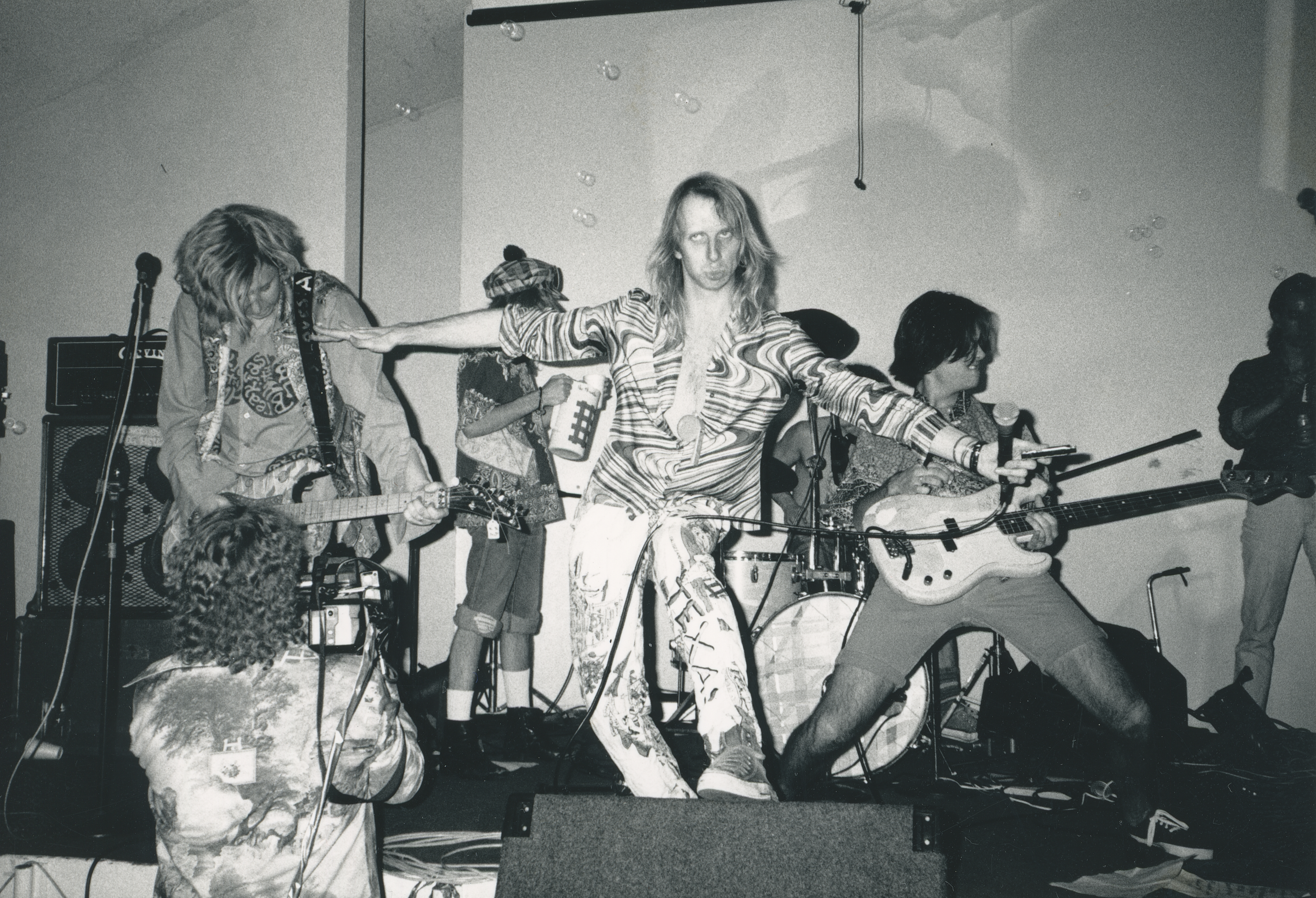
- Breakfast with Amy live at Rock of the West

Background information
- Origin: La Habra, California
- Genre: Christian alternative rock
- Years active: 1986–1992
- Labels: Narrowpath, Blonde Vinyl, Flying Tart
- Past members: David Koval; Bob "Edwin" Wohler; Chris Colbert; Caryn Parker Colbert; Paul Pellegrin; Jeff "Tennessee Beans" Beahn; Jeremy Woods; Charlotte Stripland; Rich Berger
- Website: breakfastwithamy.tripod.com

Breakfast with Amy was an American Christian alternative rock band, formed in 1986 in La Habra, California at the La Habra Four-Square church. At that time, the band consisted of vocalist David Koval, bassist Jeff "Tennessee Beans" Beahn, guitarist Christopher Colbert, and drummer Paul Pellegrin. The pastor of the church was throwing a Saturday night concert. A band had backed out and he needed a replacement. David, Christopher, Paul and Jeff quickly formed "Friends of Amy" to perform.

The band was later joined by Caryn Barker on guitar and Charlotte Stripland on bass. Charlotte was replaced in 1989 by Bob "Edwin" Wohler. Brothers Eric and Jeremy Wood filled in on Bass and Drums respectively during the final days of the band.

The band initially released an independent 4-track recording as a demo tape in 1987. It featured three songs (Funeral, Ferris Wheel and Love Song) and was recorded at Half Moon Studio by engineer Dan Bush. For the demo, the line-up featured Rich Berger on Drums. In 1988 the band released a professionally recorded demo tape (see side B of the Narrowpath release).

In 1989, Breakfast with Amy was approached by Greg Sostrom of Narrowpath Records and subsequently signed by him in 1990. This led to the formal release of their studio album Everything Was Beautiful and Nothing Hurt. The album was recorded at Casbah Recording Studio in Fullerton, California during two sessions about a year apart. The A side featured new material recorded at the time the band signed with Narrowpath Records of Concord, California. It was produced by Chaz Ramierez, known for his work in the Orange County New Wave and Punk scenes. The B side featured their first studio tracks (previously sold at concerts). After limited release through Narrowpath (suffering from payment and accounting problems with their distributor) the band signed with Michael Knott's Blonde Vinyl Records in 1991.

With a new label that could better represent the band's progressive music and image, Breakfast with Amy quickly moved to the forefront of the underground Christian rock scene that had been taking shape in Orange County - Southern California since the early 80's. During the short lifespan of Blonde Vinyl, Breakfast with Amy released 2 studio albums. After the collapse of Blonde Vinyl Records (due to Spectra Distribution, Inc. filing for bankruptcy) the band dissolved. In 1995, they released their final album (a live compilation), Live At The Hawleywould Bowl!, under Flying Tart Records featuring a compilation of live performances from throughout their career. The band never found a mainstream audience in or out of Christian circles.

In 1995, Gray Dot records re-released the first Breakfast With Amy album featuring re-mastered tracks and three bonus demo tracks (from their original demo). Breakfast with Amy is remembered by fans of the fledgling alternative Christian rock scene as one of the staples of Blonde Vinyl Records, being present on nearly all of their compilation CDs (as well as other alternative Christian rock compilations) and being one of only a few artists on the label to make a music video.

As the band evolved, their live performances became outlandish stage shows. Typical performances featured costumed band members, Go go dancing, flaming taxidermy, and movie projectors used as stage lighting. Shows often ended with instrument destruction and a wall of feedback. Due to these factors, the band was rarely invited back to a venue (be it a club or a church).

The band is often described as Post-punk, mixing elements of Psychedelic rock, Art rock, and Punk rock. During live performances, many songs were performed as long jams with the vocalist improvising on pop culture references. Some songs have Pop music melodies, while other songs feature layers of guitar dissonance and feedback. Band musical influences include U2, Echo & the Bunnymen, Sonic Youth, The Who, The Ramones, The Sex Pistols and The New York Dolls.

== Members ==
Band members

- David Koval — vocals, electric sitar, acoustic guitar, bass, keyboards, mandolin
- Jeff "Tennessee Beans" Beahn - bass guitar
- Charlotte Stripland - bass guitar
- Bob "Edwin" Wohler — bass guitar
- Eric Wood - bass guitar
- Christopher "Chrissy" Colbert — guitar
- Caryn Colbert — guitar
- Rich Berger - drums
- Paul Pellegrin — drums
- Jeremy Wood - drums

Stage hands

- Christopher "Mr. Rhumba" Rumbaugh - Team captain and babysitter (band manager)
- Nathan Pellegrin - Projectionist
- Trish the Dish - Go Go dancer
- LaLa Nellie - Go Go dancer
- Beth - Go Go dancer
- Gina - Go Go dancer
- Sonja - Go Go dancer
- Margaret the Bubble Girl
- Happy Fun Clown- Ken Bower (VP of Voice of Youth)

== Discography ==
=== Studio albums ===
- Everything Was Beautiful and Nothing Hurt (1990)
- Dad (1991)
- Love Gift (1992)

=== Live albums ===
- Live At The Hawleywould Bowl! (1995)

=== Compilations ===
- Blonde Vinyl Teaser II: Food for Thought (1991)
- Radioactive Hits: The Definitive Blonde Vinyl Collection (1993)
- Live Long and Perspire: Sub Tart Vol. 1 (1995)
- Afters (1997)
- Toast and Olive. "Friends of Tomorrow" (1998)

=== Videos ===
- Me (music video)
- The Sound of One Hand Snacking [unreleased mockudrama]

=== Other ===
- Breakfast with Amy (custom demo)
- Everything Was Beautiful and Nothing Hurt (custom demo)
- Tuck in Your Love Gift [unreleased album from Vox Vinyl] (1991)
- Everything Was Beautiful and Nothing Hurt [reissue] (gray dot #gdr 9503CD) (1995)

== See also ==
- Blonde Vinyl Records
