= Christian rock =

Rock music with lyrics related to Jesus and Christianity

- Stylistic origins: Rock music; Jesus music; Christian music
- Cultural origins: Late 1960s, United States

Subgenres
- Christian alternative rock; Christian metal; Christian punk; Christian hardcore

Other topics
- Christian hip-hop; Contemporary Christian music; Christian electronic dance music

Christian rock is a genre of rock music that features lyrics focusing on matters of Christian faith, often with an emphasis on Jesus. The extent to which their lyrics are explicitly Christian varies between bands. Many bands who perform Christian rock have ties to the contemporary Christian music labels, media outlets, and festivals, while other bands are independent.

In the 1990s and 2000s, Tooth & Nail Records became a catalyst in legitimizing Christian rock as a notable subgenre of alternative rock. Signing acts like Starflyer 59 and MxPx, Tooth & Nail helped make alternative rock immediately accessible within evangelical church communities throughout the United States, and subsequently the wider Western world with the advent of music streaming.

In the 2000s and onwards, Christian rock bands Kutless, Red, Skillet, and Thousand Foot Krutch along with VS Reforged were influenced by acts like Linkin Park to develop their own sounds that combined hard rock and nu metal. Skillet received Grammy nominations for two albums, along with having two albums certified platinum and double platinum. Red also received Grammy nominations for two albums.

== History ==
=== Christian response to early rock music (1950s–1960s) ===
Most traditional and fundamentalist Christians did not view rock music favorably when it became popular with young people from the 1950s, even though country and gospel music often influenced early rock music. In 1952, Archibald Davison, a Harvard professor, summed up the sound of traditional Christian music and why its supporters might not like rock music when he wrote of "... a rhythm that avoids strong pulses; a melody whose physiognomy is neither so characteristic nor so engaging as to make an appeal in its own behalf; counterpoint, which cultivates long-breathed eloquence rather than instant and dramatic effect; a chromaticism which is at all times restricted in amount and lacking in emotionalism; and modality which creates an atmosphere unmistakably ecclesiastical". In the light of Archibald Davison's characterisation it is easy to see how different these two genres of music are. Christians in the United States did not want their children exposed to music with unruly, impassioned vocals, loud guitar-riffs and jarring, hypnotic rhythms. Rock and roll differed from the norm, and thus it was seen by them as a threat. Often the music was overtly sexual in nature, as in the case of Elvis Presley, who became controversial and massively popular partly for his suggestive stage antics and dancing. However, "Elvis" was a religious person who released a gospel album: Peace in the Valley in 1957. Individual Christians may have listened to or even performed rock music in many cases, but conservative church establishments - particularly in the American South - regarded it as anathema.

He Touched Me, a 1972 gospel-music album by Elvis Presley, sold over 1 million copies in the US alone and earned Presley his second of three Grammy Awards. Not counting compilations, it was his third and final album devoted exclusively to gospel music. The song "He Touched Me" was written in 1963 by Bill Gaither, an American singer and songwriter of southern gospel and Contemporary Christian music.

In the 1960s, rock music developed artistically, attained worldwide popularity and became associated with the radical counterculture, firmly alienating many Christians. In 1966 The Beatles, one of the most popular and influential rock-bands of their era, ran into trouble with many of their American fans when John Lennon jokingly offered his opinion that Christianity was dying and that the Beatles were "more popular than Jesus now". The romantic, melodic rock songs of the band's early career had formerly been viewed as relatively inoffensive by Christians, but after the remark, churches nationwide organized Beatles-record burnings and Lennon was forced to apologize. Subsequently, the Beatles and most rock musicians experimented with a more complex, psychedelic style of music that frequently used anti-establishment, drug-related, or sexual lyrics, while The Rolling Stones sang "Sympathy for the Devil" (1968), a song openly written from the point of view of Satan. Allegations of Satanic intent also arose from the Beatles and others of the controversial backmasking recording-technique. This further increased Christian opposition to rock music.

Later, in the 1960s, the escalating Vietnam War, Civil Rights Movement, Paris student riots of 1968 and other events served as catalysts for youth activism and political withdrawal or protest, which became associated with rock bands, whether or not they were openly political. Moreover, many saw the music as promoting a lifestyle of promiscuous "sex, drugs and rock and roll", also reflected in the behavior of many rock stars. However, there was growing recognition of the diverse musical and ideological potential of rock. Countless new bands sprang up in the mid-to-late 1960s, as rock displaced older, smoother pop styles to become the dominant form of pop music, a position it would enjoy almost continuously until the end of the 20th century.

=== Development (mid 1960s–1980s) ===
Among the first bands that played Christian rock was the Crusaders, a Southern Californian garage rock band, whose November 1966 Tower Records album Make a Joyful Noise with Drums and Guitars is considered one of the first gospel rock releases; John Joseph Thompson identifies it as "the first record of Christian rock". Brian Collins characterises Mind Garage as "arguably the first band of its kind": they recorded the 1967 Electric Liturgy at RCA's "Nashville Sound" studio in 1969. Both of these recordings were preceded by the rockabilly praise LP I Like God's Style, written and performed by one 16-year-old Isabel Baker and released on the private Wichita, Kansas Romco label in 1965, which no one published on until the 2000s.

Larry Norman, often described as the "father of Christian rock", and in his later years "the Grandfather of Christian rock", who, in 1969 recorded and released Upon This Rock, "the first commercially released Jesus rock album", challenged a view held by some conservative Christians (predominantly fundamentalists) that rock music was anti-Christian. One of his songs, "Why Should the Devil Have All the Good Music?" summarized his attitude and his quest to pioneer Christian rock music. A cover version of Larry Norman's Rapture-themed "I Wish We'd All Been Ready" appears in the Evangelical Christian feature film A Thief in the Night and appeared on Cliff Richard's Christian album Small Corners along with "Why Should the Devil Have All the Good Music?".

In 1966, the band Žeteoci (transl. The Harvesters) was formed in Yugoslavia. Founded by four students of the Zagreb Catholic Faculty of Theology, Žeteoci performed beat music with religious lyrics, being the first Christian rock band in Yugoslavia and arguably the first Christian rock band in a communist country. Although an openly religious band in a communist state, due to specific political and cultural milieu of the Non-Aligned Yugoslavia, for the most of their career Žeteoci enjoyed the attention of the media and notable popularity among the Yugoslav youth. The band also played a pioneering role on the Yugoslav rock scene in general, as their first and only album, To nije tajna (It Is Not a Secret), released in 1969, was the second full-length album in the history of Yugoslav rock music. They ended their activity in 1971, as the members of the band completed their studies of theology and went on to become priests of the Catholic Church.

Randy Stonehill's "Welcome To Paradise" (1976)

Another Christian rock pioneer, Randy Stonehill, released his first album in 1971, the Larry Norman-produced Born Twice. In the most common pressing of the album, side one is entirely a live performance. Another early Christian rock album was Mylon (We Believe) by Mylon LeFevre, son of members of the southern gospel group The LeFevres. He recorded the album with members of Classics IV and released it through Cotillion Records in 1970. Ocean (Canada) gained gospel pop big hit "Put Your Hand in the Hand" in 1971. Norman Greenbaum and the Doobie Brothers had gospel hits, but they were not Christian rockers. Sister Janet Mead had a gospel hit in 1974.

In the late 1970s, Christian rock received exposure through more mainstream rock and folk rock musicians. Bob Dylan became a born-again Christian and released three albums between 1979 and 1981. This period would yield the Grammy winning single "Gotta Serve Somebody" and three successful concert tours that would later see release as The Bootleg Series Vol. 13. Dylan's influence was also felt in other members of the folk revival; Arlo Guthrie, for example, converted in 1979 (in part over his concerns over whether he faced a Huntington's disease diagnosis like others in his family) and released his own Christian folk-rock album Outlasting the Blues; Outlasting the Blues received the biggest record label promotion of Guthrie's career.

Christian rock was often viewed as a marginal part of the nascent contemporary Christian music (CCM) and contemporary gospel industry in the 1970s and 1980s, though Christian folk rock artists like Bruce Cockburn and rock fusion artists like Phil Keaggy had some cross-over success. Petra and Resurrection Band, two of the bands who brought harder rock into the early CCM community, had their origins in the early to mid-1970s. Swedish Christian hard rock band Jerusalem gained exposure on MTV in 1982 when their video "It's Mad" from the album Warrior was scheduled for broadcast; Billboard described it as a breakthrough for "gospel rock" on the channel. Petra and Rez Band reached their height in popularity in the mid to late eighties alongside other Christian-identifying hard rock acts such as Stryper. The latter had videos played on MTV, such as "Calling on You" and "To Hell with the Devil", and even saw some airtime on mainstream radio stations with their hit song "Honestly". Billboard noted that the band's success had "surprised major labels", observing that "Christian metal sells. Christian rock has proved less successful in the UK and Europe, although such artists as Bryn Haworth have found commercial success by combining blues and mainstream rock music with Christian themes.

Michael Knott would be credited for being a pioneer of "alternative Christian rock." Knott's 1987 album Shaded Pain being noted for lyrics which challenged church morality. This resulted in the album being banned by churches and Christian bookstores. Nevertheless, Knott was still credited for changing the course of Christian rock, with his short-lived company Blonde Vinyl becoming a major source for Christian rock musicians during its existence.

=== 1990s–present ===
"Flood"
Jars of Clay 1995

The 1990s saw an explosion of Christian rock. Many of the popular 1990s Christian bands were initially identified as "Christian alternative rock", including Jars of Clay. By the late 1990s and early 2000s, the success of acts like Skillet, Thousand Foot Krutch, Red, Underoath, P.O.D., Switchfoot, and Relient K saw a shift toward mainstream exposure. Rock label Tooth & Nail Records would be credited for having "altered the course of the Christian rock industry by launching and legitimizing the careers of MxPx, The O.C. Supertones and Underoath."

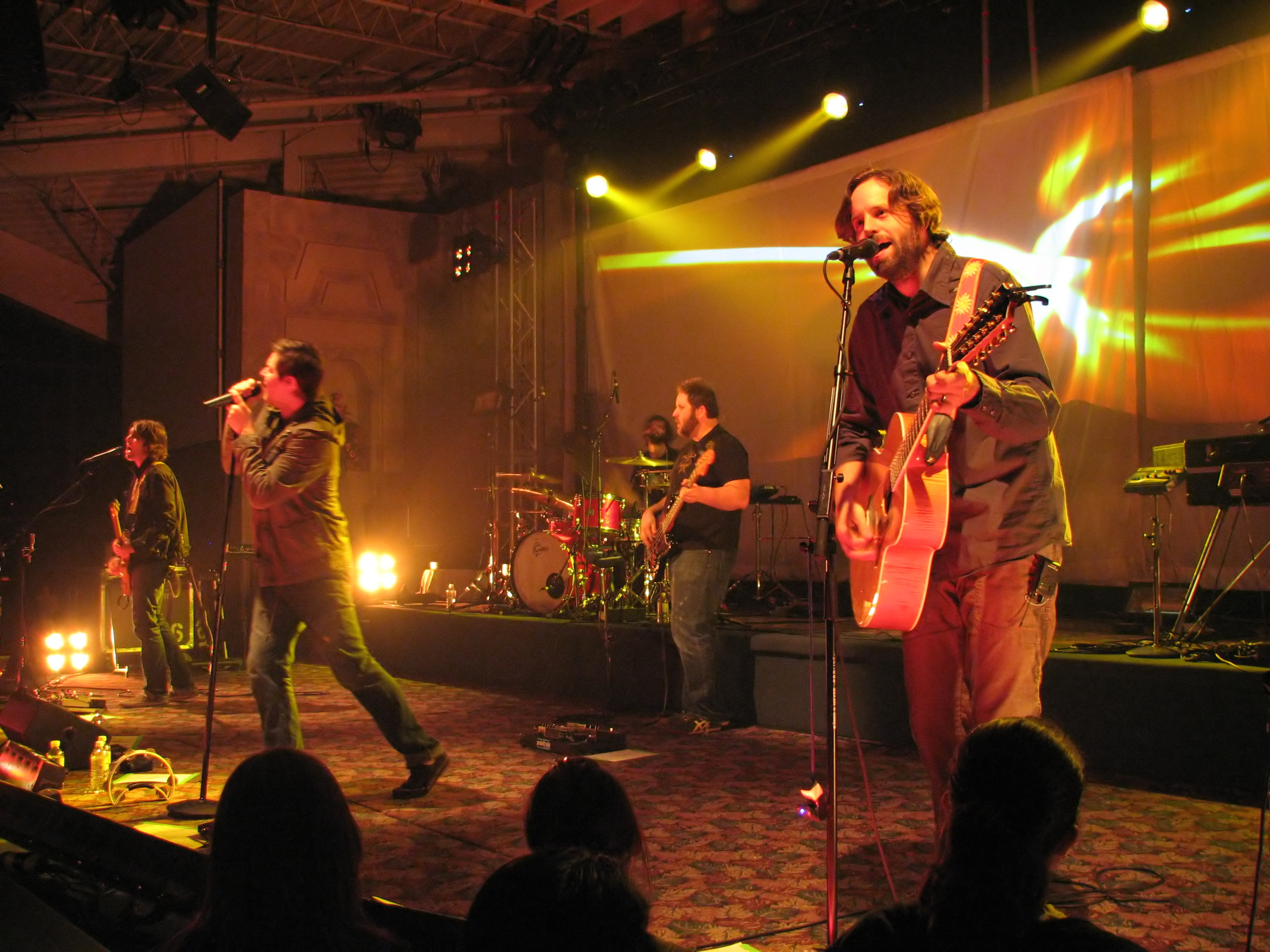
Jars of Clay in concert, 2007.

There are also some Roman Catholic bands such as Critical Mass. Some Eastern Orthodox Christian rock groups, mostly from Russia, started performing in the late 1980s and 1990s such as Alisa. The Orthodox Christian lyrics of these bands often overlap with historical and patriotic songs about Kievan Rus'.

The musical genre that was once rejected by mainstream Christian churches is now considered by certain churches as one of the most important evangelism tools of their congregations. According to Terri McLean, author of New Harmonies, old-guard churches (United Methodist is given as an example) of the late 1990s were experiencing a rapid decline in membership and were under threat of disbandment within the next decade, a trend that has been going on since the 1980s. McLean, using numerous quotes from theologians, Christian apologists and professors, points to traditional music styles as the reason for the falling popularity of more traditionalist churches.

The worship of God was originally removed from or hidden within the lyrics of early, secular rock n' roll. Santino described one method of changing Christian lyrics as a process that transformed "lyrics that sang of the mystical love of God into lyrics that celebrated the earthly love of woman". Howard & Streck offer examples of this, comparing Ray Charles' "This Little Girl of Mine" to "This Little Light of Mine" and "Talking About You" to "Talking About Jesus". They claim that because of actions such as this, despite the liberal editing of the original hymns, "gospel 'showed rock how to sing'". Howard & Streck go on to describe how the conflict between music and religion, spearheaded by southern fundamentalists, was originally racially based, but how in the sixties this moved on to a clash over the perceived lifestyle of rock musicians.

== Definitions ==
There are multiple definitions of what qualifies as a "Christian rock" band. Christian rock bands that explicitly state their beliefs and use religious imagery in their lyrics, like Servant, Third Day, and Petra, tend to be considered a part of the contemporary Christian music (CCM) industry.

Other bands perform music influenced by their faith or containing Christian imagery, but see their audience as the general public. For example, Bono of U2 combines many elements of spirituality and faith into his lyrics, but the band is not directly labeled as a "Christian rock" band.

Such bands are sometimes rejected by the CCM rock scene and may specifically reject the CCM label. Other bands may experiment with more abrasive musical styles. Beginning in the 1990s and 2000s there was much wider acceptance even by religious purists of Christian metal, Christian industrial and Christian punk. Many of these bands are on predominantly Christian record labels, such as Tooth and Nail Records and Facedown Records.

Rock artists, such as Switchfoot, do not claim to be "Christian bands", but include members who openly profess to be Christians or at times may feature Christian thought, imagery, scripture or other influences in their music.

I'm an artist who's a Christian, because I don't write music to be evangelical. Now, if that happens, it happens.

— Scott Stapp, lead vocalist for Creed

Some of these bands, like Creed, played up the spiritual content of their music and were widely considered a "Christian band" by the popular media. Some bands reject the label because they do not wish to exclusively attract Christian fans, or because they have been identified with another particular music genre, such as heavy metal or indie rock.

== Evangelism ==
The aims for making Christian music vary among different artists and bands. Often, the music makes evangelistic calls for Christian forms of praise and worship. Accompanying such music, street outreach, local festivities, church functions, and many alternative forms of internal or (soulful) expression may occur.

Some Christian artists as Third Day, Kutless, Thousand Foot Krutch and Disciple have sung songs that carry overtly Christian messages. Bands such as Underoath, Blessthefall and Haste the Day incorporate symbolism and Christian messages more indirectly. Bands such as Flyleaf do not call themselves Christian bands, though they state that their Christian faith affects their lyrics. Bands such as Switchfoot have said they try to write music for both Christians and non-Christians alike.

== Festivals ==
Festivals range from single day events to multiple-day festivals that provide camping and other activities.

One of the first in the US was the six-day Explo '72 held in Dallas, Texas in June 1972 that was attended by around 80,000 people with around 100,000 – 150,000 at the final concert and which featured acts such as Larry Norman, The Archers, Love Song, Randy Matthews, Children of the Day, Johnny Cash and Kris Kristofferson.

Significant festivals in the US are Creation Festival, Ichthus Festival, and Cornerstone Festival. There is also a festival in Orlando, Florida called Rock the Universe, a two-day festival at Universal Orlando Resort that overlaps with the Night of Joy event at Walt Disney World. Ichthus, currently held in Kentucky, is a three-day festival that involves over 65 bands.

There are also many in the UK, including Greenbelt Festival, Soul Survivor, BigChurchDayOut, 'Ultimate Events' at Alton Towers, Frenzy in Edinburgh and Creation Fest, Woolacombe, Devon, which is not related to Creationfest in the United States.

The Flevo Festival of The Netherlands, which offers seminars, theater, stand-up comedy, sports and movies as well as Christian music from a wide variety of genres, is considered to be one of the biggest Christian festivals in Europe. It was discontinued in 2013, due to financial issues. It has been unofficially restarted by a collection of Christian organizations who previously collaborated on Flevo Festival under the new name of Flavor Festival.

Skjærgårdsfestivalen is an annual music festival held in Norway, which headlines Christian rock bands.

Many events are held in Australia called, Easterfest (in Toowoomba) Encounterfest, Jam United, Black Stump and Big Exo Day. Bogotá, Colombia hosts the summer festival Gospel al Parque.

The most "underground" expression of Christian rock was the annual Cornerstone Festival sponsored by the Jesus People USA, a community which formed during the Jesus Movement of the 1970s. The festival ceased operations in 2012.

== See also ==
- List of Christian rock bands
