= Beyond the Veil (comics) =

Beyond the Veil is the title of the supernatural themed story created by writer and illustrator Rick Law. Originating in 1995 as a black and white comic series published in This Prophecy.

== Story ==
A contemporary fantasy, Beyond the Veil follows a male character (whose appearance is speculated to be based on the artist) who, after finding a pair of rose colored glasses, proceeds to "see things", experiencing visions and other manifestations that may be related to the end of the world. The visions progress, and the character struggles with his new foreknowledge and (as he starts to experience the phenomena outside of wearing the glasses) the question of whether this "sight" is a product of the glasses, or if they are merely a catalyst for his new "vision."

== Philosophy ==
The series heavily explores spiritual themes, attributable to the author's professed Christian faith. The title is expressive of the concept that there is a spiritual realm or dimension that exists parallel to this one.
