= Shaded Pain =

Studio album by Lifesavers Underground
- Released: 1987
- Recorded: 1987
- Genres: Gothic rock, post-punk
- Length: 37:49
- Label: Frontline Records
- Producer: Chris Brigandi

Lifesavers Underground chronology
A Kiss of Life (1986)	Shaded Pain (1987)	Wakin' Up the Dead (1989)

Professional ratings
Review scores
Source	Rating
Allmusic	4.5/5 stars

Shaded Pain is the fourth studio album by the American rock band Lifesavers Underground (LSU), released in 1987 on Frontline Records. A much different effort from their other releases before or since, Shaded Pain took a darker gothic rock direction from their previous pop punk sound, and features bleak, death-obsessed lyrics. Although misunderstood by many critics at the time, the album has attained a status of a cult classic. Later, the critics consider the album to be the band's finest effort and one of the best albums of the year it was released.

== Recording ==
Produced by Chris Brigandi and engineered by Ojo Taylor, featuring dark post-punk guitars with raw, echoed chords, rich soundscapes, and introspective, death-obsessed lyrics, the album created a controversy when it was released: listeners expecting a more happy-sounding punk rock album were horrified by the dark output, resulting with enormous amounts of the album being returned to the record company. Shaded Pain instead recalls the same sort of hollow, threatening darkness. Michael Knott's vocals combine styles from possessed howling ato shrieking through driving songs such as “Die Baby Die” and moaning like a "prophet of doom" in the chilling “Bye Bye Colour.” There is not much absolution on Shaded Pain, just endless emptiness. Even the up-tempo “Our Time Has Come” is built around the grim chorus: “Our time has come to kiss the cleaver.” Despite this, the record still sounds like a burst of creative energy, Brian Doidge's guitar screaming like a rabid swine and Knott's haunting voice is the embodiment of regret and self-loathing.

== Track listing ==
All songs written by Michael Knott, except where stated otherwise

1. "Jordan River" (3:55)
2. "Bye Bye Colour" (4:02)
3. "Die Baby Die" (2:25)
4. "Lonely Boy" (Knott, Doidge) (3:49)
5. "Our Time has Come" (3:37)
6. "Tether to Tassel" (3:36)
7. "I'm Torn" (3:52)
8. "Plague of Flies" (Knott, Doidge, Lee) (1:27)
9. "More to Life" (Knott, Doidge) (3:39)
10. "Shaded Pain" (4:10)

== Personnel ==
- Michael Knott - Vocals and 3 keyboard parts; cover art and all paintings
- Kevin Lee - Drums and cymbals
- Brian Doidge - Less Paul gold top, Ibanez 12 string acoustic, Yamaha 6 string acoustic, and a black bass
- Bridgett Knott - Vocals on "Jordan River" & "Lonely Boy"

== Impact ==
The album's lyrics which challenged church morality and abusive church leaders resulted in the album being banned from Christian bookstores, which at the time was one of the few places where Christian records could be purchased, and LSU leader Michael Knott being banned from performing in churches. Nevertheless, Knott would be later credited for pioneering an "alternative Christian rock scene."
