= Everything Was Beautiful and Nothing Hurt (Breakfast with Amy album) =

Studio album by Breakfast with Amy
- Released: 1990
- Genre: Christian alternative rock
- Length: 41:00
- Label: Narrowpath Records
- Producer: Breakfast with Amy

Breakfast with Amy chronology
Everything Was Beautiful and Nothing Hurt (1990)	Dad (1991)

Everything Was Beautiful and Nothing Hurt is the debut studio album by the Christian alternative rock band Breakfast with Amy, released in 1990. Produced by the band at Casbah Studios in Fullerton, California, Everything Was Beautiful and Nothing Hurt was the group's first release on Narrowpath Records. The album showcases songwriting and production values unorthodox for Christian musical groups in the late 1980s, demonstrating neo-psychedelic and punk rock influences cited by members, including Echo & the Bunnymen and early U2.

Despite its status as a debut release on an independent record label, the album sold in excess of 8,000 copies in the first two months following its release, during which the band toured briefly to promote their debut. In 1995, due to the sustained cult status of the band among many collectors, Graydot Records re-mastered and re-released the album with a collection of additional bonus tracks, including some of the band's early demos.

The title of the album is a reference to Billy Pilgrim's epitaph in Kurt Vonnegut's 1969 novel Slaughterhouse-Five.

== Track listing ==
1. "Icky" – 4:31
2. "Power" – 4:11
3. "Cavewoman" – 5:56
4. "This Train" – 4:21
5. "Mr. Ed" – 2:48
6. "Funeral" – 3:40
7. "Everything" – 4:15
8. "Ferris Wheel" – 3:34
9. "Abandoned Houses" – 3:35
10. "Social Studies" – 4:09

All songs written by BWA with the exception of "Abandoned Houses", "Funeral" Copyright 1986 by Christopher Colbert, Kim Molien, David Koval. "This Train" (Traditional)

=== Bonus tracks (Graydot Records re-release of the CD with added tracks) ===
1. "Ferris Wheel" (demo) – 9:07
2. "Love Song" (demo) – 4:43
3. "Funeral" (demo) – 5:32

== Personnel ==
- Bob Smith — vocals, electric sitar, acoustic guitar
- Eddie Bass — bass guitar
- Christopher Colbert — guitar
- Caryn Colbert — guitar
- Paul Pelligrin — drums
- Tennessee Beans — bass guitar (tracks 6–10)
- Dan Bush — engineer
