= Lifesavers Underground =

American band

- Also known as: L.S. Underground, LSU
- Origin: California, U.S.
- Genres: Rock; post-punk; gothic rock; alternative
- Years active: 1986–1998, 2007 - 2010
- Labels: MCR; Frontline; Alarma; Blonde Vinyl
- Past members: Michael Knott; Brian Doidge; Joshua Lory; Jim Chaffin; Rick McDonough; Mark Krischak; Kevin Annis; Chris Wimber; Brian Goins

Lifesavers Underground (aka LSU, and L.S. Underground) was a musical project created by Michael Knott.

In 1987, Lifesavers Underground released their debut album, Shaded Pain. This was followed in 1989 with Wakin' Up the Dead.

This Is the Healing was released in 1991; the album utilised a drum machine, while Knott played most of the musical instruments. The Grape Prophet (1993) was the first rock opera by Knott.

Released in 1993, their fifth album was Cash in Chaos: World Tour. At this point, Knott announced that he was changing the name of LSU to "Cash in Chaos" (hence the mixed band name for this release).

Grace Shaker was released in 1994, which was followed in 1998 by Dogfish Jones, another rock opera.

== Discography ==
- Shaded Pain - Lifesavers Underground, 1987 (Frontline Records)
- Wakin' Up The Dead - Lifesavers Underground, 1989 (Blonde Vinyl)
- This Is The Healing - Lifesavers Underground, 1991 (Blonde Vinyl)
- The Grape Prophet - L.S. Underground, 1992 (Blonde Vinyl)
- Cash in Chaos: World Tour - LSU, 1993 (Siren Records)
- Grace Shaker - LSU, 1994 (Alarma Records)
- Bring It Down Now - LSU, 1995 (Gray Dot)
- Dogfish Jones - LSU, 1998 (Light)
- Definitive Collection - LSU (and solo Michael Knott), 1998 (KMG)
- Finding Angel - LSU, 2001
- PTSD - L.S. Underground, 2010

Several bootlegs have appeared, including 3-14-81 and The Nashville Demos from the early 80s. Much like Knott, Krischak has released several projects since the demise of Lifesavers, including Generation XXX (2000).
