= Jeff Elbel =

American songwriter

Jeff Elbel is an American musician, songwriter, and producer based near Chicago. He writes for publications including the Chicago Sun-Times and he owns a recording studio. He is in bands including "Jeff Elbel+Ping" and Tom Sharpe's band.

== Discography ==
- Jeff Elbel + Ping: Gallery (Marathon Records) (2012)
- Jeff Elbel + Ping: Peanut Gallery EP (Marathon Records) (2011)
- Jeff Elbel + Ping: The Eleventh Hour Storybook (Marathon Records) (2005)
- Jeff Elbel + Ping: The Eleventh Hour Songbook (Marathon Records) (2004)
- Jeff Elbel + Ping: Engine of Destruction (Bootleg Live Records) (2004)
- Jeff Elbel + Ping: Loyal to You (Marathon Records) (2003)
- Jeff Elbel + Ping: Suffer the Children, Compilation memorial with Theo Obrastoff 2003
- Jeff Elbel + Ping: "You Still Believe in Me"/Making God Smile (Silent Planet) (2002)
- Jeff Elbel + Ping: No Outlet (Marathon Records) (2001)
- Jeff Elbel + Ping: Live at the Crooked Bar (2000)
- Jeff Elbel + Ping: "We the Living"/We the Living, Vol. III (True Tunes) (2000)
- Jeff Elbel + Ping: "Hell Oh"/When Worlds Collide (Stunt Records) (2000)
- Jeff Elbel + Ping: "Miracle Rain"/RIM v.beta (Bigwig Enterprises) (1999)
- Jeff Elbel + Ping: "Hell Oh"/When Worlds Collide: A Tribute to Daniel Amos (1999)
- Jeff Elbel + Ping: "Miracle Rain" (instrumental)/Looper's Delight, Volume II (Bigwig Enterprises) (1999)
- Ping/Aunt Bettys: "Popsicle Stick"/Ford Supersonic (Marathon/Ear Pistol Records) (1998)

- Tom Sharpe: Lifting the World (Sharpe World Music) (2014)
- Mumble: "Happy Living" (Marathon Records) (2010)
- North: Drowning In Sky (North Records) (2008)
- King Never: Orphans, Misfits, & Fragments (Marathon Records) (2006)
- Andrewesley: Strength (Marathon Records) (2004)
- Andrewesley: All I Wanted to Say EP (Kastra Records) (2004)
- Aaron Sprinkle: The Boy Who Stopped the World (Silent Planet) (2003)
- Hopescope: Bring in the Sun (Marathon Records) (2003)
- D.A.S.: Saving Grace (Galaxy21) (2003)
- Phil Madeira: "It'll Do For Now"/Live from the Acoustic Stage (Silent Planet) (2002)
- D.A.S.: Jesus Wants You to Buy this Record (independent) (2002)
- D.A.S.: "Christmas"/A Live Tribute Recording for Gene Eugene (Floodgate Records) (2000)
- EDL: Moment of Clarity (KMG Records) (1999)
- LSU: Dogfish Jones (Platinum Entertainment) (1998)
- Blackball: "Message in a Bottle"/The Mother of all Tribute Albums (HM Records) (1998)
- Farewell to Juliet: "Chase the Kangaroo"/To Cover You (Addeybug Records) (unreleased)
- Farewell to Juliet: Grace and Dire Circumstances (Marathon Records) (1998)
- Sunny Day Roses: "Pop"/Courting Courtney (film soundtrack) (1998)
- Jeff Elbel: "Miracle Rain (instrumental)"/Looper's Delight, Vol. II (Marathon Records) (1998)
- Sunny Day Roses: "You Know What to Do"/RIM: v.beta (Bigwig Entertainment) (1997)
- Jeff Elbel: "Miracle Rain"/RIM: v.beta (Bigwig Entertainment) (1997)
- Blackball: Hope (Metro One Records) (1997)
- Sunny Day Roses: Bloomshine! (Marathon Records) (1996)
- Farewell to Juliet: "Sorrow and Pride"/Tastes Like Chicken (Mootown Records) (1994)
- Farewell to Juliet: Echoes of Laughter (Marathon Records) (1993)
