= Michael Knott =

American singer-songwriter (1962–2024)

- Born: Michael Gerard Knott; December 22, 1962; Aurora, Illinois, U.S.
- Died: March 12, 2024 (aged 61)
- Genre: Christian rock
- Years active: 1987–2010
- Labels: Elektra Records, Rondor Music
- Formerly of: Aunt Bettys

Michael Gerard Knott (December 22, 1962 – March 12, 2024) was an American singer-songwriter and frontman for various bands, many of whom performed in the Christian rock genre. He released about 35 albums, including solo albums and albums with bands including LSU and Cush. He has been credited for pioneering the "alternative Christian rock scene".

== Early life and entrance into music ==
Michael Knott was born in Aurora, Illinois southeast of Rockford. His music has sometimes been controversial in Christian circles, particularly due to the use of profanity in the song "Rocket and a Bomb" (from the self-titled release of his former band Aunt Bettys) and original artwork on the album showing Jesus as a bartender. Knott's songwriting appealed to many people, particularly Christians who were able to admit their flaws and who appreciated the honesty with which he tackled his own shortcomings. Examples include "Double," "Shaded Pain," and the aforementioned "Rocket and a Bomb." He explained some of his views in an interview with HM Magazine saying, "... I'm a human being and I believe in Christ, period. It doesn't make my life rosy, it doesn't make my life terrible, it doesn't do anything with that. I know Christ." Knott, who emerged from Southern California's Christian punk scene, also fancied himself as a "punk Elvis."

== Music career ==
Knott's 1987 album Shaded Pain notably contained lyrics which challenged church morality and church leaders who were abusive. The album was banned from Christian bookstores, one of the few places where Christian albums were able to be purchased at the time. He was banned from performing in various churches.

Career highlights include LSU's Cornerstone appearance in 1993 when the band dressed in costumes, Aunt Bettys record-label bidding war, their eventual signing with Elektra Records in 1995, and a Jed the Fish "Catch of the Day" spin on KROQ for the Strung Gurus' "Sun-Eyed Girl". Members of Cush and Aunt Bettys joined Knott on stage for a Dennis Danell benefit concert at Verizon Wireless Arena in Manchester, New Hampshire with a line-up which included Pennywise, The Offspring, X, and Social Distortion. Aunt Bettys' "Feel" and several Mike Knott songs from Strip Cycle are prominently featured in the 1998 indie film Boogie Boy (Imperial), exec-produced by Roger Avary, a co-writer of Academy Award-winning Pulp Fiction. The director asked the Aunt Bettys to be Joan Jett's band in the movie, and the band originally agreed, but it didn't happen when new bassist Shawn Tubbs had to pull out over scheduling conflicts.

Knott was a painter, frequently signing his works under the name 'Gerard'. His artwork has been used for cover art on many of his own releases as well as releases by The Choir, Charity Empressa, and others. When he began touring again in 2000, he began creating painting series that he sold at shows and eventually online. Knott was the founder of the now defunct independent record label, Blonde Vinyl Records and he co-founded Tooth and Nail Records with Brandon Ebel.

Blonde Vinyl notably released 10 albums in 1991. They were successful for a short period, with Blonde Vinyl achieving popularity among Christian teens and 20-somethings. Blonde Vinyl, using the caption "New Alternative," may have introduced the official use of "alternative" to describe a style of music. However, the company went bust a few years into its existence, with its distributor Spectra Distribution filing for bankruptcy after owing a lot of money to Knott. However, Tooth and Nail has been described as having "altered the course of the Christian rock industry by launching and legitimizing the careers of MxPx, The O.C. Supertones and Underoath." Knott, who knew Ebel from his time at Frontline Records, was primarily involved to help get the label started and ultimately bowed out of the collaboration. He released one album with the company, his 1995 album Strip Cycle, with "Tattoo," directed by Darren Doane, being the label's first-ever music video. Ebel still leads the company. Knott began Siren Music and released a few significant records, before giving up on trying to run a record label in 1995.

In 1995, the Aunt Bettys were signed by Lara Noel Hill (Better Than Ezra) and Seymour Stein (Madonna, Talking Heads, the Ramones) at Elektra and co-managed by Cahn-Man Management (Elliot Cahn and Jeff Saltzman) who managed Green Day and other bands. The Aunt Bettys were given total creative control and shortly after they were signed, Ron Moss signed Knott to a publishing deal at Rondor Music (from Herb Alpert and Jerry Moss of A&M Records fame). Changes at Elektra and the management company (Green Day left their management), however, resulted in minimal promotion for the album. Nevertheless, both singles, "Jesus" and "Addict," received heavy rotation in San Diego at Rock 105.3.

The Aunt Betty's contract guaranteed two albums, but sensing more problems to come, Knott convinced Elektra to buy them out of the contract. Aunt Bettys then released their second album Ford Supersonic (originally through the independent Marathon Records label). Longtime collaborator Brian Doidge was eventually replaced by Sean Humeston (Value Pac) and Shawn Tubbs (Violet Burning) on bass. The band quit by the decade's end, and Knott started Strung Gurus with Social Distortion founding-guitarist Dennis Danell. When Danell died in early 2000, Knott began self-releasing several albums (many of which featured previously unreleased tracks) to coincide with a number of solo acoustic tours. In Sept. 2010, Aunt Betty's Ford (using their original name) reformed for a show at the Detroit Bar in Costa Mesa, California their first show together in 13 years.

Knott's 2010 album, PTSD by L.S. Underground is a concept album dealing with a soldier's post-traumatic stress disorder, a common risk for veterans of war. The band includes Crucified drummer Jim Chaffin. PTSD was given a generally positive review by D.W. Dunphy by Popdose. Dunphy's said, "L.S. Underground still survives, and while the music isn't for everyone, it is a welcome reminder to his fans that Michael Knott and company are back doing what they do best."

On September 7, 2014, Knottheads.com, the Michael Knott tribute site and his former label Blonde Vinyl, announced that a Kickstartercampaign to mark the 20th anniversary of Rocket and a Bomb was live. A concert was planned for November 7, 2014 in Concord, California in which the Rocket and a Bomb record was performed in its entirety. The full-band performance by Knott was billed, featuring special guests Michael Roe and Derri Daugherty, along with a special appearance by Dead Artist Syndrome. The Kickstarter project, which had a goal of $9,000, was fully funded prior to the fundraiser's deadline. On December 29, 2014, Knott had a heart attack and he recovered from surgery for the first part of 2015. A recording of the 2014 "Rocket and a Bomb" live performance as well as a new studio EP, Songs From The Feather River Highway, was digitally distributed to Kickstarter backers by May 2016. A release of the EP via Bandcamp followed.

NPR said Knott pioneered a form of Christian rock which "challenged the faithful to examine their faults and hypocrisies."

== Death ==
Knott died on March 12, 2024, at age 61 in Carlsbad, California.

== Bands ==
Knott participated in and/or formed many bands including:

- The Hightops – Early pop-punk band when Knott was a teenager (songs appear as bonus tracks on Huntington Beach album)
- The Lifesavors or Lifesavers – Early '80s pop punk
- Lifesavers Underground, aka L.S. Underground, aka LSU – Darker, goth-y alt-rock
- Bomb Bay Babies – General market guitar-driven pop punk band, signed to publishing deal with Windswept Pacific
- Idle Lovell – Dark alt-rock in a slightly different vein than LSU
- Michael Moret – A Dead or Alive-style new wave dance album that Knott wished he'd never made
- Aunt Bettys – Originally Aunt Bettys Ford, a story-telling general market rock band Knott started in 1993
- Cush – Post-modern rock band with former members of The Prayer Chain
- Strung Gurus – Acoustic rock band with Social Distortion guitarist Dennis Danell (RIP February 29, 2000)
- Struck Last May – 2007 project with Rick McDonough that dabbles into "... To Kill a Mocking Bird meets Sesame Street"

== Discography (solo) ==
- Screaming Brittle Siren – 1992 (Blonde Vinyl)
- Rocket and a Bomb – 1994 (Brainstorm Artists, Intl)
- Fluid – 1995 (Alarma Records)
- Strip Cycle – 1995 (Tooth & Nail)
- Definitive Collection – 1999 (KMG Records)
- Bomb Bay Babies – 2000 (Marathon)
- Live in Nash-Vegas – 2000 (Marathon)
- Things I've Done, Things to Come – 2000 (Marathon)
- Live at Cornerstone 2000 – 2000 (M8)
- Mother Nation (with Noah Reimer) – 2001 (Independent)
- Life of David – 2001 (Metro One, Review: HM Magazine)
- Hearts of Care – 2002 (Northern Records)
- Hearts of Care Demos – 2003 (Independent)
- Spring 2003 Tour CD #1 a.k.a. Jesus Help Me – 2003 (Independent)
- Spring 2003 Tour CD #2 a.k.a. Gerard – 2003 (Independent)
- Comatose Soul – 2004 (Independent)
- The All Indie E.P. – 2006 (Independent) – Only 500 signed and numbered copies.
- Songs From The Feather River Highway EP – 2016 (Independent) – Financing and initial distribution via Kickstarter.

=== Video ===
- Daniel Amos – Instruction Through Film DVD, cameo
