= Blonde Vinyl =

American independent record label

- Founded: 1990
- Founder: Michael Knott
- Defunct: 1993
- Distributor(s): Spectra, Diamante Music Group
- Genre: Christian rock
- Country of origin: U.S.

Blonde Vinyl was an independent record label founded in 1990 by Michael Knott. The Encyclopedia of Contemporary Christian Music describes the label as "one of Christian music's first true indie labels."

== Background ==
Blonde Vinyl signed bands with styles that were viable in the underground of the general market but rarely found their way into the Christian market—old school punk, garage rock, grunge, gothic, EBM/industrial, synthpop/house, spoken word, acoustic pop.

A gambit in 1991 which saw Blonde Vinyl release 10 albums proved successful for a short period of time, with the company having a major fanbase among Christian teens and 20-somethings. It would release albums for a two year period and carried the caption "New Alternative," which may have also introduced the official use of the word "alternative" to describe a style of music.

Blonde Vinyl folded in 1993 when its distributor Spectra Distribution, Inc. went bankrupt after owing Knott a great deal of money. After bankruptcy, Knott attempted to resurrect Blonde Vinyl under the name Siren Records. Siren managed two releases before going bankrupt: World Tour by LSU Cash in Chaos and Beautiful Dazzling Music No. 1 by Rainbow Rider (Dance House Children). After the failure of Siren, Knott started the band Aunt Bettys.

== Notable artists ==
- Breakfast with Amy
- Dance House Children
- Dead Artist Syndrome
- Deitiphobia
- LSU
- Lifesavers
- Lust Control
- Michael Knott
- Scaterd Few
- Sincerely Paul (2 of the Original Band members of S.P. are in the band SLIDE)
- Steve Scott
- Tribe of Dan

== Compilations ==
- Blonde Vinyl Teaser I (BVCD007 - 1991)
- Blonde Vinyl Teaser II / Food for Thought (BVCD0072 - 1991)
- SLAVA Compilation - Voice of the People (BVCD3442 - 1992)
- Radioactive Hits: The Definitive Blonde Vinyl Collection (84418-885-1 - 1993)

== See also ==
- List of record labels
