= Slow Meadow =

American solo music project

- Origin: Houston, Texas, US
- Genres: Ambient
- Years active: 2015–present
- Label: Hammock Music
- Members: Matt Kidd
- Website: www.slowmeadow.com

Slow Meadow is an American solo music project founded in Houston, Texas by Matt Kidd. Slow Meadow creates atmospheric ambient chamber music.

== History ==
Matt Kidd began creating post-rock and ambient soundscapes in 2012, ultimately releasing 2 albums under the name Aural Method. After taking a break from releasing music of his own for two years, Kidd befriended Marc Byrd of Hammock, and, with his encouragement, began creating more ambient music under his new moniker, Slow Meadow. Slow Meadow was signed to Hammock's own label, Hammock Music, who in turn released Slow Meadow's self-titled debut album in August 2015.

Slow Meadow performed live at The Gatherings Concert Series, presented by Star's End, in April 2016. Slow Meadow also performed a live concert for the Echoes syndicated radio program in August 2016.

== Discography ==
=== Albums ===
- Slow Meadow (2015)
- Costero (2017)
- Happy Occident (2019)
- By the Ash Tree (2020)
- Upstream Dream (2021)

=== Singles ===
- "Evoke", a musical score for the dance film "Evoke" (February 14, 2016)
- "Hananel's Recovery", an excerpt from the short documentary "Vitals" by director Jake Oleson (February 25, 2016)
- "Blue Aubade" feat. Hotel Neon (March 16, 2016)
- "Lachrymosia / Some Familiar..." (May 20, 2016)
- "A Magnificent Gray / Memoria" (August 5, 2016)
- "Absence / Blue Aubade (Slow Meadow version)" (October 14, 2016)
- "Palemote / Ghosts in the Brazos" (November 18, 2016)
- "Armoire Nocturne" (March 29, 2017)
- "The Tragedy of the Commons / Semolina" (August 11, 2017)
- "We're Losing the Moon / Cauda Luna" (March 16, 2018)
- "Those Who Rush Across the Sea / You Felt Like Home" (May 11, 2018)
- "Clouds, Not Clocks / Rara Pluma" (June 22, 2018)
- "Screensaver Prelude / Oh, the Myths We Need" (November 9, 2018)

=== As Aural Method ===
- When I Drifted I Heard a Faint Melody (2012)
- Slumber, Savage Beasts (2013)

== See also ==
- List of ambient artists
