= Raising Your Voice Trying to Stop an Echo =

Raising Your Voice...Trying to Stop an Echo

Studio album by Hammock
- Released: November 21, 2006
- Genre: Ambient, post-rock
- Length: 1:15:22
- Label: Darla, Hammock Music
- Producer: Marc Byrd and Andrew Thompson

Hammock chronology
The Sleep-Over Series (Volume 1) (2005)	Raising Your Voice...Trying to Stop an Echo (2006)	Maybe They Will Sing for Us Tomorrow (2008)

Raising Your Voice...Trying to Stop an Echo is the second studio album by American ambient/post-rock band Hammock. It was released on November 21, 2006, on Darla Records. It was reissued in 2011 by the band's own label, Hammock Music.

== Reception ==
Professional ratings
Review scores
Source	Rating
AllMusic	4/5 stars
Pitchfork	7.6/10 stars
PopMatters	8/10 stars

Raising Your Voice...Trying to Stop an Echo was met with positive critical reception. In his review for AllMusic, James Mason stated that, with this album, Hammock "leave behind the dream pop scene from whence they came, and become a band creating truly unique music -- transcendent shoegaze," further stating that this album left Hammock "at the top of their game." Joe Tangari, writing for Pitchfork, suggested that Raising Your Voice... was "an unassuming record that speaks to all those things in our lives that aren't tangible," and that the music was "meant to be a contrail in a solid blue sky, a smear of sound that goes oddly well with any number of emotional states."

Jason MacNeil, writing for PopMatters, stated that it's the album's "longing, melodic, meloncholic, and thoughtful texture that seems to tug at one's heartstrings from start to finish." MacNeil concluded his review by stating that "Nothing about this album is less than Grade A+ material, whether it’s the perfect "Disappear Like The Morning..." or the lovely "Passing Away". It's an album that forces one to reflect on both the highs and lows in one's life."

American webzine Somewhere Cold listed Raising Your Voice Trying to Stop an Echo No. 2 on their 2006 Somewhere Cold Awards Hall of Fame.

== Track listing ==
All tracks are written by Marc Byrd and Andrew Thompson.

No.	Title	Length
1.	"I Can Almost See You"	4:13
2.	"Raising Your Voice...Trying to Stop an Echo"	5:02
3.	"Losing You to You"	6:22
4.	"When the Sky Pours Down Like a Fountain"	5:22
5.	"The House Where We Grew Up"	4:16
6.	"God Send Us a Signal"	4:33
7.	"Clouds Cover the Stars"	1:28
8.	"Floating Away in Every Direction"	6:41
9.	"Take a Drink from My Hands"	4:59
10.	"Startle the Heavens (Lament)"	4:19
11.	"More Dead Than Alive (Get Away from the Medicine)"	1:11
12.	"Disappear Like the Morning..."	4:46
13.	"...Like Starlight into Day"	3:54
14.	"Shipwrecked (Flat on Your Back)"	3:58
15.	"Chorus of Trees"	2:11
16.	"Passing Away"	5:07
17.	"Will You Ever Love Yourself?"	5:47
18.	"Sparkle and Fade"	1:13
Total length:		1:15:22
