= Kenotic (album) =

Studio album by Hammock
- Released: March 29, 2005
- Genre: Post-rock, ambient, shoegaze
- Length: 70:04
- Label: Hammock Music

Hammock chronology
Kenotic (2005)	Stranded Under Endless Sky EP (2005)

Professional ratings
Review scores
Source	Rating
AllMusic	4/5 stars

Kenotic is the debut studio album by American ambient/post-rock band Hammock. It was released in March 2005 by Hammock Music. Reception of the record was generally positive, and cemented their musical reputation before their EP Stranded Under Endless Sky was released later that year. In December 2005, American webzine Somewhere Cold ranked Kenotic No. 5 on their 2005 Somewhere Cold Awards Hall of Fame list. The song titles "Through a Glass Darkly", "Winter Light", and "The Silence" were taken from the names of Ingmar Bergman films. The track title "You May Emerge From This More Dead Than Alive" came from the dialog of Ingmar Bergman's Winter Light.

On September 5, 2015, Hammock announced through their Facebook page that a deluxe remastered version of the album would be released to mark its 10-year anniversary.

== Track listing ==
=== CD edition ===
No.	Title	Length
1.	"Before the Celebration"	2:03
2.	"The Air Between Us"	3:43
3.	"Through a Glass Darkly"	5:19
4.	"Blankets of Night"	7:59
5.	"Winter Light"	4:12
6.	"Miles to Go Before Sleep"	5:16
7.	"Wish"	5:20
8.	"Overcast / Sorrow"	3:58
9.	"Glacial"	1:46
10.	"Kenotic"	4:15
11.	"Stars in the Rearview Mirror"	7:03
12.	"You May Emerge from This More Dead Than Alive"	1:13
13.	"What Heaven Allows"	4:23
14.	"The Silence"	5:20
15.	"Dawn Begins to Creep"	4:11
16.	"Rising Tide"	4:03

10th Anniversary Deluxe Edition Bonus Tracks
No.	Title	Length
17.	"Always Wishing You Were Somewhere Else - 2004 Kenotic Sessions (Alternate Mix)"	3:03
18.	"Turning to Stone - 2004 Kenotic Sessions"	3:44
19.	"Last Horizon - 2004 Kenotic Sessions"	3:35
20.	"Departure - 2004 Kenotic Sessions"	2:40
21.	"Frailty - 2004 Kenotic Sessions"	2:48
22.	"Storm Sets In - 2004 Kenotic Sessions"	3:18
23.	"Underneath the Skin - 2004 Kenotic Sessions"	6:09

== Personnel ==
- Marc Byrd – guitar
- Andrew Thompson – guitar
