= Tears Run Rings =

"Tears Run Rings" may refer to

- "Tears Run Rings" (song), a song from the 1988 Marc Almond album The Stars We Are
- Tears Run Rings (band), a 21st-century American shoegaze band
