= Artificial Paradise =

Artificial Paradise or Artificial Paradises may refer to:

- Artificial Paradise (The Guess Who album), 1973
- Artificial Paradise (OneRepublic album), 2024
- Artificial Paradise, a 2002 album by Sylvan
- Artificial Paradises, a 2009 EP by Henry Saiz
- "Artificial Paradise", a 1992 song by J. J. Cale from Number 10
- "Artificial Paradise", a 2018 song by Vlad Holiday
- "Artificial Paradises", a 2012 song by Hammock from Departure Songs
- Artificial Paradise (film), a 1990 Yugoslavian film
- Artificial Paradises (film), a 2012 Brazilian film
- Les Paradis artificiels (Artificial Paradises in English), an 1860 book by Charles Baudelaire
