= Longest Year =

EP by Hammock
- Released: December 14, 2010
- Genre: Ambient, post-rock
- Length: 32:50
- Label: Hammock Music
- Producer: Marc Byrd and Andrew Thompson

Hammock chronology
Chasing After Shadows... Living With the Ghosts (Outtakes) EP (2010)	Longest Year (2010)	Asleep in the Downlights EP (2011)

Longest Year is the fourth EP by American ambient band Hammock. It was released on December 14, 2010 by the band's own label, Hammock Music.

== Reception ==
Professional ratings
Review scores
Source	Rating
AllMusic	4/5 stars
Consequence of Sound	4/5 stars

Longest Year met with positive critical reception. Heather Phares of Allmusic noted that "Longest Year marks a distinct departure from Chasing After Shadows... Living with the Ghosts more structured, percussive tracks; these reveries float and glide all the more majestically for their almost complete lack of beats... The Longest Year's beauty is undeniable." Ryan Burleson, writing for Consequence of Sound, noted that the album "transmits more hope and transcendence than any amount of darkness gleaned from the title."

== Track listing ==
All tracks are written by Marc Byrd and Andrew Thompson.

No.	Title	Length
1.	"Longest Year"	8:24
2.	"Dark Beyond the Blue"	5:17
3.	"Cruel Sparks"	5:13
4.	"Lonely, Some Quietly Wander in the Hall of Stars"	7:14
5.	"One Another"	6:42
Total length:		32:50
