= Brørby =

Brørby is a Norwegian surname. Notable people with the surname include:

- Anders Brørby (born 1984), Norwegian composer and sound artist
- Berit Brørby (born 1950), Norwegian politician

== See also ==
- Wade Brorby (born 1934), American jurist
