= Maybe They Will Sing for Us Tomorrow =

Studio album by Hammock
- Released: May 6, 2008
- Genre: Ambient, post-rock
- Length: 1:01:06
- Label: Darla, Hammock Music
- Producer: Marc Byrd and Andrew Thompson

Hammock chronology
Raising Your Voice...Trying to Stop an Echo (2006)	Maybe They Will Sing for Us Tomorrow (2008)	Chasing After Shadows... Living with the Ghosts (2010)

Professional ratings
Review scores
Source	Rating
AllMusic	4/5 stars
Drowned in Sound	7/10
Pitchfork	7.2/10
PopMatters	6/10 stars

Maybe They Will Sing for Us Tomorrow is the third studio album by American ambient/post-rock band Hammock. It was released on May 6, 2008 on Darla Records and was reissued in 2013 by the band's own label, Hammock Music.

In December 2008, American webzine Somewhere Cold ranked Maybe They Will Sing for Us Tomorrow No. 2 on their 2008 Somewhere Cold Awards Hall of Fame.

== Track listing ==
All tracks are written by Marc Byrd and Andrew Thompson.

No.	Title	Length
1.	"Gold Star Mothers"	7:38
2.	"City in the Dust on My Window"	7:09
3.	"This Kind of Life Keeps Breaking Your Heart"	5:42
4.	"Mono No Aware"	6:39
5.	"Three Sisters"	4:22
6.	"Maybe They Will Sing for Us Tomorrow"	5:39
7.	"Elm"	5:24
8.	"Razorback Drug Town"	3:48
9.	"Eighty-Four Thousand Hymns"	5:40
10.	"We Will Say Goodbye to Everyone"	7:42
11.	"All of Your Children Are Addicts"	1:23
Total length:		1:01:06
