= Columbus (soundtrack) =

2017 film soundtrack album

Columbus (Original Motion Picture Soundtrack)

Film score by Hammock
- Released: November 3, 2017
- Genre: Film score
- Length: 45:24
- Label: Hammock Music

Columbus (Original Motion Picture Soundtrack) is the film score composed by Hammock to the 2017 film Columbus directed by Kogonada. The original score is composed by Hammock—a musical band consisted of guitarists Marc Byrd and Andrew Thompson—and the album featured 16 songs which were released through their Hammock Music label on November 3, 2017.

== Background ==
Kogonada sought out Hammock to create the soundtrack for Columbus (2017) after reading an interview with the band, claiming "they were talking about the relationship between absence and presence in their music—which was a mind-blowing moment—and [he] thought, 'They have to be the music for this film.'" After receiving few anecdotes from Kogonada, the band wrote and recorded the musical pieces on a tight schedule in time to be completed for the premiere in 2017 Sundance Film Festival.

== Release ==
Columbus (Original Motion Picture Soundtrack) was released through Hammock's own label on November 3, 2017, few months after the film's release.

== Reception ==
Jeff Bergstrom of BrooklynVegan wrote, "Hammock's moody soundtrack is perfectly matched to the film's narrative tone as well as the gorgeous photography." Stationary Travels wrote, "The music is Hammock at their most pensive and restrained, perfectly suited to the nuanced narrative and elegant if slightly aloof minimalism of the architectural forms around which it revolves." Michael Eades of We Own this Town summarized it as "a slow, spaced-out, moving body of work occasionally undercut by some tense, foreboding, presence", further adding that "Hammock has been refining this kind of sound for years and this is an exemplary application of their efforts".

Geoff Berkshire of Variety described it as a "sparingly but very effectively used ambient electro score". Mark Jenkins of NPR wrote "Hammock's burbling electro score is as stark as an I.M. Pei facade". Justin Souther of Mountain Xpress called the score "too quiet". Liam Higgins of SCAD Radio considered it one of the "under appreciated film scores" of 2017, adding that "Hammock's wonderful score manages the tricky balance of not overwhelming the hushed tone of the film, while also accentuating the emotions present in many of the key scenes."

== Track listing ==
All music is composed by Hammock.

Columbus (Original Motion Picture Soundtrack) track listing
No.	Title	Length
1.	"Pei"	3:53
2.	"Meier"	2:20
3.	"Venturi"	2:22
4.	"Eliel"	4:19
5.	"Eero"	2:23
6.	"SOM"	3:00
7.	"Berke"	1:37
8.	"Polshek"	1:47
9.	"Warnecke"	2:39
10.	"Birkerts"	1:14
11.	"Weese"	4:48
12.	"Goldsmith"	2:22
13.	"Roche"	1:38
14.	"Valkenburgh"	4:13
15.	"Jimenez"	2:30
16.	"Saitowitz"	4:19
Total length:		45:24
