= Stranded Under Endless Sky =

EP by Hammock
- Released: July 26, 2005
- Genre: Ambient, post-rock, shoegaze
- Length: 25:29
- Label: Hammock Music, Republic of Texas Recordings, Somewherecold Records
- Producer: Marc Byrd and Andrew Thompson

Hammock chronology
Kenotic (2005)	Stranded Under Endless Sky (2005)	The Sleep-Over Series (Volume One) (2005)

Stranded Under Endless Sky is the first extended play by American ambient band Hammock. A follow-up to the band's first studio album, Kenotic, Stranded Under Endless Sky was released on compact disc through the band's own label, Hammock Music, on July 26, 2005. A 140-gram 12" vinyl version was released earlier that month, on July 16, 2005, through Republic of Texas Recordings and Somewherecold Records; it was limited to 100 copies on clear vinyl and 900 copies on black vinyl.

== Reception ==
Professional ratings
Review scores
Source	Rating
AllMusic	3.5/5 stars

Stranded Under Endless Sky was met with positive critical reception. James Mason of AllMusic noted that the album packs "enough emotion and provocative instrumental storytelling to fully engage and satisfy even the most jaded listener" and served as a great introduction and for fans, a perfect teaser for the next album.

== Track listing ==
All tracks are written by Marc Byrd and Andrew Thompson.

No.	Title	Length
1.	"Stranded Under Endless Sky"	5:00
2.	"Birds Flying in Sequence"	7:47
3.	"Always Wishing You Were Somewhere Else"	3:02
4.	"An Empty Field"	9:40
Total length:		25:29
