= Chasing After Shadows... Living with the Ghosts =

Studio album by Hammock
- Released: May 18, 2010
- Genre: Ambient, post-rock
- Length: 72:39
- Label: Hammock Music
- Producer: Marc Byrd and Andrew Thompson

Hammock chronology
Maybe They Will Sing for Us Tomorrow (2008)	Chasing After Shadows... Living with the Ghosts (2010)	Chasing After Shadows... Living with the Ghosts (Outtakes) (2010)

Chasing After Shadows... Living with the Ghosts is the fourth studio album by American ambient/post-rock band Hammock. It was released on May 18, 2010 by the band's own label, Hammock Music.

In addition to the standard edition, Chasing After Shadows... Living with the Ghosts was released in a limited edition format with a photobook and four-track EP titled North West East South. The album received generally positive reviews. Critics praised the songwriting and production, though some reviewers criticized the album's length.

== Background ==
After releasing the minimalistic Maybe They Will Sing for Us Tomorrow in 2008, Hammock wanted to create an album with "a very full atmosphere". "It wasn't like an intentional reaction to Maybe rather it felt like a natural progression of what we wanted to do at the time", the band commented. "As an artist, that's the voice you have to follow."

== Music ==
The band described Chasing After Shadows... Living with the Ghosts as "[their] most bombastic record so far", and as "more organic".

Byrd and Thompson were inspired by the landscape of the Deep South, where they both grew up, and from "an understanding of the impermanence of life. When we look at this aspect of the human experience straight in the face we have a greater appreciation of life but at the same time we also experience a deep sense of melancholy." They cited atmospheric artists such as Brian Eno, William Basinski, Stars of the Lid, Cocteau Twins, the Church and the Cure as influences, in addition to more cinematic acts, including Sigur Rós, Max Richter, Johann Johannsson and Arvo Pärt.

=== Composition ===
Chasing After Shadows... Living with the Ghosts was written by the band by introducing "almost every idea we have" and then "[criticizing themselves] to death".

== Release and promotion ==
Chasing After Shadows... Living with the Ghosts was released on May 18, 2010 in the US and June 14, 2010 in the UK. The band made outtakes from the album available online. A limited edition of the album, featuring a photobook and four-track EP titled North West East South, was also released. The album's title described "only seeing the shadow of things and not their reality". The band stated that the use of ellipsis "both continues and separates a thought."

Hammock collaborator Thomas Petillo created the album's artwork while traveling through the Deep South with Byrd and Thompson. The figures floating in water were photographed at Hot Springs, Arkansas. however, Petillo intended the cover to represent rebirth.

== Reception ==
Professional ratings
Review scores
Source	Rating
AllMusic	4.5/5 stars
BBC	(favorable)
Drowned in Sound	6/10 stars
Pitchfork	(7.3/10)
PopMatters	6/10 stars

Chasing After Shadows... Living with the Ghosts was met with positive critical reception. BBC critic Mike Diver ranked it as "one of the most beautiful albums of this year." James Mason of AllMusic noted that "as objective a concept as perfection is, it is hard to think of what Hammock have achieved here as anything else." Ryan Reed of PopMatters described the album as "perfect sonic accompaniment for the half-dreams that plague a restless sleep."

Critics noted that the album featured "a slight move toward more conventional rock structures" and more acoustic textures than their previous releases, but that fans of Hammock's previous releases would still enjoy it. When comparing the album with Maybe They Will Sing for Us Tomorrow, Diver criticized the album for feeling "uncomfortably boxed in, its textures equally rich but unable to flow in the manner its makers previously permitted."

Joe Tangari of Pitchfork described the music as "intensely visual... you really get the sense of shapes shifting and forms moving." Mason praised the album's songwriting. "The temptation to slip into melodrama with music like Hammock's must be immense, but Byrd and Thompson know when to push over the top and when to pull back, take in the surrounding view, and pour that beauty into their songs," he said. "The exhilarating thing about this record is that they walk this line, between being at the top and going over." Ferguson felt the strings were underused on the album, noting that "when they do come to the fore, the arrangements are excellent." The album's production was praised by Mason. Reed said his favorite moments were those where "the surprising details creep in". In contrast, Diver described the production as "patchy".

The album's length was noted by reviewers. Mason praised the album for "[working] as an entire piece, not a mere collection of songs." Tangari said the album was "easy to luxuriate in for its full run time." Writing for Drowned in Sound, Robert Ferguson praised the opening three tracks, but felt that "from here is where Chasing After Shadows... starts to feel a bit samey." "Halfway through the album... the euphoria starts to wear off," Reed said, "and it becomes difficult not to beg for a fresh chord change or a new instrument."

== Track listing ==
All tracks are written by Marc Byrd and Andrew Thompson.

No.	Title	Length
1.	"The Backward Step"	4:58
2.	"Tristia"	5:46
3.	"Little Fly/Mouchette"	5:52
4.	"Breathturn"	6:00
5.	"In the Nothing of a Night"	8:48
6.	"Andalusia"	7:42
7.	"The Whole Catastrophe"	3:52
8.	"The World We Knew As Children"	5:39
9.	"Dust Is the Devil's Snow"	6:43
10.	"How Can I Make You Remember Me?"	4:55
11.	"You Lost the Starlight in Your Eyes"	9:14
12.	"Something Other Than Remaining"	3:10
Total length:		72:39

== Personnel ==
- Hammock (Marc Byrd and Andrew Thompson) – guitars, vocals, percussion, producers
- Steve Hindalong– drums, percussion
- Tim Powles – drums
- Love Sponge Strings and Horns – strings, horns
- Matt Slocum – cello
- Christine Glass Byrd – vocals
- Tim Powles – mixing, additional production
- Derri Daughterty – mixing
- William Bowden – mastering
- Thomas Petillo – photography
