= Amy Pleasant =

American painter (born 1972)

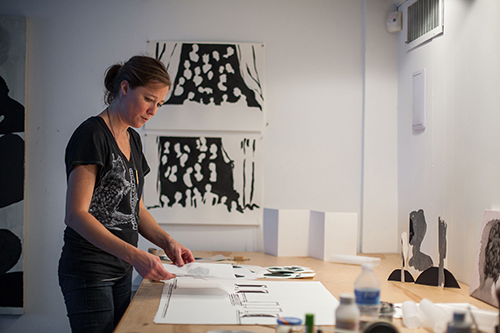
- Born: 1972; Birmingham, Alabama
- Education: The School of the Art Institute of Chicago, Tyler School of Art
- Known for: Painting, Drawing, Wall Drawing
- Awards: Guggenheim Fellowship (2018), Joan Mitchell Foundation Painters & Sculptors Grant (2015)
- Website: amypleasant.com

Amy Pleasant (born 1972) is an American painter living and working in Birmingham, AL. She is the co-founder of The Fuel and Lumber Company, a curatorial initiative.

== Biography ==
Pleasant received a BFA from The School of the Art Institute of Chicago and an MFA from the Tyler School of Art at Temple University. Pleasant is best known for her figurative, free associative paintings and drawings that explore simple, daily acts in slowly unfolding narratives. In an article from Art in America, Max Henry wrote that her work "chronicles everyday life…full of existential angst and loneliness, her paintings are able to evoke an empathetic response from the viewer." David Moos wrote of Pleasant's work that through "fragments of overlapping narratives" the viewer is allowed to "glimpse the formation of images" and is "made aware of how the painter makes decisions in paint, amending a passage and visibly editing the composite image." Martha Schwendener, art critic for The New York Times and critic of photography at the Yale School of Art, reviewed Pleasant's work in the contemporary art periodical Artforum, stating that Pleasant's paintings are "laid out in grids which collectively hint at angst-ridden narratives" which are stylistically reminiscent of "early Sue Williams paintings—the vitriolic feminist ones—or comics whose narrative core has disintegrated, leaving behind only the shame, fear, or desire that instigated them in the first place."

== Exhibitions ==
Pleasant has held solo exhibitions at the Hunter Museum of American Art (Chattanooga, TN), Laney Contemporary (Savannah, GA), Institute 193 (Lexington, KY), Geary Contemporary (New York, NY), Indianapolis Contemporary (Indianapolis, IN), the Birmingham Museum of Art, The Atlanta Contemporary Art Center (Atlanta, GA), the Jeff Bailey Gallery, Rhodes College, The Ruby Green Center for Contemporary Art (Nashville, TN), and the University of Alabama, Birmingham.

Pleasant has participated in group exhibitions at venues such as the Bemis Center for Contemporary Arts (Omaha, NE), KDR (Miami, FL), Hesse Flatow (New York, NY), Pamela Salisbury (Hudson, NY), Mindy Solomon Gallery (Miami, FL), Tif Sigfrids (Athens, GA), Adams and Ollman (Portland, OR), The Dodd Galleries at the Lamar Dodd School of Art (Athens, GA), Hemphill Fine Arts (Washington D.C.), University of Arkansas (Fayetteville, AR), the Knoxville Museum of Art (Knoxville, TN), the Weatherspoon Art Museum (Greensboro, NC), Columbus Museum of Art (Columbus, GA), the Wiregrass Museum of Art (Dothan, AL), the National Museum of Women in the Arts (Washington, DC), the Southeastern Center for Contemporary Art (Winston-Salem, NC), the Art Museum of the University of Memphis (Memphis, TN), the Mobile Museum of Art (Mobile, AL), the United States Embassy in Prague, Czech Republic, and the Huntsville Museum of Art (Huntsville, AL). Her work was also included in the 2019 Atlanta Biennial at Atlanta Contemporary, co-curated by Daniel Fuller and Phillip March Jones.

Pleasant's work is also included in the Drawing Center's Viewing Program (New York, NY).

Her work can be found in the collections of the Montgomery Museum of Fine Arts, the Abroms-Engel Institute for the Visual Arts, the Birmingham Museum of Art, the Knoxville Museum of Art, the Columbus Museum of Art, the Wiregrass Museum of Art, the Progressive Corporation, the U.S. Consulate General in Dubai, the Google Ventures Collection (San Francisco, CA), the Coca-Cola Fine Art Collection (Atlanta, GA), the Hunter Museum of American Art (Chattanooga TN), the Bernard A. Zuckerman Museum of Art (Kennesaw, GA), as well as in many private collections.

Pleasant was commissioned by the American ambient/post-rock band Hammock to create the album art for its 2013 release, Oblivion Hymns. A limited edition screen print, Repose, was featured at the 20th Annual ART PAPERS auction in 2019. In the past, she was represented by Jeff Bailey Gallery (New York, NY) and is currently represented by Whitespace Gallery (Atlanta, GA) and Laney Contemporary (Savannah, GA).

Her first monograph, The Messenger's Mouth Was Heavy, was co-published in 2019 by Institute 193 and Frank and includes essays by Daniel Fuller and Katie Geha.

In 2021, Emory's Public Art's Committee commissioned the installation of an Amy Pleasant work called "Resting Figure" for the Emory Atlanta campus art collection. The work is to honor Emory Healthcare and Emory University personnel's sacrifice, commitment, and dedication during the COVID-19 pandemic. This sculpture's creation was generously supported by Rebecca and Sidney Yarbrough 59C 63M 64MR 67MR 70MR P01.

From October 20, 2022 – January 8, 2023, a maquette called Torso II was on display at the Connections: The Power of Objects exhibition at the Robert W Woodruff Library. The maquette was created by artist Amy Pleasant to cast the twelve foot tall bronze outdoor sculpture that will be situated between the Quad and Cox Hall on Emory's campus starting April 2023.

== Awards ==
Pleasant has been the recipient of a number of awards in recognition of her art, including both the prestigious Guggenheim Fellowship in 2018 as well as the 2018 South Arts Southern Prize and State Fellowship for the State of Alabama.

In December 2015, Pleasant was announced as one of only 25 recipients of the 2015 Joan Mitchell Foundation Painters & Sculptors Grant, which acknowledges painters and sculptors creating work of exceptional quality through unrestricted career support.

Other awards include the Mary Hambidge Distinguished Artist Award (2015) and Individual Art Fellowships from both the Cultural Alliance of Birmingham (2008) and the Alabama State Council on the Arts (2003, 2019).

== Media ==
- The Modern Art Notes Podcast w/host Tyler Green.
- The Sound & Vision Podcast w/host Brian Alfred.
