= Departure Songs =

Studio album by Hammock
- Released: October 2, 2012
- Genre: Ambient, post-rock
- Length: 1:49:50
- Label: Hammock Music
- Producer: Marc Byrd and Andrew Thompson

Hammock chronology
| Asleep in the Downlights (2010) | Departure Songs (2012) | Oblivion Hymns (2013) |

Departure Songs is the fifth studio album (and first double album) by American ambient/post-rock band Hammock. It was released on October 2, 2012 by the band's own label, Hammock Music.

== Reception ==
Professional ratings
Review scores
| Source | Rating |
|---|---|
| AllMusic | 4/5 stars |
| ContactMusic.com | 9/10 stars |
| Echoes | #1 of 2012 |

Departure Songs was met with positive critical reception. John Diliberto, the host of Echoes, named Departure Songs the No. 1 album of the year for 2012 in his annual year-end "Top 10 Albums" list. Elizabeth Klisiewicz, writing for The Headphone Commute, stated that "Hammock go massive as they meditate on grand themes of death and loss, their music ever larger, more expansive." Jordan Dowling at Contactmusic.com described the album as "where it all comes together. Every disparate strand and sound conjured over the past eight years is no longer separated by song or by album, but layered on top of each other on a release that encompasses and near enough perfects the depth and breadth of the Nashville duo's back-catalogue." Matt Gilley at Fluid Radio posited that the album is "probably the closest thing to an ambient/post-rock opera anyone has ever written, and if anyone is ever going to write one, it'll probably be Hammock." Ned Raggett noted in his review for AllMusic that "if Hammock's fifth album is something of an extension and consolidation of their past work... it's also a flat-out triumphant one."

== Artwork ==
The additional artwork featured a theatre, with posters on the windows displaying the words "Chansons de Départ", which is French for "Departure Songs".

== Track listing ==
All tracks are written by Marc Byrd and Andrew Thompson.

| No. | Title | Length |
|---|---|---|
| 1. | "Cold Front" | 6:56 |
| 2. | "Ten Thousand Years Won't Save Your Life" | 6:27 |
| 3. | "Together Alone" | 7:07 |
| 4. | "Artificial Paradises" | 5:18 |
| 5. | "(Tonight) We Burn Like Stars That Never Die" | 6:26 |
| 6. | "Pathos" | 6:45 |
| 7. | "Awakened, He Heard Only Silence" | 3:01 |
| 8. | "Words You Said... I'll Never Forget You Now" | 6:32 |
| 9. | "Tape Recorder" | 6:05 |
| 10. | "Frailty (For the Dearly Departed)" | 6:52 |
| 11. | "Dark Circles" | 6:13 |
| 12. | "(Let's Kiss) While All the Stars Are Falling Down" | 6:51 |
| 13. | "All Is Dream and Everything Is Real" | 5:57 |
| 14. | "Mute Angels" | 4:55 |
| 15. | "Hiding but Nobody Missed You" | 5:05 |
| 16. | "We Could Die Chasing This Feeling" | 6:22 |
| 17. | "Glossolalia" | 2:07 |
| 18. | "(Leaving) The House Where We Grew Up" | 6:01 |
| 19. | "Tornado Warning" | 4:50 |
| Total length: | | 1:49:50 |
