= Tape Deck Mountain =

American shoegaze/indie rock band

Tape Deck Mountain is an American shoegaze/indie rock band founded in 2008 by San Diego native, Travis Trevisan. The band currently resides in Nashville, Tennessee. Pitchfork Media dubbed them 'dark surf' and Wild Honey Pie said they were 'brooding, shoegaze nirvana'. Their song "Gfhost Colony" was feature in Season 2 of Sons of Anarchy. International Film Channel feature a live set of band performing live from San Diego, CA International Film Channel feature a live set of band performing original songs and Danzig cover. The band contributed an exclusive song to Somewherecold Records' Various Artists compilation Resistance Compilation II: In Support of the ACLU, released on July 3, 2020.

== Albums ==
- Ghost (November 17, 2009 US / Lefse Records)
- Sway (October 15, 2013 US/EUR - Nineteen98 / Mouca)
