= Oblivion Hymns =

Studio album by Hammock
- Released: November 26, 2013
- Genre: Ambient, post-rock
- Length: 56:48
- Label: Hammock Music
- Producer: Marc Byrd, Andrew Thompson

Hammock chronology
Departure Songs (2012)	Oblivion Hymns (2013)	The Sleepover Series (Volume 2) (2014)

Oblivion Hymns is the sixth studio album by American ambient/post-rock band Hammock. It was released on November 26, 2013 by the band's own label, Hammock Music.

The album cover for Oblivion Hymns was created as a commissioned piece by artist Amy Pleasant.

== Reception ==
Professional ratings
Review scores
Source	Rating
Sputnikmusic	4.0/5 stars

Oblivion Hymns was met with positive critical reception and hit No. 17 on the Billboard Top Heatseekers Album Chart in 2013. Mike Diver at Clash magazine loved the album, stating that Oblivion Hymns is "…some of the most blissful music Clash has ever had the luxury of bathing in. [Hammock] has gone on to become one of the foremost purveyors of affecting ambient post-rock on the scene."

John Diliberto, the host of Echoes, listed Oblivion Hymns as No. 8 in the "25 Essential Echoes CDs for 2013" as an album that represented the best, most innovative aspects of the ambient music soundscape in the past year, stating that "Hammock goes deeper into their ambient chamber music with children’s choirs emerging out of swirling deeply processed guitars." Echoes also selected Oblivion Hymns as the CD of the Month for January 2014. Fred Pessaro, writing for Vice magazine's Noisey site, stated that the music of Oblivion Hymns is "expansive and dramatic ambient post-rock… the kind that would fit perfectly as a soundtrack to a film."

In his review for KEXP, Don Yates notes how Hammock "reworks their ambient post-rock sound on their latest album, moving in a more neo classical musical direction while adding a string quartet, horns, accordion, glockenspiel, a children’s choir and more to their layers of atmospheric shoegazer guitars for an often-transportive set of glacial instrumentals." KEXP also charted Oblivion Hymns at No. 7 in the KEXP Variety Music Chart for December 2013 and named the first track, "My Mind Was a Fog... My Heart Became a Bomb" as Song of the Day on January 8, 2014.

Raul Stanciu, writing for Sputnikmusic, felt that Oblivion Hymns is a "natural progression to [Hammock's] transcending discography. This neoclassical-meets-post-rock direction opens new doors…", while Elizabeth Klisiewicz, writing for The Big Takeover, described how songs on the record are "stuffed full of emotion, as [one] can imagine… standing on the edge of an infinite abyss, marvelling… Hammock’s music draws out such powerful emotions that one can be blinded with joy even while tears blur your vision. Perhaps it’s like witnessing a miracle, albeit a sonic one."

A feature for the October 2013 issue of Magnet stated that Oblivion Hymns "rewrites Hammock's script, bringing strings to the fore in a manner that would make composer Max Richter or Hammock's peers in A Winged Victory for the Sullen proud."

Vevo's Alt/Indie Spotlight highlighted Hammock's music video for "I Could Hear The Water at the Edge of All Things" via Vevo's Twitter feed, calling the video both "tragic" and "incredibly beautiful."

== Track listing ==
All tracks are written by Marc Byrd and Andrew Thompson.

Standard CD
No.	Title	Length
1.	"My Mind Was a Fog... My Heart Became a Bomb"	5:23
2.	"Then the Quiet Explosion"	6:43
3.	"Turning Into Tiny Particles... Floating Through Empty Space"	4:02
4.	"Like a Valley with No Echo"	8:10
5.	"Holding Your Absence"	5:42
6.	"Shored Against the Ruins... Drowning in Ten Directions"	3:43
7.	"I Could Hear the Water at the Edge of All Things"	5:40
8.	"In the Middle of This Nowhere"	5:33
9.	"Hope Becomes a Loss"	8:45
10.	"Tres Dominé"	3:07
Total length:		56:48

Bonus tracks (download)
No.	Title	Length
11.	"Sleep"	6:32
12.	"Cathedral"	6:18
13.	"Hiraeth"	6:53
Total length:		76:31
