= Christine Glass =

American singer-songwriter

- Also known as: Christine Glass Byrd, Christine Byrd
- Origin: Louisiana
- Occupations: singer, songwriter, background vocalist
- Years active: 1997-present
- Labels: Tattoo, Rustproof, Word, Hammock Music
- Member of: Lumenette
- Formerly of: Christine Glass, GlassByrd
- Spouse: Marc Byrd (m. 2001)

Christine Glass Byrd is an American singer-songwriter and background vocalist. Between 1997 and 2003, she released three Christian music albums— two as a solo artist and one in the duo GlassByrd with her husband Marc Byrd. Known for her "ethereal" voice, Glass has contributed background vocals to many projects including Common Children, The Choir, and Hammock. In 2022, she released the album All Around My Head under the stage name Lumenette.

== Career ==
Originally from Louisiana, Glass trained to be an opera singer at Louisiana Tech University. After finishing her degree, she moved to Nashville, Tennessee, and worked at Word Records as a receptionist and an art director. Her debut album, Human, was released in 1997 on Tattoo Records, and the song "I Believe (Jesus Is Coming)" reached #15 on Christian music charts in 1997. In a 2003 interview, she said she had mistakenly thought her "really alternative record" could be successful in the Christian market.

At the suggestion of her record label, she began songwriting with label mate, Marc Byrd, lead singer of Common Children. Their song, "Whisper", was recorded for Common Children's second album, with Glass providing backup vocals. They eventually started dating and married in 2001. Love & Poverty, released in 1999 on Rustproof Records, was co-produced by Marc Byrd and Steve Hindalong.

With Marc Byrd, she recorded a worship music album called Open Wide this Window, under the name GlassByrd in 2003. "Weight of the World" charted on the Billboard Christian music charts in 2003. They were later dropped from their record label, Word Records.

Glass has contributed vocals to numerous projects, and her voice has been called "ethereal", "angelic", “haunting”, and “ghost-like”. Beginning in 1997 with Common Children's second album and continuing with The Choir and Hammock, Glass has vocal credits on a number of Marc Byrd's projects. In 2011, she sang on a Hammock cover of Catherine Wheel's “Black Metallic”. In two reviews, Pitchfork has noted how Glass’s voice blends with the guitars, synths, and other instruments used in Hammock’s music: “extricating that lovely, wordless female voice that sometimes colors the texture from the guitars is nearly impossible. She's the silver lining on the cloud of vibrating strings.” Her other credits include vocals for City on a Hill, Cool Hand Luke, The Glorious Unseen, and Andy Hunter.

In 2022, Glass released the album All Around My Head under the stage name, Lumenette. The album, released on Hammock Music, departs from the overtly Christian themes of Glass’s earlier albums, instead focusing on themes of depression and love. One review states: "the reverb-coated vocals, delayed infused guitars and atmospheric swells, synths and strings blend together to create a perfect storm of tranquility".

== Personal life ==
Born Christine Glass, she changed her name to Christine Glass Byrd after she married Marc Byrd. In more recent years, she has been using the name Christine Byrd professionally.

== Discography ==
=== Albums ===
- Christine Glass—Human (1997), Tattoo Records
- Christine Glass—Love and Poverty (1999), Rustproof Records
- GlassByrd—Open Wide this Window (2003), Word Records
- Lumenette—All Around My Head (2022), Hammock Music

=== Music Videos ===
- Christine Glass—"Crazy All Around" (1997), Tattoo Records
