= In Solarium =

Studio album by Pia Fraus
- Released: 2002
- Genre: Rock, indie rock, shoegaze
- Label: Clairecords

In Solarium is a 2002 studio album by Estonian band Pia Fraus released on Clairecords. It is the sophomore album of the Estonian band, and features a re-recording of 'How Fast Can You Love' from their debut album. The album was reissued in 2016.

== Reception ==
Professional ratings
Review scores
Source	Rating
AllMusic	4/5 stars

Listing the album as one of the best shoegaze albums of all time, Far Out stated In Solarium "beautifully encapsulates a touch of the retro feel". Trouser Press considered the album "wonderful" and a maturation of the band's sound from previous albums "with no loss of energy". Brainwashed compared the band's music as "strikingly similar" to the work of My Bloody Valentine and Slowdive, finding the songs covered in a "mesmerizing fuzz" of distortion, although found the songs so similar that they were "slightly cumbersome to wade through". Comes with a Smile considered the songs "bittersweet and heartfelt", finding them nostalgically reminiscent of The Wedding Present, Slowdive, Lush and Superchunk, praising the songs as "three-minute rapid blasts of alternative-pop" filled with "incessantly dreamy melodies.

== Track listing ==
In Solarium track listing
No.	Title	Length
1.	"400&57"	3:56
2.	"Right Hand Traffic"	2:55
3.	"How Fast Can You Love"	3:14
4.	"Outskirts Of Me"	3:49
5.	"No Need For Sanity"	5:15
6.	"Octobergirl"	3:55
7.	"The End Of Time And Space Like We Used To Know It Is After You Have Finished Your Tea Approximately At 5:07 PM"	3:16
8.	"Bibabo"	2:11
9.	"On You"	4:09
10.	"Zodalovers"	3:51

== Personnel ==
- Rein Fuks – vocals, guitar, shaker, percussion
- Joosep Volk – drums, vocals
- Reijo Tagapere – bass
- Tõnis Kenkmaa – guitar
- Tanel Roovik – guitar
- Kärt Ojavee – organ, synthesizer, mastering
- Uku Toomet – mastering
