= Robert Scott Thompson =

American composer (born 1959)

Robert Scott Thompson (born 1959, California) is an American composer of ambient, instrumental and electroacoustic music. He earned the B.Mus. degree from the University of Oregon and M.A. and Ph.D. degrees from the University of California, San Diego. His primary teachers include Bernard Rands, Roger Reynolds, Joji Yuasa and F. Richard Moore. He creates work in a wide variety of forms ranging from chamber and orchestral music to works for the virtuoso soloist, computer music, and experimental video art.

He is the recipient of many prizes and distinctions for his music including the First Prize in Musica Nova 2003 (Czech Republic), First Prize in the 2001 Pierre Schaeffer competition (Italy) and awards in the XVI Concorso Internazionale “Luigi Russolo” (Italy), Irino Prize Foundation Competition 1995 for chamber Music (Japan), and Concours International de Musique Electroacoustique de Bourges (France), among others. He was a Research Assistant of the Center for Music Experiment (CME) Computer Audio Research Lab (CARL) throughout the 1980s, assisting significant composers in the realization of advanced computer music works.

In 1991, he was named a Fulbright Research Scholar and was Composer in Residence at the Danish Institute of Electroacoustic Music (DIEM) where he collaborated on fundamental research and composed the long-form computer music work – The Strong Eye. Over the past decade, he has become increasingly well known internationally for his instrumental and computer music works and also for his many recordings which have been broadcast worldwide.

His music is published on recordings by EMF-Media, Neuma, Drimala, Capstone, Hypnos, Oasis/Mirage, Groove, Lens Records, Space for Music, Zero Music and Aucourant record labels, among others.

While composing and recording takes up most of his creative time, he is also involved in various tangent activities. He is active as a composer for films and often collaborates as an audio mastering engineer, creating master recordings for labels such as Funtone and CRI (Composer's Recordings, Inc.). On the technical side, he has collaborated with Micro Technology Unlimited, and assisted in the development of DNOISE – a real-time digital audio noise reduction software application.

He is a contributing author for two books, Computer Music Techniques for the Electronic Musician and Software Synthesis, Sound Design and Programming, both by Dr. Eduardo Reck Miranda and published by Focal Press in 1998 and 2002 respectively. He is currently under contract for a book with A-R Editions, Inc. on the subject of musical signal processing and sonic design using Csound 5. He was named the Distinguished Honor’s Professor of Georgia State University, College of Arts and Sciences in 1994 where he is Professor of Music Composition and Coordinator of Music Technology Studies in the School of Music. In March 2021, Thompson released the double album Escapeology through American record label Somewherecold Records.
