= Common Children =

American alternative rock band

- Origin: Arkansas, US
- Genres: alternative rock
- Years active: 1995 – 2002
- Labels: Tattoo, Galaxy 21
- Spinoffs: Hammock
- Past members: Drew Powell (bass guitar); Marc Byrd (vocals, guitar); Hampton Taliaferro (percussion); Andrew Thompson (guitar)

Common Children was a Christian alternative rock band formed in Arkansas in 1995 by Marc Byrd, Drew Powell, and Hampton Taliaferro. The band recorded two studio albums, Skywire (1996) and Delicate Fade (1997), on Tattoo Records. Their song "Eyes of God" reached #5 on Christian music charts in 1998. With new bandmate and producer Andrew Thompson, Common Children released their final album, The Inbetween Time, in 2001. The album featured a more atmospheric sound compared to their previous albums. Common Children disbanded in 2002, and Thompson and Byrd went on to form the ambient music group Hammock.

== History ==
=== Formation ===
The group formed at a Christian college in Arkansas. Drew Powell and Marc Byrd attended the school and met Hampton Taliaferro through Byrd's roommate.

At Byrd's suggestion, Common Children chose their name because: "we are all common children in the sense that we all live together, in a broken world, in need of grace—beggars attempting to tell other beggars where to get bread." They have also stated that the name reflects the "mutual respect" and comradery they want to promote between them and their fans.

Common Children's performance at the 1995 Cornerstone Festival caught the attention of members of The Choir and producer Gene Eugene. Later that year they became one of the first artists to sign with the now-defunct Tattoo record label. They opened for The Choir on their Free Flying Soul tour the following year.

=== Skywire (1996) and Delicate Fade (1997) ===
In 1996, they released their studio debut, Skywire, the style of which has been referred to as melodic hard rock and grunge. On the song "Hate", Byrd screams: "I hate myself" in the chorus, leading to controversy among fans, some of whom chose to return their CDs. According to Byrd, the song was inspired by the Biblical book of Romans and written about struggling with the flesh. The song "Throw Me Over" addresses criticism that the band was not sufficiently Christian. The album was designated one of the Top 5 albums of 1996 by 7ball magazine.

On December 28, 1996, the band recorded their only live album, Setlist, in Jacksonville, Florida. The album had a very limited pressing and consisted of the entire Skywire album (excluding "Broken Smile") and two tracks from Delicate Fade. The CD was sold only at concerts and contained no over-dubs.

Compared to their debut, Delicate Fade (1997), had a lighter musical style which included strings. But it still featured some rock songs, like "Pulse". Produced by Steve Hindalong, the album's title references that "we are all in the process of dying". In addition to Christian themes like sin and the body of Christ, the album explores suffering, including ending relationships. One fan favorite was "Eyes of God" which reached #5 on Christian music charts in 1998. The song "Whisper" features the vocals of label mate Christine Glass who co-wrote the song with Byrd at their record label's suggestion. Glass and Byrd began dating and later married in 2001. To support the album, Common Children toured with Eric Champion, Everybodyduck, and Rich Young Ruler.

=== The Inbetween Time (2001) and break-up ===
In a 1998 interview, Common Children mentioned the possibility of a third album that fall. No album was released that year, and some fans thought that Common Children had disbanded. Eventually, they released their third and final album, The Inbetween Time, in 2001 on Galaxy21 Music. Andrew Thompson, who had joined the band on tour, co-produced the album with Byrd.

Stylistically, The Inbetween Time is a departure from Common Children's earlier music in that it features a more atmospheric shoegaze sound, with delayed guitars and ethereal vocals. Some reviewers wrote that it built on the style of Delicate Fade, particularly the song "Absence of Light" which they compared to "Stains of Time". The song "Free" references the music of Steve Hindalong and The Choir, and Byrd has said he was influenced by Hindalong's "flying imagery". The songs "Always on the Outside" and "So Mysterious" were dedicated to Byrd's wife, Christine Glass, who also contributed vocals to the album.

Byrd later called The Inbetween Time Common Children's best album. In interviews, Byrd has stated that Common Children broke up after The Inbetween Time and that he did not expect them to make another album together. After The Inbetween Time, Thompson and Byrd continued to explore atmospheric sounds through their ambient music project, Hammock. At least one reviewer has pointed to The Inbetween Time as a precursor to Hammock's sound.

== Discography ==
=== Albums ===
- 1996 - Skywire (Tattoo)
- 1997 - Delicate Fade (Tattoo)
- 2001 - The Inbetween Time (Galaxy 21 Music)

=== Live Albums ===
- 1996 - Setlist (Tattoo)

=== Music Videos ===
- "Drought", Skywire
- "Eyes of God", Delicate Fade
