= Human (Christine Glass album) =

Debut album by American singer Christine Glass

Studio album by Christine Glass
- Released: March 11, 1997
- Genre: Alternative rock; Christian rock
- Length: 51:49
- Label: Tattoo Records
- Producer: Tommy Greer

Christine Glass chronology
Human (1997)	Love and Poverty (1999)

Human is the debut studio album by American Christian singer-songwriter Christine Glass. It was released on March 11, 1997, by Tattoo Records, and spawned the single "Crazy All Around", which had an accompanying music video that year.

== Background and music ==
Glass was born in Louisiana and earned a degree in vocal performance from Louisiana Tech University. In 1993, she moved to Nashville, and found a job working as an art director for Word Records. While working in this role, she started writing songs and working on demos with Word Records. After signing a deal with Christian label Tattoo, Glass began work on Human. In a 1997 interview, Glass said that the title "Human" came after she looked at all the songs that had been written. She thought it was a fitting title since the songs were about the different aspects of a life of a human being, and her life in particular. She added that, "some songs are about doubts that I have, and fears that I have, and some are about hope and the joy I have in Christ." In this interview, Glass also said that people thought her sound was similar to Tori Amos and The Cranberries.

== Reception ==
Professional ratings
Review scores
Source	Rating
AllMusic	3/5 stars

Human received a positive response from critics upon release. Tom Demalon of AllMusic wrote that "the Louisiana native has a girlish, child-like voice and, despite the obvious spiritual aspects of Human, her message never becomes too heavy-handed, allowing the album to be easily judged on its musical merits." In his 2002 book Encyclopedia of Contemporary Christian music, Mark Allan Powell compared the album's sound to PJ Harvey and Suzanne Vega and said that "her whispery vocals are often spread over experimental stylings, unusual harmonies and unpredictable accompaniment." He further wrote that the lyrical themes "extol the virtues and lament the drawbacks of being a human being" and described the closing track "When Worlds Collide" as being "a profound statement of the constant struggle between flesh and spirit that defines humanity."

In a 2003 interview, Glass said the album wasn't a commercial success since "I was under the delusion that you could make a really alternative record and have it sell well in the Christian market." She added, "looking back, I think that was just a young girl's dream."

== Track listing ==
No.	Title	Length
1.	"Truth"	3:30
2.	"I Believe"	4:31
3.	"Waves"	5:47
4.	"Hold My Hand"	4:59
5.	"Crazy All Around"	4:30
6.	"You Want"	6:30
7.	"Stay With Me"	3:47
8.	"Come Back Down"	3:46
9.	"Time Doesn't Heal All Wounds"	2:39
10.	"When Worlds Collide"	6:44
