= Pia Fraus =

Estonian musical group

Pia Fraus is a dream pop and shoegaze band based in Tallinn, Estonia, formed in 1998. "Pia Fraus" is a Latin saying, meaning "pious fraud" or "small lie".

== Members ==
Current

- Kristel Eplik (vocals)
- Eve Komp (vocals, synth)
- Kärt Ojavee (synth)
- Rein Fuks (guitar, synth, percussion)
- Reijo Tagapere (bass)
- Joosep Volk (drums)

== Discography ==
Studio albums

- Wonder What It's Like (2001)
- In Solarium (2002)
- Nature Heart Software (2006)
- After Summer (2008)
- Field Ceremony (2017)
- Empty Parks (2020)
- Now You Know It Still Feels the Same (2021)
- Evening Colours (2023)
