= Tears Run Rings (band) =

American shoegaze band

- Origin: Los Angeles, California; San Francisco, California; Portland, Oregon
- Genres: Shoegazing; Dream pop
- Years active: 2006–present
- Labels: Clairecords, Somewherecold Records
- Members: Ed Mazzucco; Laura Watling; Dwayne Palasek; Matthew Bice; Tim Morris
- Website: Official website

Tears Run Rings is an American shoegaze band consisting of singer/bassist Laura Watling, singer/guitarist Matthew Bice, guitarist Ed Mazzucco, guitarist Tim Morris, and drummer Dwayne Palasek. They have released three albums.

== History ==
Ed Mazzucco, Laura Watling, Tim Morris, and Dwayne Palasek have been collaborating various incarnations since the mid-90s. In 2007 they released their first EP as Tears Run Rings called "A Question and an Answer". They later teamed up with Matthew Bice of Shelflife Records to produce a full-length album entitled Always, Sometimes, Seldom, Never, which was released on Florida's Clairecords in April 2008. The album was well-reviewed (4/5 stars) and drew strong comparisons to shoegaze bands of 20 years earlier: "may be a dead ringer for Slowdive, right down to their torrents of cascading, distorted, and delayed guitars and ubiquitous male-female cooing, with slight seasonings of Moose, Chapterhouse, and Kitchens of Distinction".

Their second album entitled Distance was released in 2010. A third album was released in 2016, entitled In Surges. In December 2016, American webzine Somewherecold ranked In Surges No. 8 on their Somewherecold Awards 2016 list. In 2018, Tears Run Rings contributed an exclusive song to the Somewherecold Records Various Artists compilation Resistance: In Support of the Southern Poverty Law Center.

== Discography ==
=== Albums ===
- Always, Sometimes, Seldom, Never (2008)
- Distance (2010)
- In Surges (2016)
- Everything in the End (2024)

=== EPs ===
- A Question and an Answer (2007)
- Somewhere (2018)

=== Singles ===
- "Lost Touch" (2024)
