= Anders Brørby =

- Born: April 10, 1984 (age 41); Jevnaker, Norway
- Genres: Electronic; drone; noise; experimental; ambient; progressive; synthpop
- Occupation(s): Composer, songwriter, singer
- Years active: 2010–present
- Labels: Gizeh Records, Hylé Tapes, Feral Delight, Land Animal Tapes, Fort Evil Fruit, Forwind, Katuku Collective, Somewherecold Records

Anders Brørby (born 1984) is a Norwegian composer and sound artist, based in Oslo. He was a founding member and songwriter in progressive / psychedelic band Radiant Frequency.

== Discography ==
=== Solo ===
==== Albums ====
- You Were There With Me (Feral Delight, 2014)
- Nocturnal Phases (Feral Delight, 2014)
- Holiday Affairs (Feral Delight, 2015)
- Phoenix Down (Fort Evil Fruit, 2016)
- Mulholland Drive, 1984 (Hylé Tapes, 2016)
- Nihil (Gizeh Records, 2016)
- Traumas (Forwind, 2018)
- Rock Bottom (Feral Delight, 2018)
- Kill Count (Somewherecold Records, 2019)

==== EPs ====
- Heartbreaking Lovemaking (Feral Delight, 2015)
- And All Became Death (Feral Delight, 2015)
- Heartbreaking Lovemaking II (Feral Delight, 2015)

=== Collaboration albums ===
- Heteroticisms Volume 3: Anders Brørby / Oomny Mozg (Land Animal Tapes, 2016)
- Mannen Faller (with Rune Clausen) (Feral Delight/Katuktu Collective, 2017)
- Trilogy I: Anders Brørby/The Corrupting Sea (Somewherecold Records, 2019)

=== With Radiant Frequency ===
- The Abandoned (Big Dipper, 2010)
- Brørby Sko (Feral Delight, 2015)
