= Somewherecold Records =

American record label

- Founded: 2004 (original); 2016 (relaunch)
- Founder: Jason T. Lamoreaux
- Status: Active
- Distributor: The Business
- Genre: ambient, shoegaze, dream pop, slowcore, post-rock, space rock, drone
- Country of origin: United States
- Location: Shelbyville, Kentucky
- Official website: www.somewherecold.net

Somewherecold Records (formerly Somewhere Cold Records) is an American independent record label established in late 2004 by Jason T. Lamoreaux. The record company was founded in Lexington, Kentucky, but is currently headquartered in Shelbyville, Kentucky. It releases ambient, shoegaze, dream pop, slowcore, post-rock, space rock and drone music, with an international roster of artists spanning from the early 2000s to the present. Somewherecold Records has released music on vinyl records, compact discs, compact cassettes and digital audio formats, with global distribution through The Business. The company is affiliated with the Somewherecold webzine, which was formed two years before the record label.

== History ==
=== As Somewhere Cold Records (2004–2006) ===
Prior to founding Somewhere Cold Records, Jason T. Lamoreaux was a university professor and a music journalist at the Somewhere Cold webzine (later renamed Somewherecold). The online music magazine had been founded on March 1, 2002, by Canadian journalist Brent Diaz, and became a source of information, with news, reviews and interviews, on the shoegaze, dream pop, post-rock and slowcore music scenes. Lamoreaux was at the time residing in Lexington, Kentucky and joined the blog in March 2003 during its one-year anniversary. After two years of interviewing bands and reviewing records, Lamoreaux ventured into the music releasing industry, appropriately naming his new company Somewhere Cold Records.

Somewhere Cold Records' first four releases were all co-financed by and co-released with Republic of Texas Recordings, a record label based in Houston, Texas operated by Lamoreaux's friend Travis Graham. Somewhere Cold Records launched with the release of Starflyer 59's 12-inch vinyl extended play The Last Laurel on March 9, 2005. The EP was released on a single-sided clear vinyl featuring the music on one side and a silk-screened design on the other; the silk-screened side came in four different limited and numbered variations: red, black, light blue or dark blue ink, and was packaged in a thick plastic sleeve. This was followed by Hammock's second release, the extended play Stranded Under Endless Sky, released on July 16, 2005, on select limited edition black and clear 12" vinyls. A compact disc version was released through the band's own record label, Hammock Music, ten days later.

In October 2005, Somewhere Cold Records released Joy Electric's full-length album The Ministry Of Archers on a choice of two limited edition colored 12" vinyl records: bright orange with mint green splatter or bright orange and mint green split. A CD version had been released through Tooth & Nail Records on August 30, 2005, but the vinyl edition came with two exclusive bonus tracks. After three successful vinyl releases, Somewhere Cold Records released its first compact disc in late November 2005: Herbert Grimauld, Jr's project The Sound Gallery's sophomore album Phos.

On June 23, 2006, Somewhere Cold Records opened the Somewhere Cold Mini-Shop, a webstore selling the record label's releases, with plans to additionally distribute releases from other shoegaze, dream pop and post-rock bands and record labels. The only non-Somewhere Cold Records release that ended up distributed through the webstore, however, was Living with Hermits' self-released Apropos CD EP, a release by Lamoreaux friend. Despite moderate success with Somewhere Cold Records, Lamoreaux decided to put the record label on an indefinite hiatus in late 2006, shortly after relocating to Fort Worth, Texas. The Somewhere Cold webzine continued successfully for the next two years but slowed down considerably in 2009, with a final post on September 23, 2009; by the summer of 2010 the domain was expired.

=== As Somewherecold Records (2016–present) ===
On September 15, 2016, after a ten-year hiatus from the record label, and a seven-year hiatus from the webzine, Lamoreaux decided to resume Somewhere Cold's operations. With Lamoreaux taking over full ownership, Somewhere Cold was officially renamed Somewherecold; both the webzine and the record label adopted the name change. A new company logo was designed by Paul Lewis and was unveiled in February 2017. Somewherecold Records was officially re-launched on March 28, 2017, with the release of The Beremy Jets' compilation EP Collection I. The limited edition release compiled two The Beremy Jets extended plays (Alchemy Attack EP and Backup Friend EP) on a single compact cassette, one EP per side, and was also made available digitally.

That same year, Somewherecold Records also released Yellow6's album 13 Loops on a limited edition cassette tape and digitally, Ummagma's EP LCD on a limited edition compact disc and digitally, and Mis+ress' self-titled debut album on a limited edition compact disc and digitally. The record label also published three releases by Lamoreaux's own project The Corrupting Sea: the albums Samatta and Symphony of a Radical, and the Resist EP, on an array of compact discs, cassette tapes and digital formats. Somewherecold Records finished off the year with Aidan Baker's full-length album Aberration, released on December 8, 2017, on a limited edition compact disc and compact cassette, as well as digitally.

In 2018, Lamoreaux moved from Fort Worth, Texas, to Louisville, Kentucky, relocating the record label back to its home state. On June 22, 2018, Somewherecold Records released Resistance: In Support of the Southern Poverty Law Center, a digital Various Artists compilation for the benefit of the Southern Poverty Law Center, featuring fourteen exclusive songs from such artists as Tears Run Rings, Pia Fraus, The Beremy Jets, Orange Crate Art, Beatastic and The Corrupting Sea. On July 27, 2018, The Beremy Jet's first full-length album Careless was released on a limited edition compact disc and digitally. The year also saw limited edition releases of Neiv's album Canyon Dreams on compact disc and digitally, Zombie Girlfriend's album Wind on compact disc and digitally, Thee Koukouvaya's album Το παρελθόν περιέχει το μέλλον on compact disc and digitally, and a reissue of Sciflyer's extended play The Age Of Lovely, Intimate Things on cassette tape and digital formats. 2018 also saw four releases by Lamoreaux's The Corrupting Sea project, including the digital-only Live On KOOP 91.7 in Austin, TX on Fade To Yellow With Tam Laird - Feb 8, 2018, Live At Three Links in Dallas TX- Moon Sounds Records Showcase 3/11/18 and I Love You Over the Moon EP, along with the full-length Reflections on cassette tape.

In 2019, Lamoreaux relocated again, this time to Shelbyville, Kentucky; a suburb town located halfway between Louisville and Frankfort. The year proved to be bountiful for Somewherecold Records, with a total of 25 new releases, through which Lamoreaux introduced several original limited edition series One of these, the Frostbite Series, releases CDs packaged in brown cardboard sleeves and placed inside squared coloured envelopes with stickers; they differ from the rest of Somewherecold Records' CD releases which are usually housed in digipak sleeves. Another, the Icebox Series, releases Mini-CDs (8 cm discs) packaged in black cardboard boxes with bonus record label merchandise, like stickers, pins and collectible toys. The last, the Avalanche Series, is used to release multi-CD releases (normally 3xCD releases), packaged in special brown cardboard sleeves with a simple single-sided printed insert.

Somewherecold Records' highlight releases of 2019 include Tombstones in Their Eyes' album Maybe Someday, which was released on 12" vinyl and compact disc; Blue Unit's self-titled debut EP, which was announced as the label's final cassette tape release (though this was retracted in 2020); Droneroom's sophomore release I'll Make it Up to You, I Swear...; Outward's album That's Life; Anders Brørby's album Kill Count and split with The Corrupting Sea Trilogy I; The Warm Jets' debut full-length Here We Come; Blanket Swimming's album Perpetual Seeds for Fleeting Time; and two A Journey of Giraffes full-lengths: Hour Club and Kona.

2020 was another prolific year for Somewherecold Records with a total of 45 new releases. On March 4, 2020, Somewherecold Records announced a global distribution deal had been signed with American company The Business. On July 3, 2020, the record label released Resistance Compilation II: In Support of the ACLU, a digital Various Artists compilation for the benefit of the American Civil Liberties Union, featuring thirty-four exclusive songs from such artists as Anders Brørby, Aidan Baker, Tape Deck Mountain, Robert Scott Thompson, Yellow6 and The Corrupting Sea. Some of the year's other highlight releases include The Microdance's album Our Love Noire; Tombstones in their Eyes' two compilation albums Collection and Demos, Vol. 1; Vision Eternel's EP For Farewell of Nostalgia; Tristan Welch's album Ambient Distress; Wolfredt's album Tides; Backwards Charm's album Nevergreen; Giacomelli's album Cosmic Order; and Droneroom's compilation album Blood On Blood.

== Artists ==
This is a partial list of artists who record for Somewherecold Records.

- Aidan Baker
- Anders Brørby
- The Beremy Jets
- The Corrupting Sea
- Droneroom
- Hammock
- Joy Electric
- My Education
- David Newlyn
- North End
- Pia Fraus
- Starflyer 59
- Tape Deck Mountain
- Tears Run Rings
- Thisquietarmy
- Tombstones in their Eyes
- Robert Scott Thompson
- Ummagma
- Vision Eternel
- Margus Voolpriit
- Wolfredt
- Yellow6

== See also ==
- List of record labels
