= Hammock Music =

Label imprint owned and operated by the band Hammock

- Founded: 2005
- Founder: Marc Byrd, Andrew Thompson
- Distributor: Redeye Worldwide (Worldwide)
- Genre: Ambient, post-rock, shoegaze
- Country of origin: United States
- Location: Nashville, TN
- Official website: www.hammockmusic.com/label/

Hammock Music, based in Nashville, Tennessee, is the label imprint owned and operated by the band Hammock. The label is distributed by Secretly Distribution. In 2015, Hammock Music signed Slow Meadow, an ambient music project by Matt Kidd, to their label imprint. Hammock Music released Slow Meadow's self-titled debut in August 2015.

== Label artists ==
- Hammock
- Slow Meadow
- The Summer Kills
- Amman / Josh
- The Ascent of Everest

== Imprint releases ==
- Kenotic (2005, HMK-001CD)
- Stranded Under Endless Sky EP (2005, HMK-002CD)
- The Sleep-Over Series (Volume 1) (2006, HMK-003CD)
- Raising Your Voice...Trying to Stop an Echo (2006, HMK-004CD)
- Maybe They Will Sing for Us Tomorrow (2008, HMK-005CD)
- Chasing After Shadows... Living with the Ghosts (2010, HMK-006CD)
- Chasing After Shadows... Living With the Ghosts (Outtakes) EP (2010, digital)
- North West East South EP (2010, limited)
- Longest Year EP (2011, HMK-007CD)
- Asleep in the Downlights EP (2012, HMK-008CD)
- Departure Songs (2012, HMK-009CD)
- Oblivion Hymns (2013, HMK-011CD)
- The Sleepover Series, Volume Two (2014, HMK-012CD)
- Slow Meadow, Slow Meadow (2016, HMK-013CD)
- Everything and Nothing (2016, HMK-014CD)
- Mysterium (2017, HMK-015)
- Slow Meadow, Costero (2017, HMK-016)
- Columbus (2017)
- Amman / Josh, Places (2018, HMK-019)
- The Ascent of Everest, Is Not Defeated (2019, HMK-023)
- Universalis (2019, HMK-024)

== See also ==
- List of record labels
