= Hammock (band) =

American ambient/post-rock band

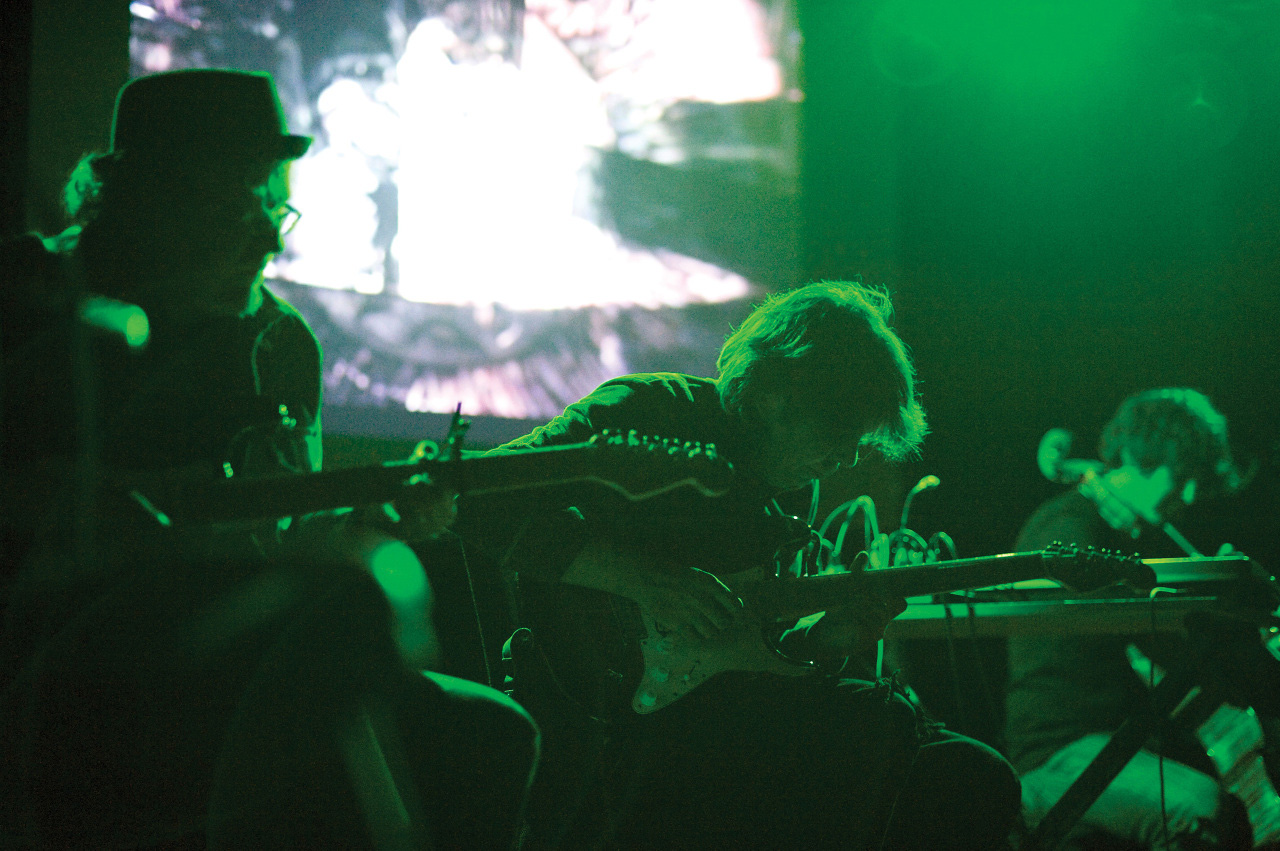
- Hammock performing in 2008

Background information
- Origin: Nashville, Tennessee, United States
- Genres: Ambient; post-rock; shoegaze
- Years active: 2005–present
- Labels: Hammock Music; Darla; Somewherecold
- Members: Marc Byrd; Andrew Thompson
- Website: hammockmusic.com

Hammock is an American ambient post-rock band formed in Nashville, Tennessee, in 2003. The group consists of guitarists Marc Byrd and Andrew Thompson, both former members of the alternative rock band Common Children. Renowned for their atmospheric "soundscapes that blend elements of shoegaze, electronic music, and neoclassical, they have emerged as a significant act in modern instrumental music.

The duo debuted in 2005 with the critically acclaimed album Kenotic, which established their signature expansive sound. They gained wider recognition in 2006 when several of their songs were featured during NBC's coverage of the 2006 Winter Olympics. Over a career spanning more than two decades, the band has released over 14 studio albums, including the double-LP Departure Songs (2012) and a trilogy of albums exploring themes of grief and transcendence. Their work has been frequently licensed for film, television, and major advertising campaigns, while earning praise from outlets such as Pitchfork, AllMusic, and the BBC.

Hammock primarily releases music through their own independent label, Hammock Music, using Secretly Distribution. This affords them the ability to maintain creative control over their evolving sonic direction. They have collaborated with diverse artists including Jónsi and Alex Somers, and only performed live several times during their early period.

== History ==
=== Formation and first releases ===
Hammock was formed in Nashville, Tennessee, by Byrd and Thompson, both former members of the alternative rock band Common Children. After that band split in 2001, Byrd and Thompson continued to write, record, and produce together in their free time. Byrd was a songwriter for EMI Records, a job which he disliked and left him feeling burned out creatively. At Thompson's basement studio, Studio 37, in his home, they started experimenting with ambient music that they had wanted to produce. The style of music was similar to the music the pair were listening to for pleasure, and "so far removed" from what they were used to working on which provided a refreshing and new direction. Byrd said: "We didn't really see it turning into anything other than just good musical therapy." Before long the pair had recorded between 20 and 40 tracks from these informal sessions which prompted them to release the material, thinking others might enjoy the music. The band acquired its name when Byrd was hosting a party at his house, and told his friends that he and Thompson were stuck for names. A friend noticed his hammock in the garden and suggested it, which stuck. Byrd said: I didn't think of hammock, like the lazy beach. I thought of it more like, looking at the stars."

In March 2005, music written and recorded from these initial sessions over a two-and-a-half year period was released on Hammock's debut album, Kenotic. The record was written and recorded intermittently across a two-and-a-half year period, and self-released by the band. The enthusiastic response to the album took them by surprise. This was followed by the EP Stranded Under Endless Sky four months later. The band published their website with quotes, poems, and external links to content that they thought fit with their music. At the end of 2005, the webzine Somewhere Cold voted Hammock Artist of the Year on their 2005 Somewhere Cold Awards Hall of Fame list.

Hammock's debut live performance was at Chuck Dodson's Gallery@404B in Hot Springs, Arkansas, on August 3, 2007, at the after-party of an event to honor the Icelandic artistic duo Jónsi & Alex. The band wrote all new music purposely for the gig, and used loop pedals so the two could perform alone. The material was the basis of their third studio album Maybe They Will Sing for Us Tomorrow, named after a piece of art by Jónsi & Alex who agreed to produce the cover art for it. The album was recorded live in its entirety, save for a few overdubs. In 2008, Hammock performed at the Wordless Music Series in New York City with fellow ambient duo Stars of the Lid.

=== 2010–2016 ===
In May 2010, Hammock released their fourth album Chasing After Shadows...Living with the Ghosts. The group wanted a change in musical direction as they developed a new fanbase with the previous album, so they incorporated orchestral arrangements and fuller instrumentation on their new material. Hammock said the change was "a natural progression ... that's the voice you have to follow". They amassed 50 potential tracks for the record, using what fit its overall mood the best. That December, Hammock released their fourth EP, Longest Year, a beatless and wordless mini-album that was born out of the difficulty the band faced in 2010, including the near-total destruction of Byrd's home in the 2010 Tennessee floods. By the end of that year, Hammock had performed just twice in Nashville.

Over the next few years, Hammock expanded their musical horizons with a variety of collaborations and the addition of more of an orchestral aspect to their music. Hammock collaborated with singer-songwriter Matthew Ryan on the single "Like New Year's Day", released on January 1, 2011. On March 8, 2011, the band issued a cover of Catherine Wheel's "Black Metallic" as a digital single, featuring vocals by Byrd's wife, Christine Glass (the couple had previously collaborated as a duo, GlassByrd). On October 5, 2011, they released a four-song collaboration EP with Steve Kilbey and Tim Powles of the Church called Asleep in the Downlights.

On July 6, 2012, Hammock announced that mastering had started for their sixth LP and first double album, Departure Songs. It was released on October 2, 2012.

On May 10, 2013, they announced that they had begun mixing a new record, Oblivion Hymns. The album was released on November 26, 2013, and was a notable departure from their previously guitar-focused sound, adding a neoclassical element with a full orchestra, children's choir, and vocals from Timothy Showalter (Strand of Oaks).

On July 1, 2014, Hammock reissued their fully ambient 2005 album The Sleep-Over Series (Volume 1), following it up with a sequel, The Sleepover Series, Volume 2, on September 23, 2014.

Hammock's ninth album, Everything and Nothing, was released on April 1, 2016. Irish music and politics magazine Hot Press said in its review that the album is "the aural equivalent of a flotation tank... an album to lose yourself in completely". Haydon Spenceley, reviewing for Drowned in Sound, stated that the album has "clarity, purpose, drivenness, even, not words that would necessarily be associated with this stellar band's earlier work... This is music of transcendent beauty, but with an added level of dissonance that grabs the attention in a way that hasn't ever seemed to be Hammock's stock in trade before". Spenceley also claimed that Everything and Nothing is Hammock's "most immediate, most sonorous and beautiful album to date".

=== 2017–present ===
On June 21, 2017, Hammock announced via their Facebook page that their 10th album, Mysterium, would be released on August 25, 2017. They also released a video of the first single, "Things of Beauty Burn". In 2018, Hammock released the follow-up to 2017's Mysterium with the album, Universalis. In 2019, Hammock released the follow-up to 2019's Universalis with the album, Silencia, thus concluding their self-proclaimed trilogy

In 2017, Hammock composed the score for Kogonada's critically acclaimed film Columbus, which premiered at the 2017 Sundance Film Festival.

In 2018, Hammock released an album, We Will Rise Again, that "reimagined" work composed by Dan Romer for the 2017 videogame Far Cry 5.

In 2020, Hammock released a remaster of their 2010 EP, Longest Year, with a physical release as well as new album artwork.

In 2024, Hammock released the album A Hopeful Sign in collaboration with American rock band Yellowcard: a collection of nine pre-existing Yellowcard songs re-interpreted with new instrumentation by Hammock.

== Other projects ==
Since 2005, Byrd has occasionally recorded as a member of the band the Choir.

Hammock guested on the track "Melting the Frozen Sea Within Us" by Amman/Josh, which appeared on that band's 2010 EP, Places.

Hammock collaborated with Matthew Perryman Jones in 2013 on the song "Unknown", released as part of the Nashville Indie Spotlight 2014 compilation album.

Building on their 2011 collaboration with Matthew Ryan, Hammock announced a side project named the Summer Kills in March 2018. After seven years of work, the trio's first album, Last Night We Became Swans (mixed by Peter Katis) was released on April 27, 2018.

== Discography ==
=== Studio albums ===
- Kenotic (2005, Hammock Music; reissued digitally 2015 with session outtakes)
- Raising Your Voice... Trying to Stop an Echo (2006, Darla Records; reissued 2011, Hammock Music)
- Maybe They Will Sing for Us Tomorrow (2008, Darla Records; reissued 2013, Hammock Music)
- Chasing After Shadows... Living with the Ghosts (2010, Hammock Music; reissued 2013 as a 2-CD set with session outtakes)
- Departure Songs (2012, Hammock Music)
- Oblivion Hymns (2013, Hammock Music)
- Everything and Nothing (2016, Hammock Music)
- Mysterium (2017, Hammock Music)
- Universalis (2018, Hammock Music)
- Silencia (2019, Hammock Music)
- Elsewhere (2021, Hammock Music)
- Love in the Void (2023, Hammock Music)
- From the Void (2024, Hammock Music)
- Nevertheless (2025, Hammock Music)
- The Second Coming Was a Moonrise (May 2026, Hammock Music)
- A Moonrise Was the Second Coming (December 2026, Hammock Music)

=== EPs ===
- Stranded Under Endless Sky (2005, Hammock Music/Republic of Texas Recordings/Somewherecold Records)
- North West East South (2010, Hammock Music)
- Chasing After Shadows... Living With the Ghosts (Outtakes) (2010, Hammock Music)
- Longest Year (2010, Hammock Music)
- Asleep in the Downlights (2011, Hammock Music)
- Repeat / Texture (2018, Hammock Music)

=== Singles ===
- "Geminis in the Country" (previously unreleased)
- "Black Metallic" feat. Christine Glass (Catherine Wheel cover) (2005; reissued 2011, Hammock Music)
- "Sora" (2006, self-released)
- "Harmonica" (2006, self-released)
- "My Shoulder Covered With Stars" (2009, self-released)
- "Like New Year's Day" with Matthew Ryan (2011, Hammock Music)
- "The More You Drink From the Well... The Higher the Waters Will Rise" (2012, self-released)
- "From the Dust... We Ran to Greet the Dawn" (2013, Hammock Music)
- "Baritone Recovery" (2014, Hammock Music)
- "Sleepover 1 • Sleepover.FM" (2014, self-released)
- "Blood Moon 04.15.14" (2014, self-released)
- "Blood Moon 10.08.14" (2014, self-released)
- "Blood Moon 04.04.15" (2015, self-released)
- "Blood Moon 09.28.15" (2015, self-released)
- "The Night You Caught Fire / Clinging" (2018, self-released)
- "Floating World / Snowburn" (2018, self-released)
- "Blood Moon 01.20.19" (2019, self-released)
- "Into the Blank / Madi" (2020, self-released)
- "Spinning Through Us" (2020, self-released)
- "I'm a Sensory Explosion" feat. Lumenette (2022, self-released)
- "Blood Moon 03.03.26" (2026, self-released)

=== Remixes ===
- Helios - "The Obeisant Vine (Hammock remix)" (2012)
- Rhian Sheehan - "Borrowing the Past (Hammock remix)" (2012)
- "Gemini and the Black Knight (timEbandit remix)" (2013)

=== Collections ===
- The Sleepover Series (Volume 1) (2005, Hammock Music; reissued 2014)
- The Sleepover Series (Volume 2) (2014, Hammock Music)
- Undercurrents (2019, self-released)

=== Compilation albums ===
- EPs, Singles and Remixes (2013)
- An Introduction to Hammock (2013)
- An Introduction to Hammock (Volume 2) (2015)
- Blood Moon (2026)

=== Collaborative albums ===
- A Hopeful Sign (with Yellowcard) (2024, Equal Vision Records)

=== Soundtracks ===
- Columbus (Original Motion Picture Soundtrack) (2017, Hammock Music)
- Far Cry 5 Presents: We Will Rise Again (Original Game Soundtrack) (2018, Ubisoft Music)

=== Selected compilation appearances ===
- "Black Metallic" on Never Lose That Feeling (Volume 2) (2006, Club AC30)
- "Sora" on For Nihon (2011, Unseen Records)
- "The More You Drink From the Well... The Higher the Waters Will Rise" on ...And Darkness Came (2012, Headphone Commute)
- "In the Shape of Longing" on Disquiet (Volume 1) (2017, Unseen Music)
- "Displacement" on For Ukraine (Volume 1) (2022, Headphone Commute)
- "Daka" on For LA (Volume 1) (2025, Nettwerk Music Group)
- "On the Tips of a Thousand Grasses" on Across the Horizon (Volume 2) (2026, Northern Spy Records)

=== Music videos ===
- "Mono No Aware" (2008)
- "Breathturn" (2010)
- "Longest Year" (2010)
- "Dark Beyond the Blue" (2010)
- "One Another" (2012)
- "Tape Recorder" (2012)
- "Cold Front" (2012)
- "Tornado Warning" (2012)
- "Mute Angels" (2012)
- "In the Middle of This Nowhere" (2013)
- "I Could Hear the Water at the Edge of All Things" (2013)
- "Sinking Inside Yourself" (2014)
- "Blankets of Night" (2015)
- "Things of Beauty Burn" (2017)
- "Circular As Our Way" (2019)
- "Afraid to Forget" (2019)
- "I Can Almost See You" (2021)
- "Procession / Love in the Void" (2022)
- "Release" (2023)
- "Gods Becoming Memories" (2024)

== See also ==
- List of ambient music artists
- List of dream pop artists
- List of post-rock bands
