= Marc Byrd =

American musician, writer, and producer

- Born: Carey Marcus Byrd; 1969 or 1970 (age 56–57)
- Origin: El Dorado, Arkansas
- Genres: Ambient, alternative rock, post-rock
- Occupations: Musician, Songwriter, Producer
- Instruments: Guitar, piano
- Years active: 1995–present
- Labels: Hammock Music, Darla
- Spouse: Christine Glass (m. 2001)
- Website: hammockmusic.com

Carey Marcus "Marc" Byrd (born 1970) is an American musician, writer, and producer best known as one-half of the post-rock/ambient duo Hammock with Andrew Thompson.

Since its formation in 2005, Hammock has released ten full-length albums and five EPs. One review of Hammock's 2013 record Oblivion Hymns remarked that Hammock "...has gone on to become one of the foremost purveyors of affecting ambient post-rock on the scene." Byrd was also involved in the 2006 ambient art project The Sleepover Series, Volume One, which featured five solo tracks written and performed by Byrd.

After an impromptu invitation to give their first-ever live performance as Hammock at the overseas debut art exhibition of Riceboy Sleeps, the artistic collaboration between Jón Þór (Jónsi) Birgisson (lead singer and guitarist of Sigur Rós) and Alex Somers (graphic designer and member of the band Parachutes), Byrd and Thompson wrote brand-new songs to celebrate the occasion, an undertaking which evolved into their album, Maybe They Will Sing for Us Tomorrow (Darla Records).

In December 2010, Hammock released their fourth EP titled Longest Year, a "mini-album" that was born out of the difficulty the band faced in 2010, including the near-total destruction of Byrd's home in the 2010 Tennessee floods.

As a member of Hammock, Byrd has collaborated with singer/songwriters such as Matthew Ryan and Matthew Perryman Jones.

Prior to the formation of Hammock, Byrd fronted the alternative rock band Common Children, as well as the band GlassByrd with his wife Christine Glass. Byrd has worked with The Choir, producing their album O How the Mighty Have Fallen. Byrd co-wrote the worship song "God of Wonders".
